= Mini Hatch =

Supermini car

Mini
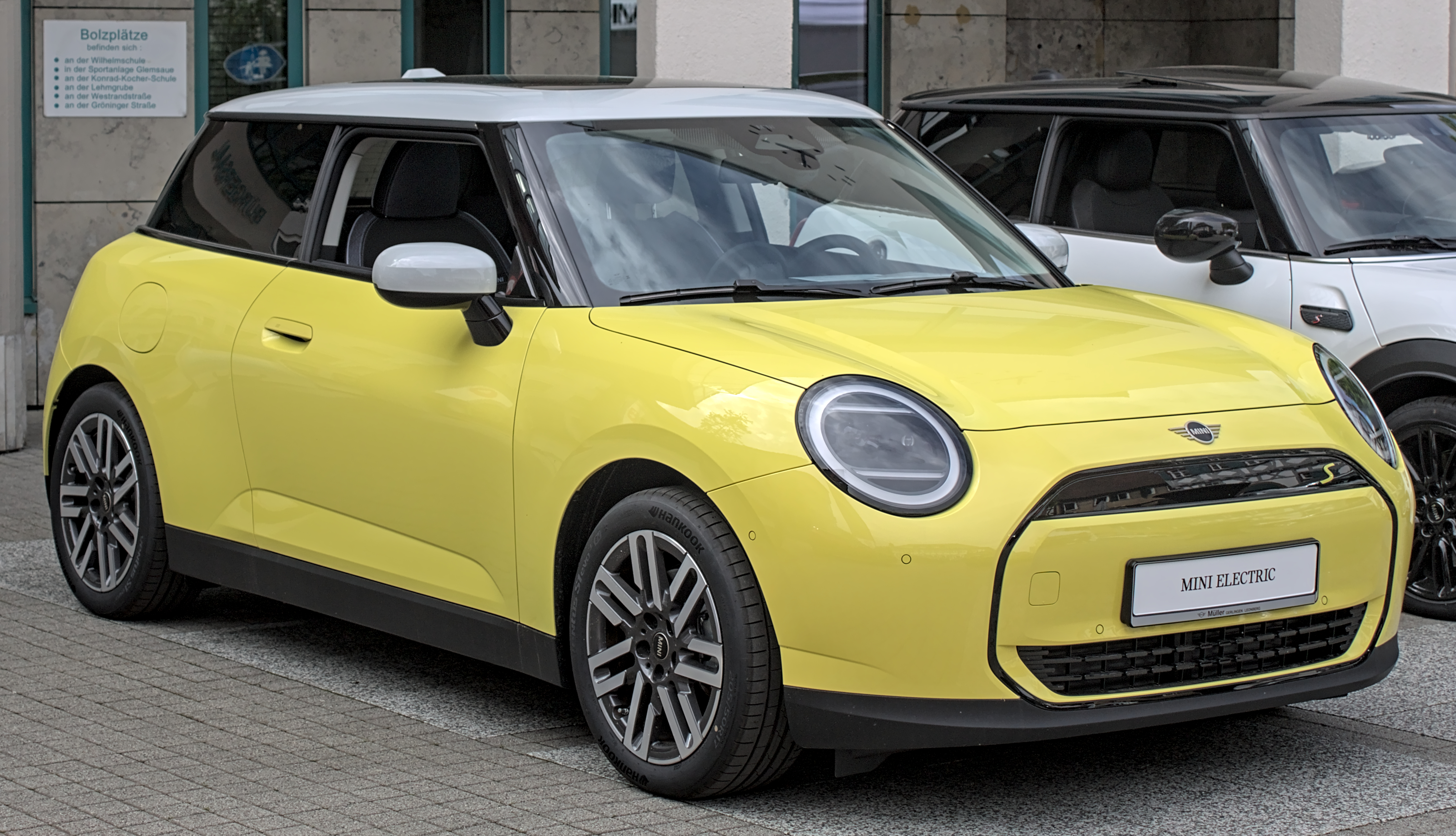
- 2024 Mini Cooper SE (J01)

Overview
- Manufacturer: Mini (BMW)
- Also called: Mini Cooper (2001–present); Mini John Cooper Works (2008–2024); Mini Hatch (2001–2024); Mini Hardtop (2001–2024); Mini One (2001–2022)
- Production: 2001–present
- Model years: 2002–present (North America)

Body and chassis
- Class: Supermini (B); Sport compact / hot hatch (Cooper S & JCW)
- Layout: Front-engine, front-wheel-drive

Chronology
- Predecessor: Mini; Austin Metro

The Mini (stylised all-uppercase as MINI) is a supermini car which has been made since April 2001. Colloquially known as the New Mini, all four generations have been produced as three-door hatchbacks and two-door convertibles, with a five-door (Note: Marketed as the "4-door" version in North America) hatchback body style added from the third generation. Introduced following the acquisition of the Mini marque by German carmaker BMW, it is a family of retro-styled cars with a front-engine, front-wheel-drive layout. The range has been marketed under various names, such as the Mini Cooper, Mini Hatch, Mini Hardtop, Mini One, and Mini John Cooper Works.

The Rover Group (which was then owned by BMW) first unveiled the Mini hatch concept car at the 1997 Frankfurt International Motor Show. Developed as a successor to the original Mini, the styling of the concept car was well received by the public and further developed. BMW sold the other parts of the Rover Group in May 2000, but retained the rights to Mini, although MG Rover were allowed to continue production of the original until October of that year. The new Mini entered production on 26 April 2001 and went on sale in July of that year, initially only as a three-door hatchback, in contrast to the original Mini which is predominantly a two-door saloon car.

The first-generation model was facelifted in 2004, coinciding with the introduction of the convertible variant. The second generation hatchback was launched in 2006, with the first-generation convertible replaced in 2008. The third generation entered production in 2013 and went on sale in 2014. With the launch of the fourth generation in 2024, the Mini Hatch has been renamed to Mini Cooper. BMW also developed several battery electric versions of the Mini, starting with the Mini E in 2009 developed only for field trials, followed by the mass-produced Mini Electric in 2019, and succeeded by the Mini Cooper E/SE in 2023 which uses a dedicated electric vehicle platform.

Mini models under BMW ownership are produced in Cowley, Oxfordshire, United Kingdom at Plant Oxford. Between July 2014 and February 2024, F56 3-door production was shared with VDL Nedcar in Born, Netherlands. The F57 convertible was exclusively assembled at the Born plant between 2015 and 2024. From 2024, all F65/66/67 combustion engined Mini hatch and convertible production will be centred at Oxford. Since late 2023, the electric Mini Cooper is developed and produced in China at the Spotlight Automotive joint venture facility in Zhangjiagang, Jiangsu. Since BMW's relaunch of the Mini brand, the marque's line-up has added larger models such as the Clubman in 2007, the Countryman in 2010, the Paceman in 2012, and the Aceman in 2024.

== Initial development ==
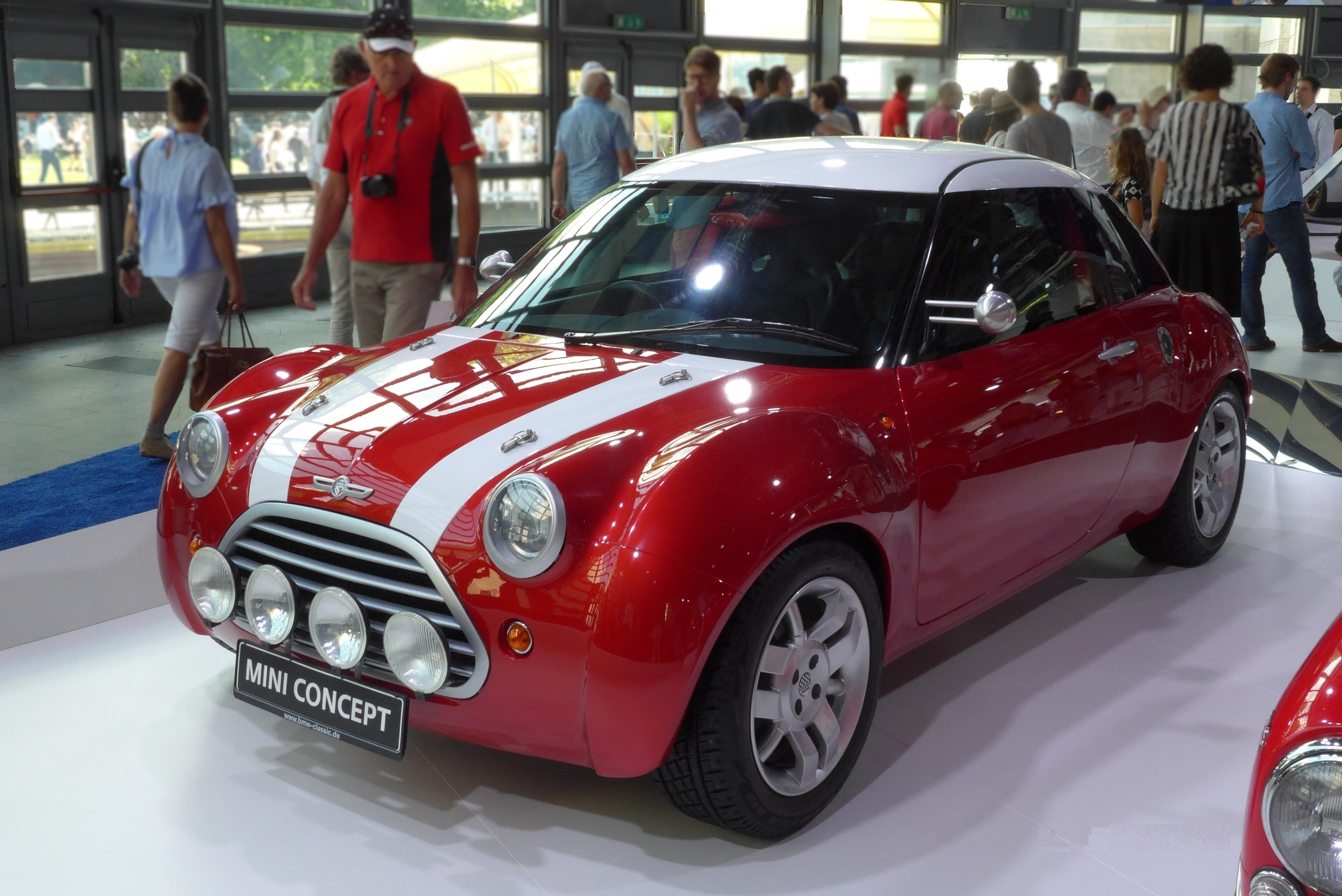
1997 Mini concept (ACV30)

The Mini Hatch (US: Hardtop) was designed by Frank Stephenson, and drew inspiration from the original two-door Mini. Development of the car was conducted between 1995 and 2001 by Rover Group in Gaydon, United Kingdom and BMW in Munich, Germany. During this development phase, there was continual contention between the two design groups, especially concerning the positioning of the car; Rover wanted a straight economy car (which would also replace the Rover 100 Series, which had evolved from the Metro in a 1994 restyle), whilst BMW supported a small, sporting car. Plans for an all-new supermini to replace the Metro in the mid-1990s were shelved when Rover was sold to BMW in January 1994, with the existing Metro model gaining a restyle and a new designation.

The concept was originally unveiled at the 1997 Frankfurt Motor Show at a joint BMW/Rover press conference, with details of the Chrysler/BMW joint venture Tritec engine, and proposed trim levels including Mini Minor (not used) and the Cooper/Cooper S.

Ultimately, BMW prevailed, and in 1999, they assumed control over the entire project following the departure of BMW's CEO, Bernd Pischetsrieder. When BMW sold off Rover in 2000, it retained the Mini project, and moved the planned production site of the car from Rover's Longbridge plant, to BMW's Oxford plant in Cowley, Oxford, England. The team of designers working on the 2001 Mini had finished the full-sized clay mock-up of the Mini in plenty of time for a presentation to the board of directors. However, the American chief designer, Frank Stephenson, realised that the model did not have an exhaust pipe. His short-term solution was to pick up an empty beer can, punch a hole in it, strip off the paint and push it into the clay at the back of the car, which took just a few minutes. The overall design for the mock-up was so good that the board members told him not to change a thing, resulting in the distinctive exhaust tip seen in production cars.

== First generation (R50/52/53; 2001) ==
First generation
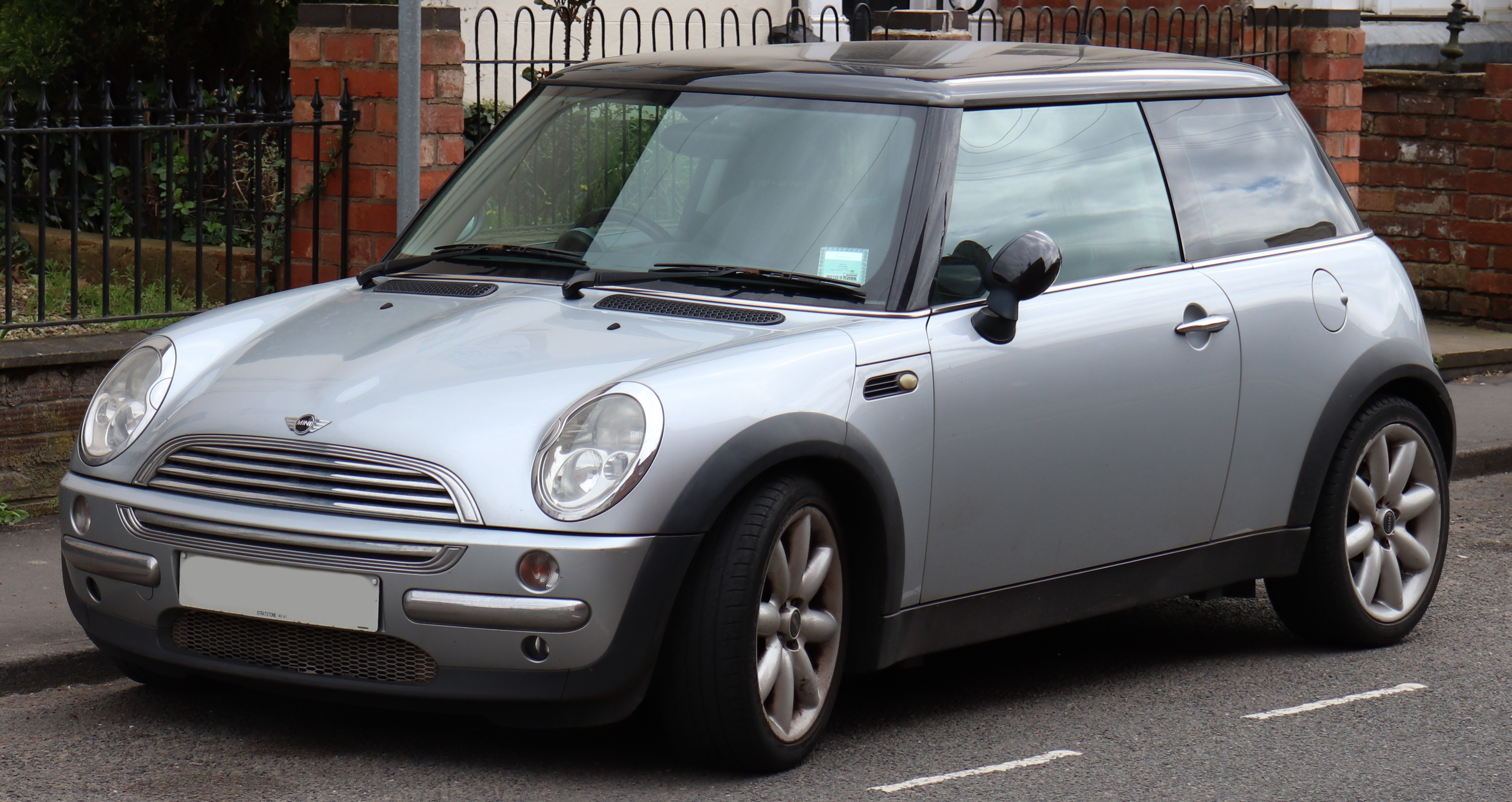
- Pre-facelift (2001–2004)

Overview
- Model code: R50/53 (Hatch); R52 (Convertible)
- Production: April 2001 – August 2006 (R50/53); 2004–2008 (R52)
- Assembly: United Kingdom: Cowley, Oxfordshire (Plant Oxford)
- Designer: Frank Stephenson

Body and chassis
- Body style: 3-door hatchback 2-door convertible

Powertrain
- Engine: Petrol: 1.4 L Chrysler Tritec I4 (One; Portugal and Greece); 1.6 L Chrysler Tritec I4 (One, Cooper); 1.6 L Chrysler Tritec supercharged I4 (Cooper S); Diesel: 1.4 L Toyota 1ND-TV I4 Common rail (D)
- Transmission: CVT; 5/6-speed manual 6-speed Steptronic automatic

Dimensions
- Wheelbase: 2,466 mm (97.1 in)
- Length: 2000–04 Base: 3,627 mm (142.8 in); 2005–06 Base: 3,635 mm (143.1 in); Cooper S: 3,655 mm (143.9 in)
- Width: 1,689 mm (66.5 in)
- Height: 2001–04 Base: 1,420 mm (55.9 in); 2001–04 S: 1,427 mm (56.2 in); 2005–06 Base: 1,407 mm (55.4 in); 2005–06 Cooper S: 1,417 mm (55.8 in); Convertible: 1,410 mm (55.5 in)
- Kerb weight: 1,050 kg (2,315 lb) (Cooper); 1,175 kg (2,591 lb) (Cooper Convertible); 1,215 kg (2,678 lb) (Cooper S); 1,240 kg (2,734 lb) (Cooper S Convertible)

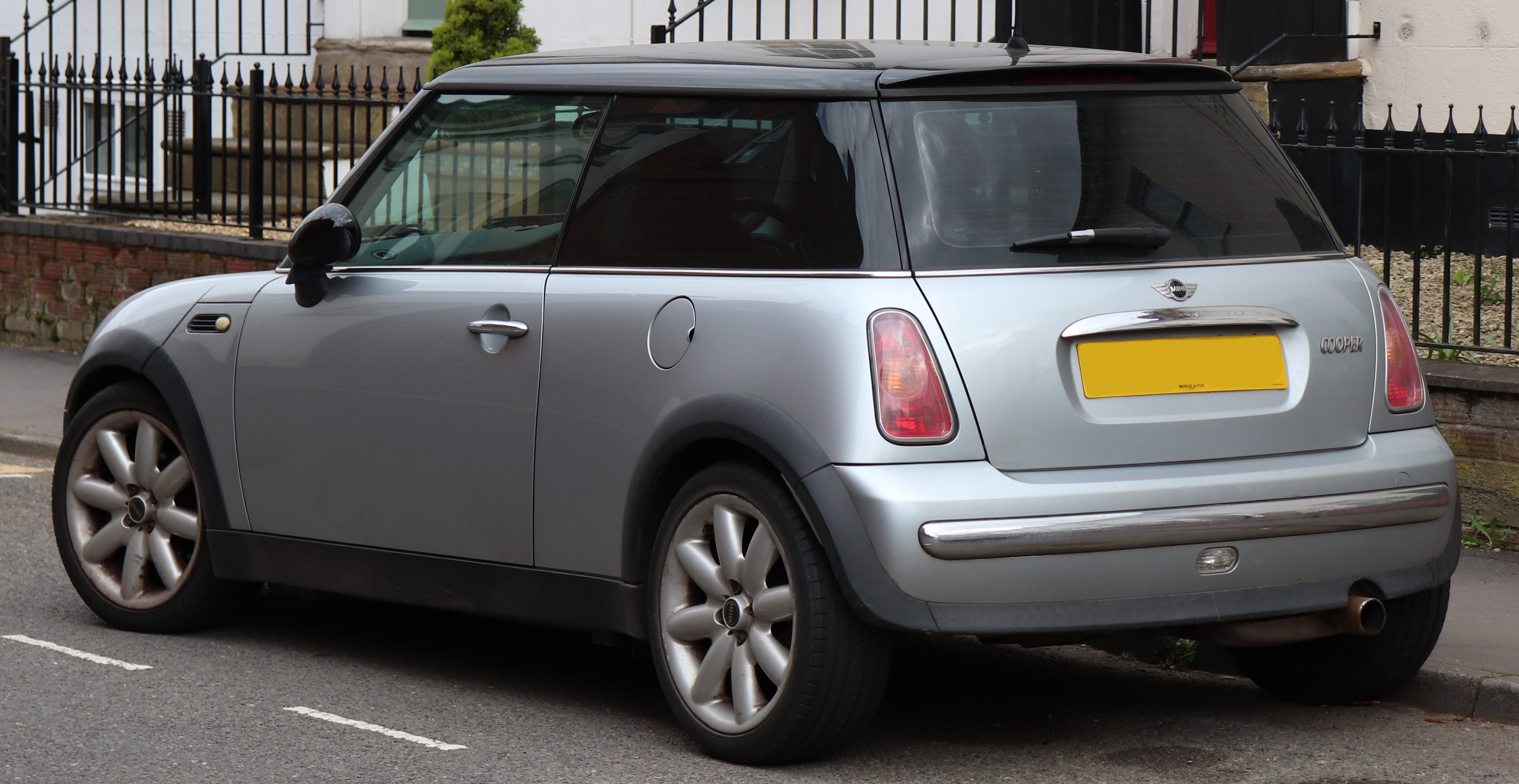
Pre-facelift Hatch (2001–2004)

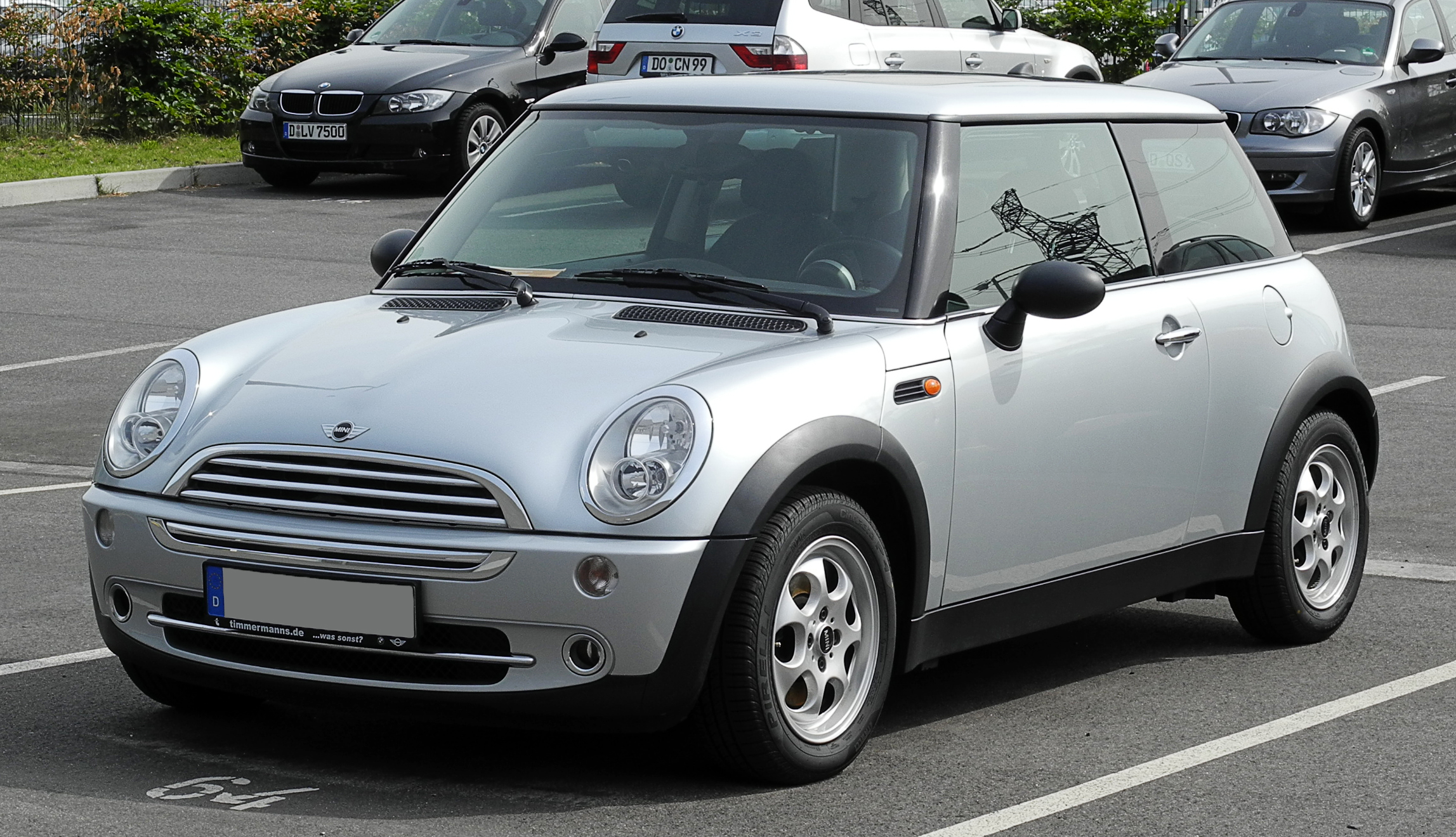

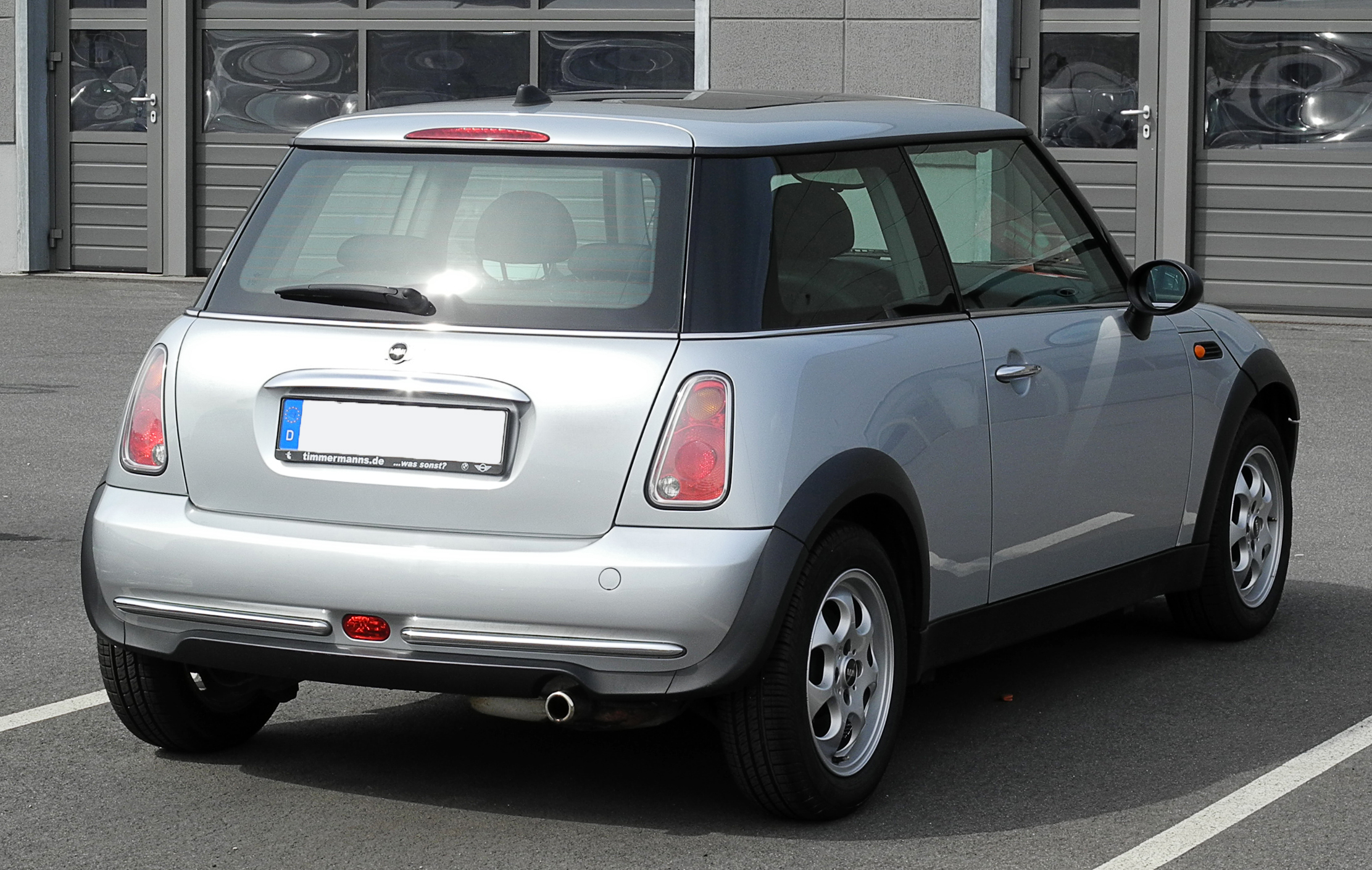
Facelift Hatch (2005–2006)

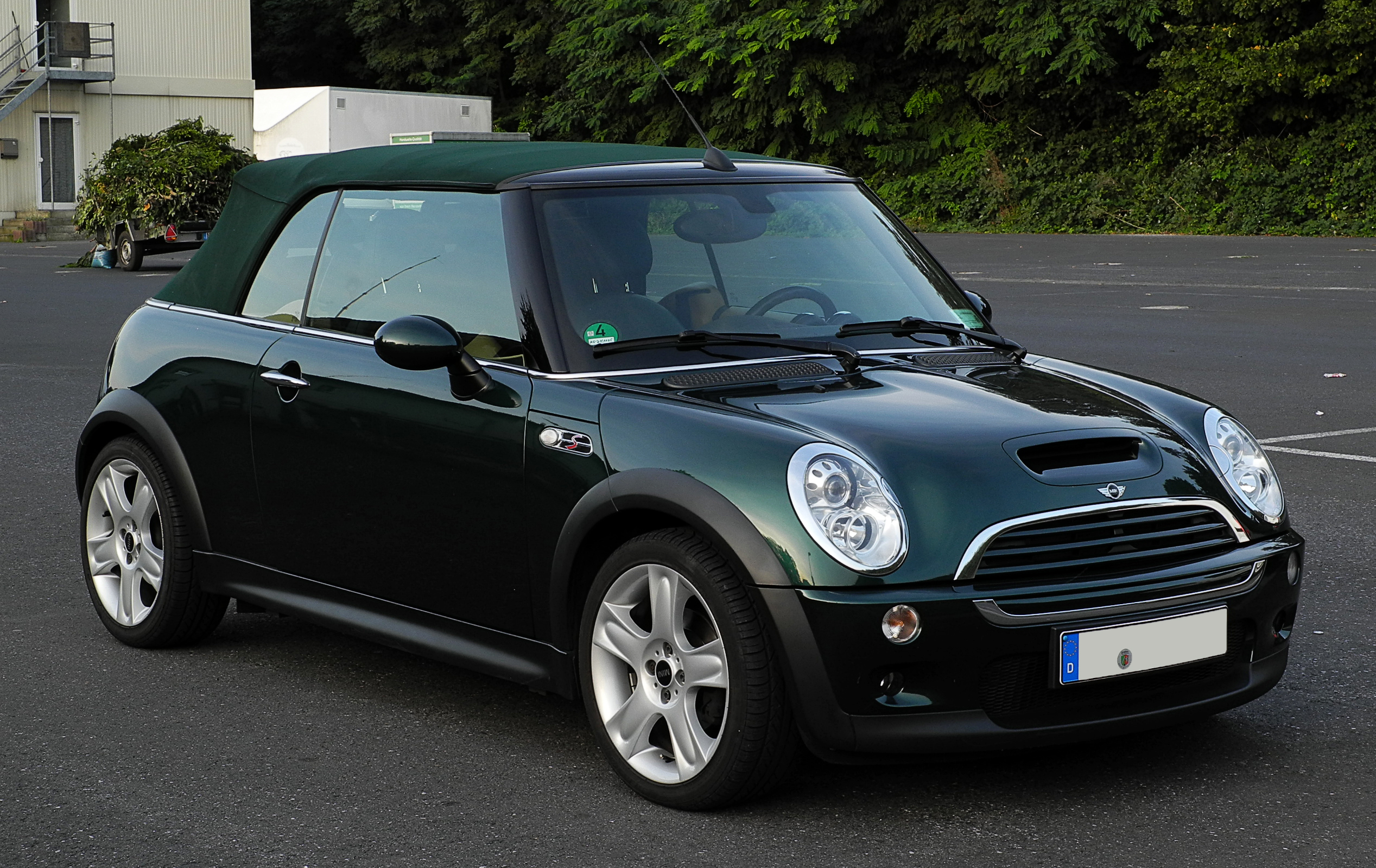

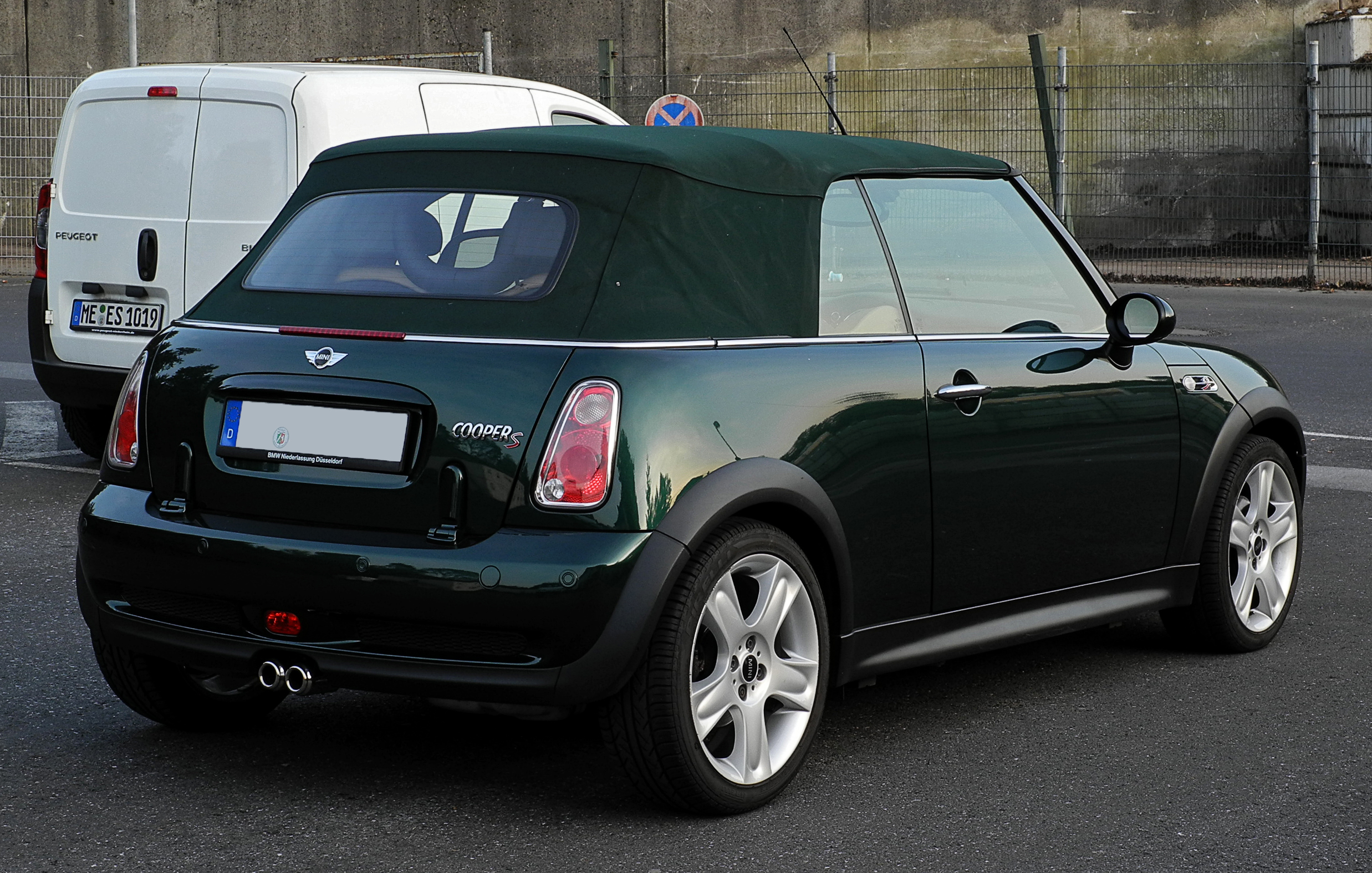
Convertible (2004–2008)

The first new generation Mini Hatch was introduced in July 2001, being the first model launched under the Mini marque after the original Mini was discontinued the year before. In some European markets, the Mini One was powered by a 1.4-litre (85 cu in) inline-four version of the Tritec engine, but all other petrol powered Minis used the 1.6-litre (98 cu in) version. Naturally aspirated Cooper hatchbacks receive the R50 model code, while the supercharged Cooper S is called the R53. From 2004 to 2008, a soft-top convertible (R52) was also made.

Though still considered very compact, the 2001 hatchback's 3.63 m (143 in) length was 58 cm (22.8 in), or 19%, greater than the 3.05 m (10.0 ft) long 1959 Mini. Also, at 3.98 m (157 in), the 2002 five-door hatch stands 68 cm (26.8 in), or some 21%, longer than the original 3.30 m (130 in) Mini estate versions.

There are numerous styling and badging differences between the models, including the Cooper S having a distinctive scoop cut into the bonnet. The Cooper S also has twin exhausts which exit under the centre of the rear valance. The non-S Cooper has more chrome parts than the Mini One and has a single exhaust. The Mini One D has no visible exhaust pipes at all.

In some markets, such as Australia and the US, only the Mini Cooper and Cooper S were offered. Other trim lines and special editions of note, sold in varying markets around the world, are the Mini Seven, Mini Park Lane, Mini Checkmate, and Mini Monte Carlo.

The first generation of the new Mini received a facelift in July 2004. This was also when the new convertible was introduced; it was not available with the pre-facelift design. Aside from minor design changes (mostly up front, and the steering wheel) and improved equipment, the Rover R65 manual gearbox was replaced with a Getrag five-speed for the MINI One and Cooper. This was referred to as the 2005 "model year" version in North America.

=== Models ===
The vehicles produced from 2001 until 2006 included four hatchback models (UK and some international markets: Hatch, US: Hardtop, other markets just plain Mini): the standard "Mini One", the diesel-engined "Mini One/D", the sportier "Mini Cooper" and the supercharged "Mini Cooper S"; in 2004, a convertible roof option was added to the Mk I line-up. In November 2006, BMW released a redesigned version of the Mini Hardtop as a 2007 model year vehicle.

From March 2002, the Mini was exported to Japan and sold at Japanese BMW dealerships as well as Yanase locations. The car complied with Japanese Government dimension regulations and the introduction of the Mini coincided with several vehicles in Japan that exhibited a retro look that Japanese car companies were offering.

The names Cooper and Cooper S are the names used for the sportier version of the classic Mini, which in turn come from the involvement of John Cooper and the Cooper Car Company. The Cooper heritage is further emphasised with the John Cooper Works (JCW) range of tuning options. The John Cooper Works company also created a higher spec model of the Mini Cooper S, the Mini Cooper S Works. It has a higher volume exhaust and air filter, and uprated brakes and suspension, and different 17-inch (430 mm) wheels from the S models.

A race-prepared version, with rear-wheel drive, called the Mini Cooper S3, competed in the Belcar championship from 2002.

==== Mini John Cooper Works GP Kit (2006) ====
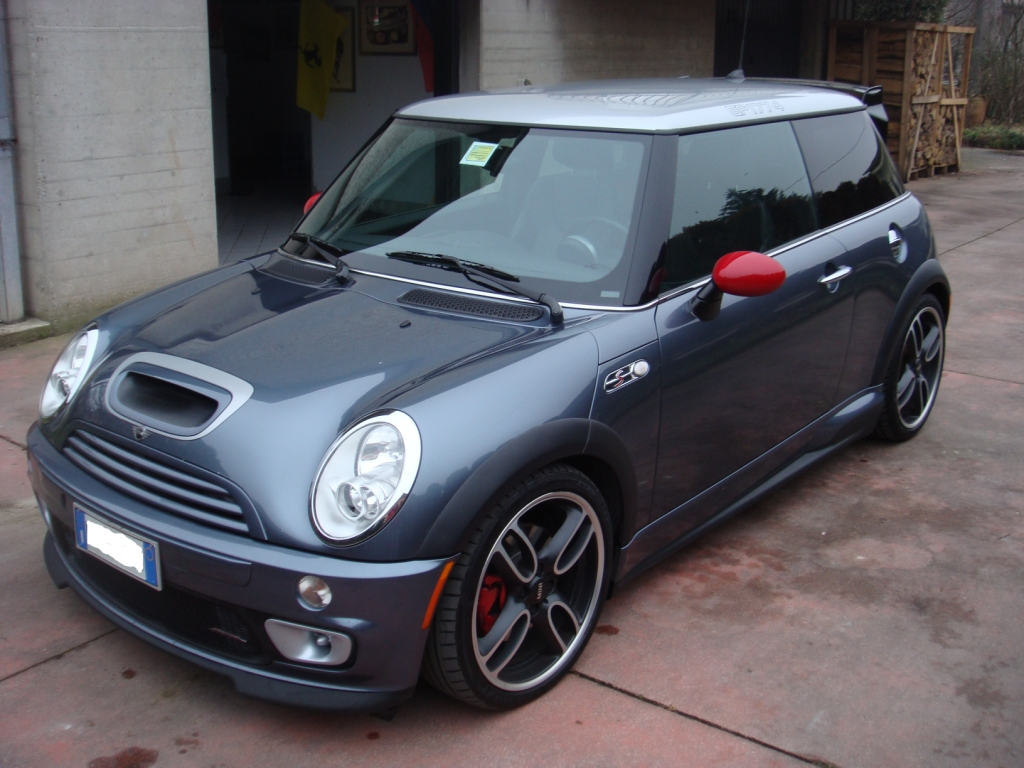
Mini John Cooper Works GP Kit

The last Mk I variant to be produced using the supercharged Tritec engine was the Mini Cooper S with John Cooper Works GP Kit, a light-weight, quasi-race-prepped John Cooper Works model. Hand-finished by Bertone in Italy, it was offered as a limited-production run of 2000 cars during the 2006 model year, with 444 of those originally intended for the UK market, although ultimately, 459 were sold. The GP has more bolstered Recaro front seats but had no rear seats, which along with reduced sound-deadening, removal of the rear wash-wipe system, optional air-conditioning and radio, and other weight-reduction steps, resulted in a weight saving of around 40 kg (88 lb) compared to a Cooper S.

Mechanically, it has a less restrictive intercooler, recalibrated engine management, high-volume injector nozzles, and a freer-flowing exhaust system. Extra cooling capabilities let the supercharged engine run longer on cooler temperatures for better track performance, rated at 218 PS (215 bhp; 160 kW) at 7100 rpm and 250 N⋅m (184 lb⋅ft) at 4600 rpm of torque.

=== Specifications ===
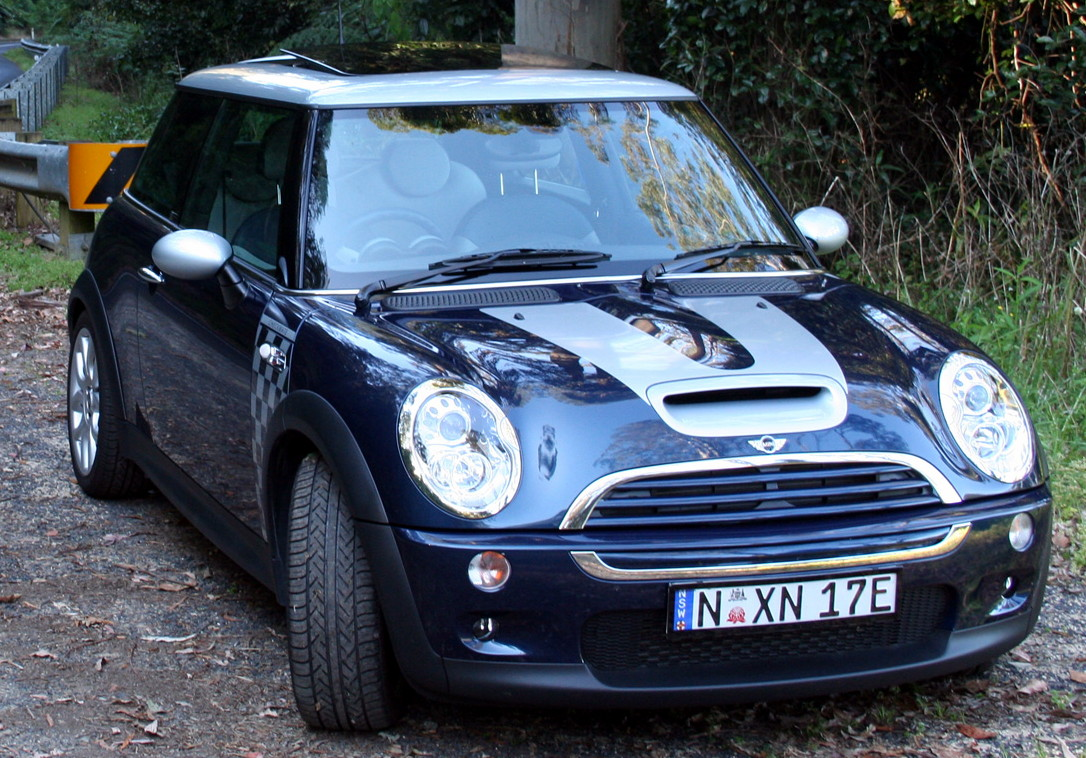
A 2006 Mini Cooper S Checkmate

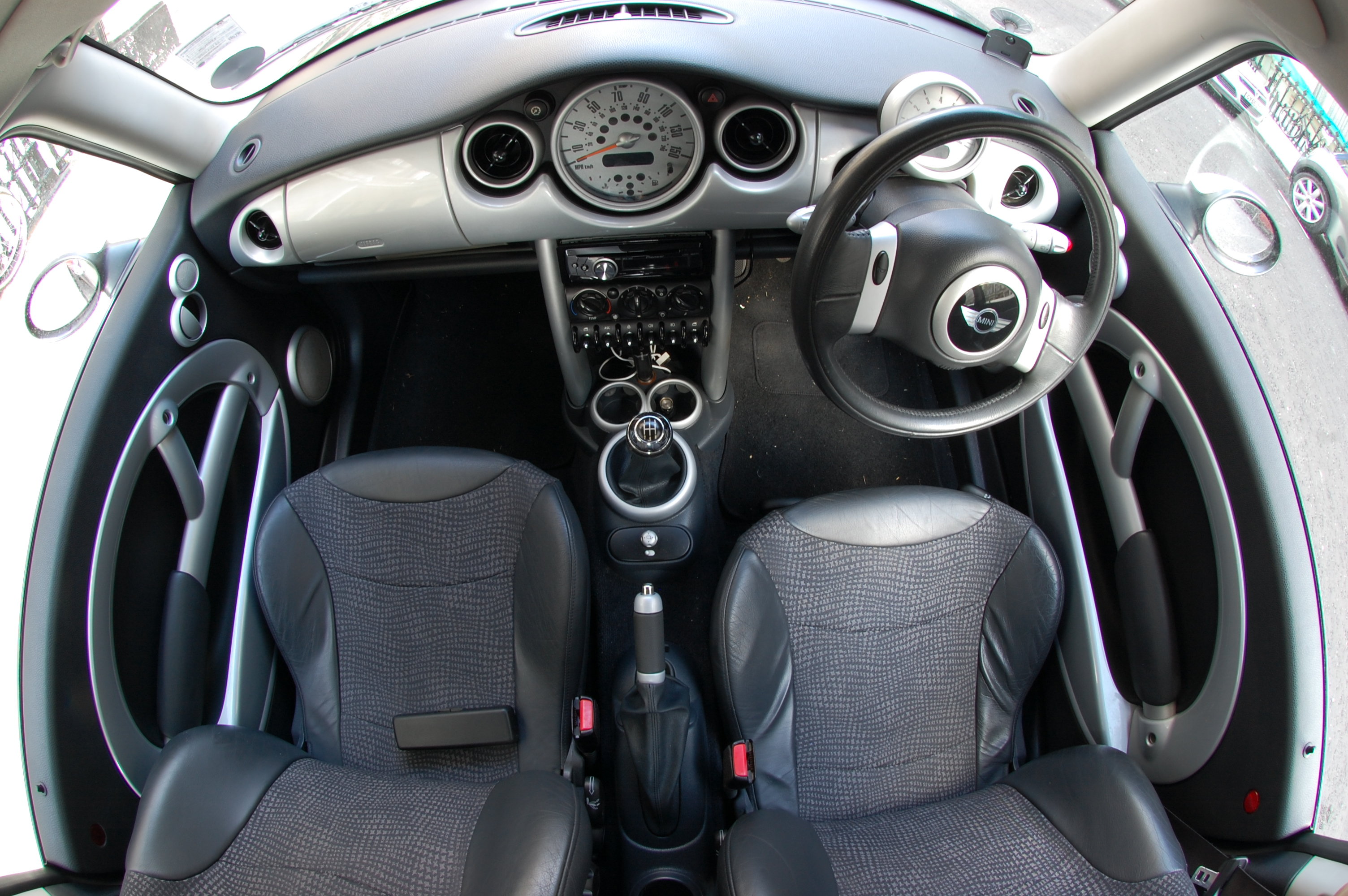
Interior (pre-facelift)

The Mk I Mini One, Cooper and Cooper S all used variants of the Brazilian-built Tritec engine, co-developed by US-based Chrysler and BMW; the Mini One D used a Toyota 1ND-TV diesel engine. In August 2006, BMW announced that future engines would be built in Great Britain, making the car essentially British-built again. Final assembly took place at Cowley, Oxford, and the body pressings were made in nearby Swindon at BMW's Swindon Pressings subsidiary.

All models used a transversely-mounted four-cylinder engine driving the front wheels. The wheels are pushed to the corners of the body to improve handling. The styling of the car, like that of the Volkswagen New Beetle, is a retro design that is deliberately reminiscent of the original Mini. The retro styling retains other classic Mini touches such as contrasting roof colours, optional bonnet stripes, optional rally lights, and black trim around the wheel arches and rocker panels that mimic the wide wheel flares found on many classic Minis.

The Mini One and Mini Cooper were available with a ZF VT1F continuously variable transmission or with a conventional Midlands (Rover R65) 5-speed manual transmission (model years 2002–2004); the latter was replaced with a Getrag 52BG 5-speed unit for the remainder of the Mk I production (2005–2006). The Cooper S came with a 6-speed Getrag G285 manual or an Aisin 6F21WA/TF60SN fully automatic transmission with paddle shifters. The gear ratios of the 6-speed Getrag manual transmission were changed from July 2004 production and onwards.

All Minis had a drive by wire electronic throttle, anti-lock brake electronic brakeforce distribution, and BMW Cornering Brake Control. Stability options were BMW's ASC traction control system and DSC electronic stability control, to improve control and handling in adverse conditions.

The addition of a supercharger to the Mk I Cooper S required that the battery be relocated into the rear of the car – leaving no room for a spare tyre, so the S models came with run-flat tyres.

=== Safety ===
ANCAP test results* Mini Cooper (2002)
Test	Score
Overall	4 /5 stars
Frontal offset	10.19/16
Side impact	14.38/16
Pole	2/2
Seat belt reminders	0/3
Whiplash protection	Not Assessed
Pedestrian protection	Poor
Electronic stability control	Not Assessed

== Second generation (R56/57; 2006) ==
Second generation
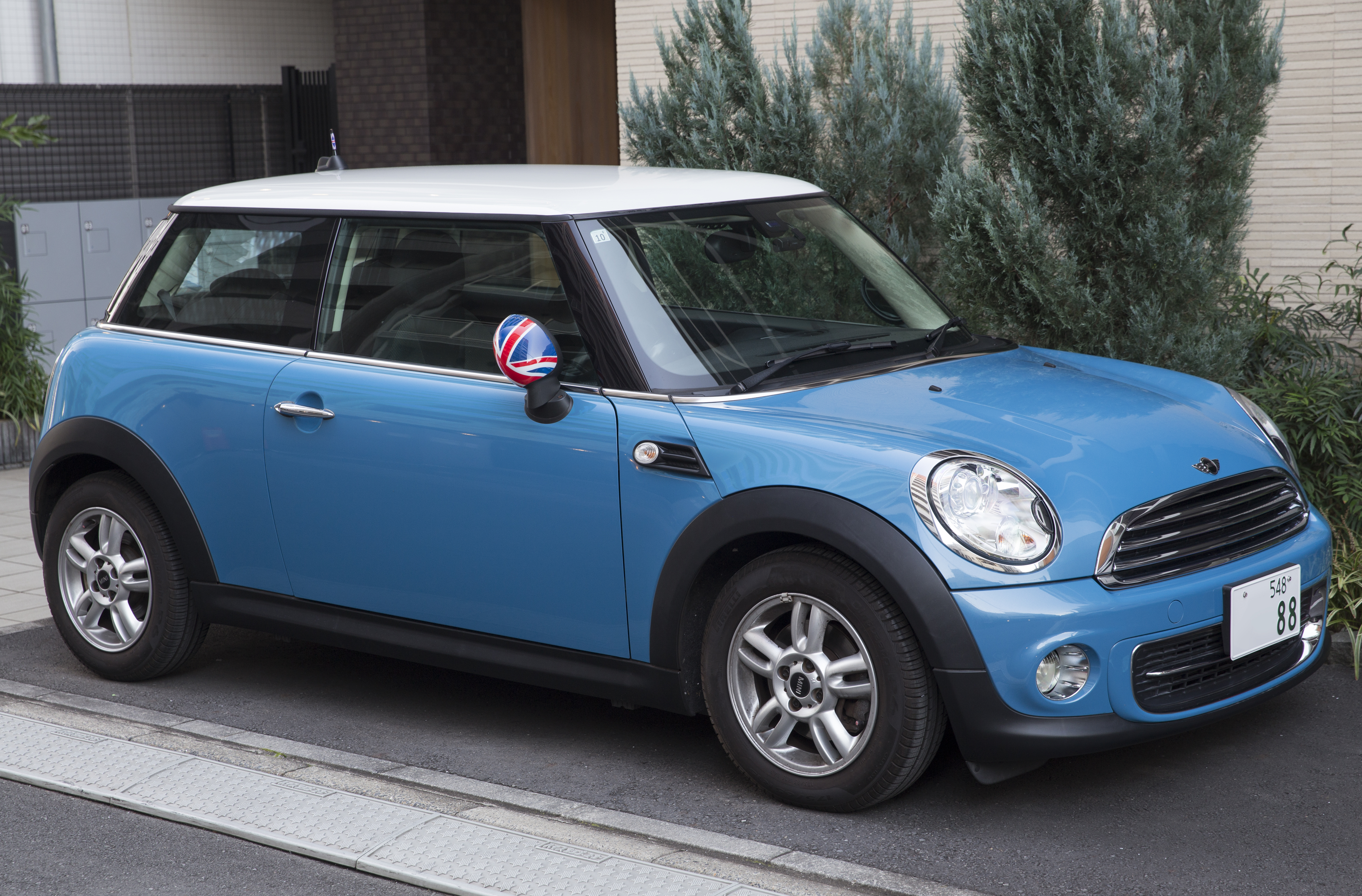
- Mini Cooper (R56; Japan)

Overview
- Model code: R56 (Hatch); R57 (Convertible)
- Production: July 2006 – November 2013 (Hatch); 2009–2015 (Convertible)
- Assembly: United Kingdom: Cowley, Oxfordshire (Plant Oxford)
- Designer: Marcus Syring

Body and chassis
- Body style: 3-door hatchback 2-door convertible

Powertrain
- Engine: Petrol: 1.4 L BMW/PSA Prince I4 (First and One); 1.6 L BMW/PSA Prince I4 (Cooper); 1.6 L BMW/PSA Prince turbo I4 (Cooper S); Diesel: 1.6 L Ford/PSA DV6 I4 (Cooper D); 1.6 L BMW N47 D16 I4 (One D/Cooper D); 2.0 L BMW N47 D20 I4 (Cooper SD)
- Transmission: 6-speed manual / Steptronic

Dimensions
- Wheelbase: 2,467 mm (97.1 in)
- Length: 2007–2010: 3,698 mm (145.6 in); 2007–2010 S: 3,713 mm (146.2 in); 2011–2014: 3,729 mm (146.8 in)
- Width: 1,684 mm (66.3 in)
- Height: 1,407 mm (55.4 in)
- Kerb weight: 1,150 kg (2,535 lb) (Cooper); 1,210 kg (2,668 lb) (Cooper S)

BMW introduced an all-new, second generation of the Hardtop/Hatch Mini model in November 2006, on a re-engineered platform incorporating many stylistic and engineering changes. It uses the Prince engine, the architecture of which is shared with PSA Peugeot Citroën and is designed to be more cost-effective and fuel-efficient, and is manufactured at the BMW Hams Hall engine plant in Warwickshire, Great Britain. The engineering was done in the United Kingdom by BMW Group UK Engineering, in Munich, Germany at BMW Group headquarters, and by other third parties, BMW Group hired Italdesign Giugiaro (IDG) in Turin, to coordinate the engineering, including the development and validation of the body, structure and chassis of the new Mini. Key Production Associates from affected areas in the assembly process at Plant Oxford were seconded to IDG for the duration of the build to ensure a smooth integration of the new model back in Oxford.

Initially launched in the Cooper and Cooper S trim levels; the range was completed in 2007 with the Mk II Mini One. An economical version called the First was added in 2009. From April 2007 a diesel was available badged as the Cooper D, which was supplemented in 2010 by the lower powered One D and in January 2011 with a new 2.0 L diesel badged as the Cooper SD.

The second generation was again offered in Japan at Japanese BMW locations 24 February 2007, and it continued to be in compliance with Japanese Government dimension regulations which supported sales of both the hatchback and the convertible.

The second generation Convertible was unveiled at the Detroit Auto Show and the Geneva Motor Show as a 2009 model-year vehicle (first available for sale on 28 March 2009). The model has a device, marketed as the "Openometer", which records the number of minutes the vehicle has operated with its roof retracted.

=== Design ===
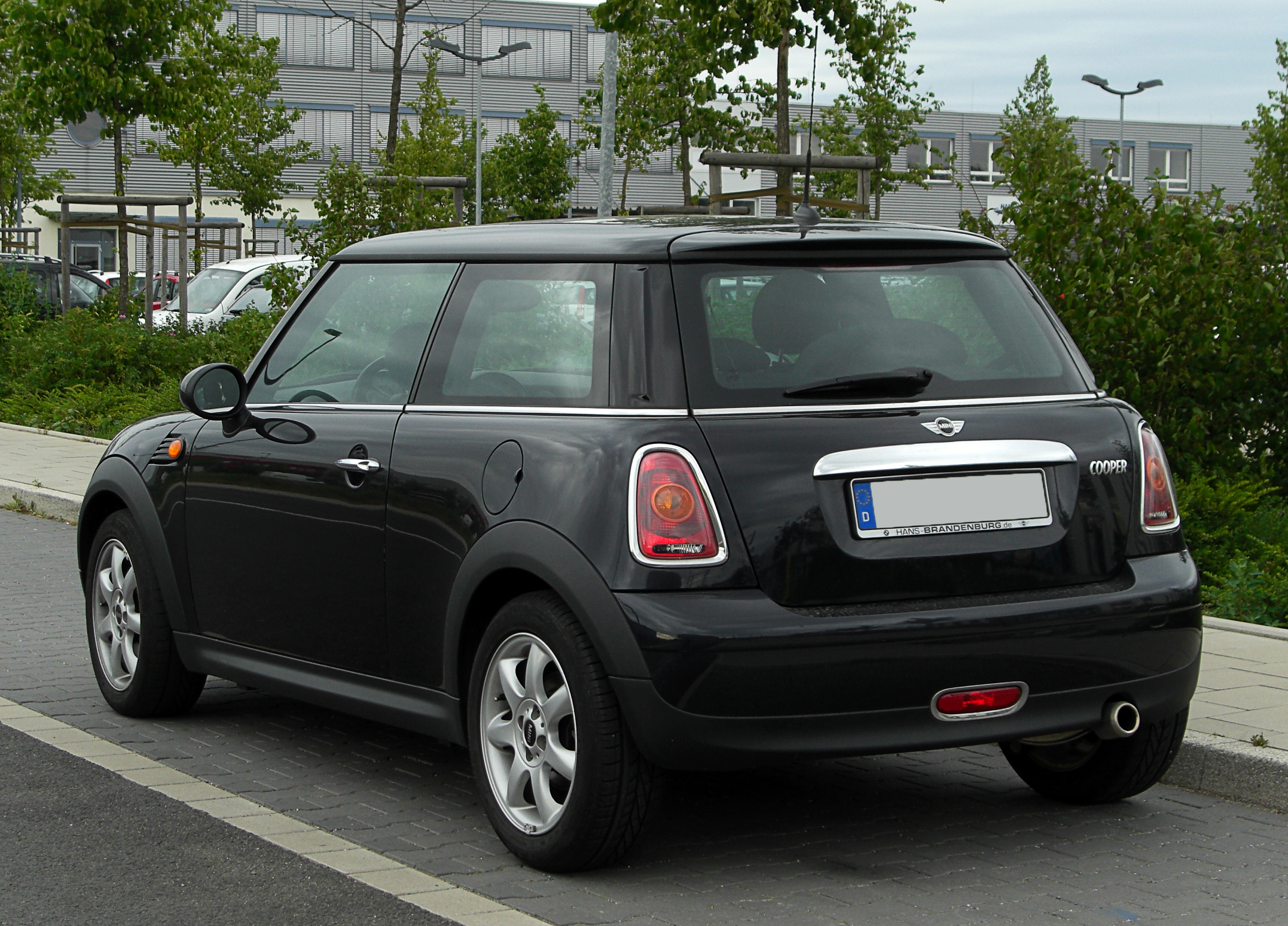
Hatch (pre-facelift)

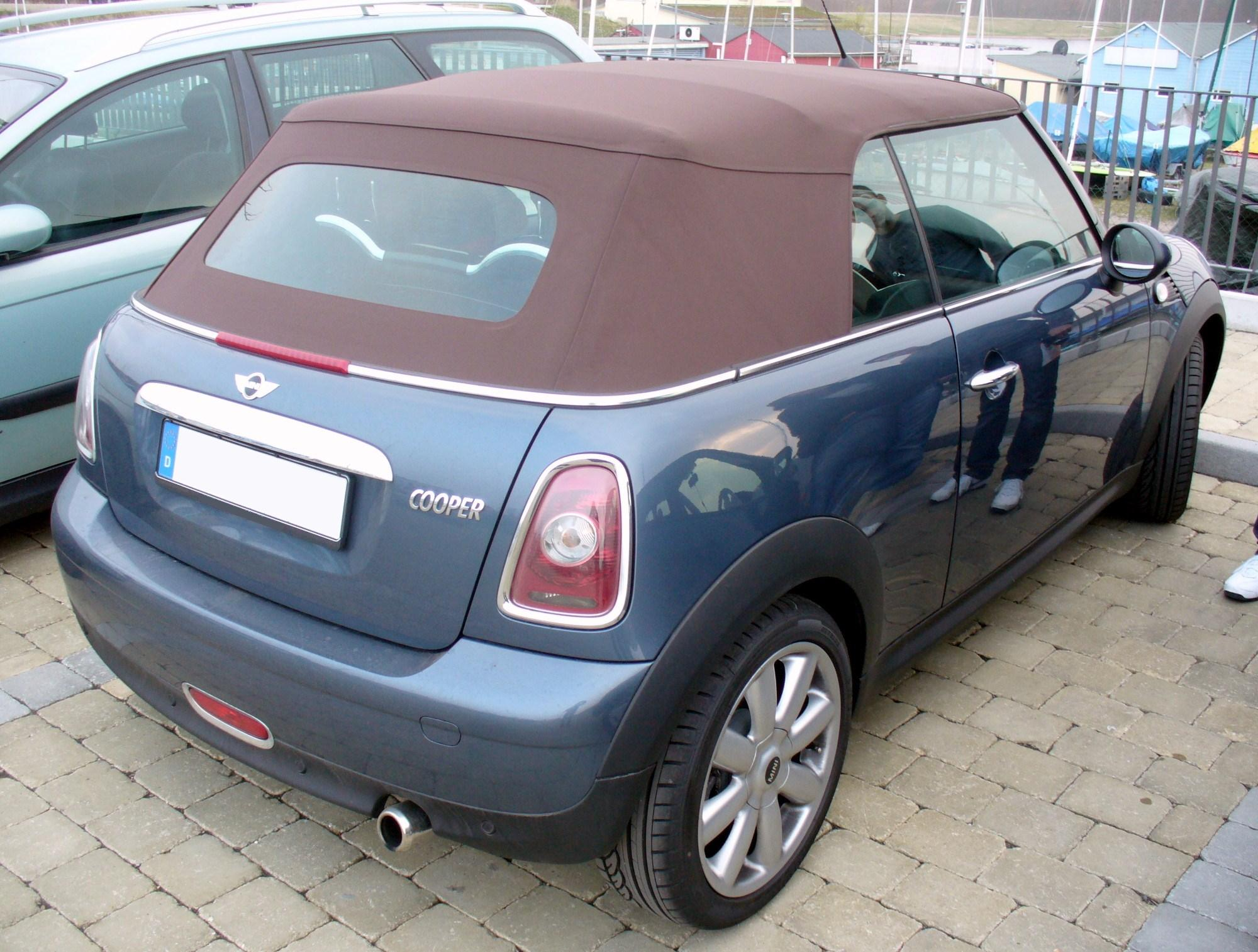
Cabrio (pre-facelift)

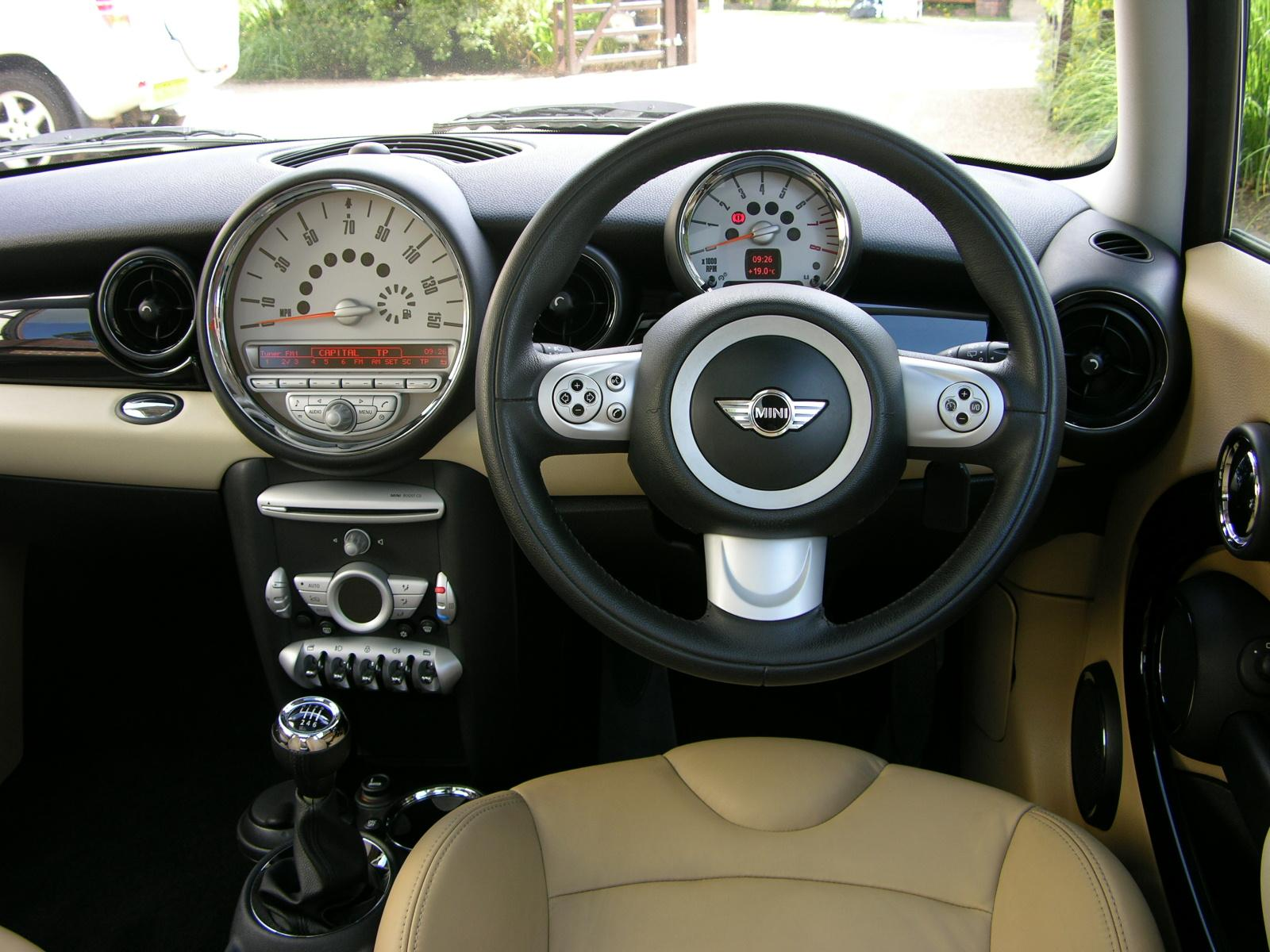
Interior

Though the Mk II has a familiar look, every panel on the new car was changed from the previous model. New pedestrian impact safety requirements lead to an overall length increase by 60 millimetres (2.4 in) and the bonnet raised, to create more space for the front end to yield in case of impact. Also, the indicators were moved up, integrated in the headlight units. The headlight units are now fixed inside the front quarter panels, rather than being integrated with the previous clamshell bonnet, so that they are no longer raised up with the opening bonnet. This was necessitated by United States law, requiring all essential lighting to henceforth be mounted to fixed, non-movable parts of a vehicle.

The car has a restyled grille and larger rear light clusters. The Cooper S retains the bonnet scoop in order to keep an association with the outgoing model – although the relocation of the intercooler to the front of the engine means that the scoop is now purely decorative. In addition, the Cooper S no longer has the battery located under the boot floor, instead being found in the more conventional location under the bonnet. The C-pillars are no longer encased in glass and have been shaped to improve aerodynamics and to reduce the tendency for dirt to accumulate on the back of the car. Much criticised for the lack of rear legroom, Mini added more space for rear passengers by creating sculpted cut-outs in the rear of the front seats. An engine start button replaces the conventional ignition key and, with the optional 'Comfort Access', the car may be unlocked with a button on the door handle when the key is brought close to the car.

In August 2010, for the 2011 model year, the Mini Hatch was given what Mini called a "Life Cycle Impulse" (LCI) [also used on BMW models] - better known as a facelift. The front bumper and foglights were redesigned for improved pedestrian protection, while the side marker lights and rear bumper were also redesigned. The taillights were also updated, with concentric rings. The interior was marked by some material upgrades, with an aim for a softer, less brittle feel.

=== Technical specifications ===
The Cooper and Cooper S models offer a new rear axle and aluminium components to reduce the car's weight; and a Sports kit option comprising harder springs, damper and anti-roll bars is offered with both variants. Another key difference is the introduction of an upgraded electric power steering system, the sharpness of which can be increased by pressing a "Sport" button in front of the gear lever (both auto and manual); additionally, the "Sport" button adjusts the response of the accelerator, and in conjunction with automatic transmission, also allows the engine to rev almost to the redline before changing gear.

In the Cooper model, the W11 Tritec four-cylinder engine was replaced with a 120 PS (88 kW) 1.6-litre Prince engine incorporating BMW's Valvetronic infinitely variable valve lift, developed on and with Peugeot's core engine. It has been reported in road tests that this takes the car from 0–100 km/h in a claimed 9.1 seconds (0–60 mph: 8.5 seconds) and has a top speed of 201 km/h (125 mph). Fuel economy of 48.7 miles per imperial gallon (5.80 L/100 km; 40.6 mpg_{‑US}) on the combined cycle is nearly 8 miles per imperial gallon (6.7 mpg_{‑US}) better. The more powerful 175 PS (129 kW) Cooper S replaces the supercharger with a new twin scroll turbocharger N14 DOHC motor in the interests of efficiency, and has petrol direct injection; consequently, this engine version does not have Valvetronic. This engine also has an "overboost" function which temporarily raises the torque by 20 N⋅m (15 lbf⋅ft) under hard acceleration. As a result, 0–100 km/h is covered in a claimed 7.1 seconds (0–60 mph: 6.7 seconds), and top speed is 230 km/h (140 mph). It achieves similar improvements in fuel economy to the Cooper, returning 40.9 mpg_{‑imp} (6.91 L/100 km; 34.1 mpg_{‑US}) combined. Both engines may be mated to either a 6-speed manual or automatic gearbox. The turbocharged engine is the same (although with some French engineering modifications) as the one in the Peugeot 207 GTi/RC.

In 2011 the Peugeot DV6 (Ford DLD-416) engine was replaced with the 1.6 and 2.0 BMW N47 Diesels.

All Mk II models with optional Dynamic Stability Control (DSC) also include "Hill Assist", which prevents the car from rolling backwards on an incline by holding the brakes for 2 seconds after the driver releases the brake pedal, allowing the driver time to engage the accelerator pedal without the vehicle drifting down-hill. Also included with DSC is hydraulic Emergency Brake Assist (EBA) as opposed to the mechanical system on Minis without DSC. DSC became standard on all Minis from September 2008.

The interior of the Mk II echoes the style of the earlier model, but is in fact a complete redesign. The boot of the new car has an additional 10 litres (2.2 imp gal; 2.6 US gal) of load space. The gauges also went through a redesign, the gauge needle covers were made smaller and less round, and a small bar for radio text below the speedometer was added on the pre-LCI (pre-facelift) models, whereas the LCI (facelift) models had a larger infotainment screen, and the speedometer was integrated around said screen. Other changes in design – both visible and otherwise – have contributed to the Mini's recently awarded five stars in the Euro NCAP tests. One example is the higher front bonnet, which now complies with the European pedestrian collision regulations.

Breakdown statistics reported by the German Automobile Club (ADAC) in May 2010 placed the Mini at the top of the small car class in respect of the low break-down rates achieved for cars aged between 0 and 4 years, narrowly beating the Ford Fusion and Mitsubishi Colt.

=== Safety ===
Euro NCAP test results* MINI Cooper 1.6 (RHD) (2007)
Test	Score	Rating
Adult occupant:	33	5 /5 stars
Child occupant:	29	3 /5 stars
Pedestrian:	14	2 /4 stars

ANCAP test results* Mini Cooper (2007)
Test	Score
Overall	4 /5 stars
Frontal offset	13.02/16
Side impact	14.49/16
Pole	2/2
Seat belt reminders	0/3
Whiplash protection	Not Assessed
Pedestrian protection	Marginal
Electronic stability control	Optional

=== Model range ===
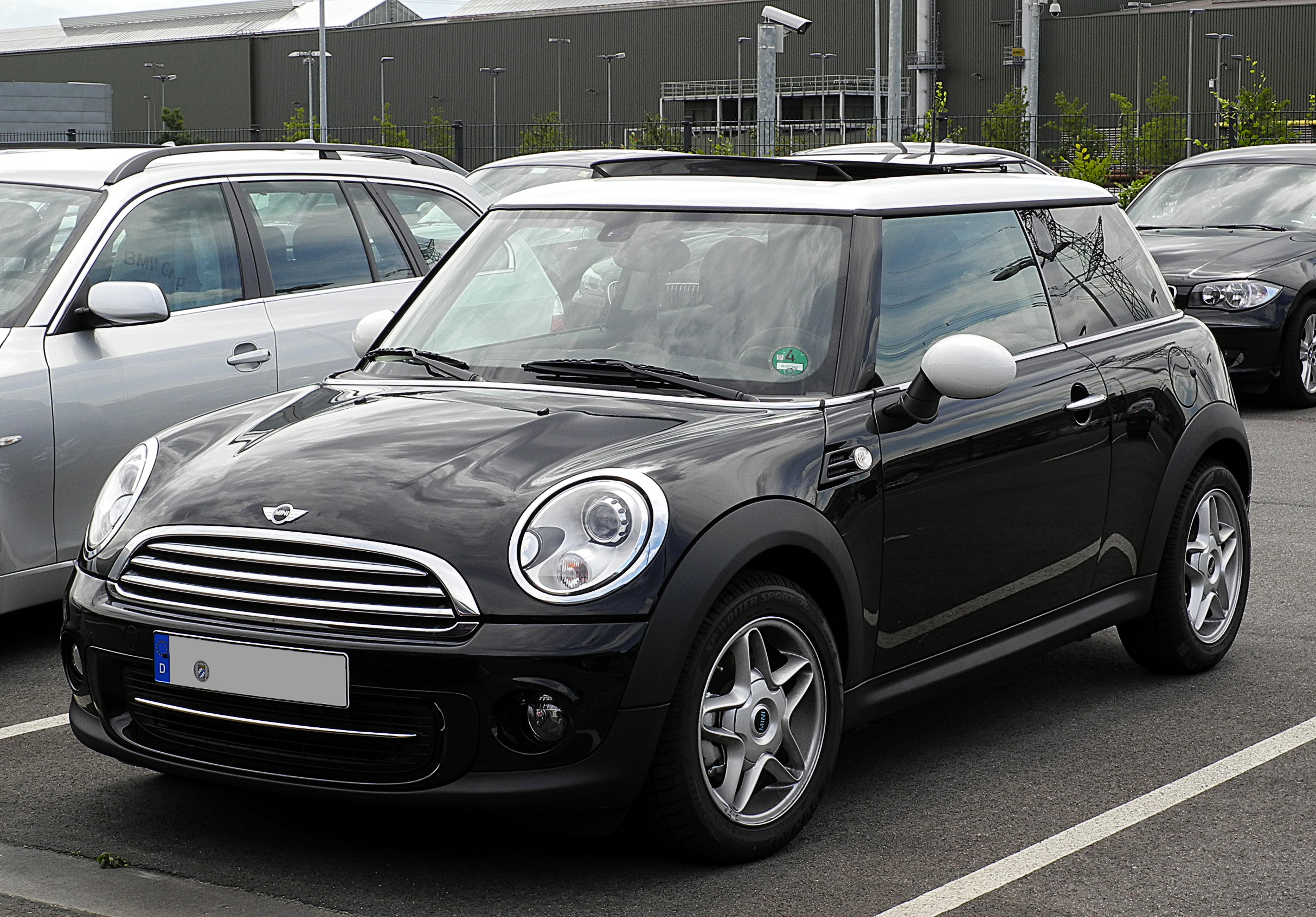

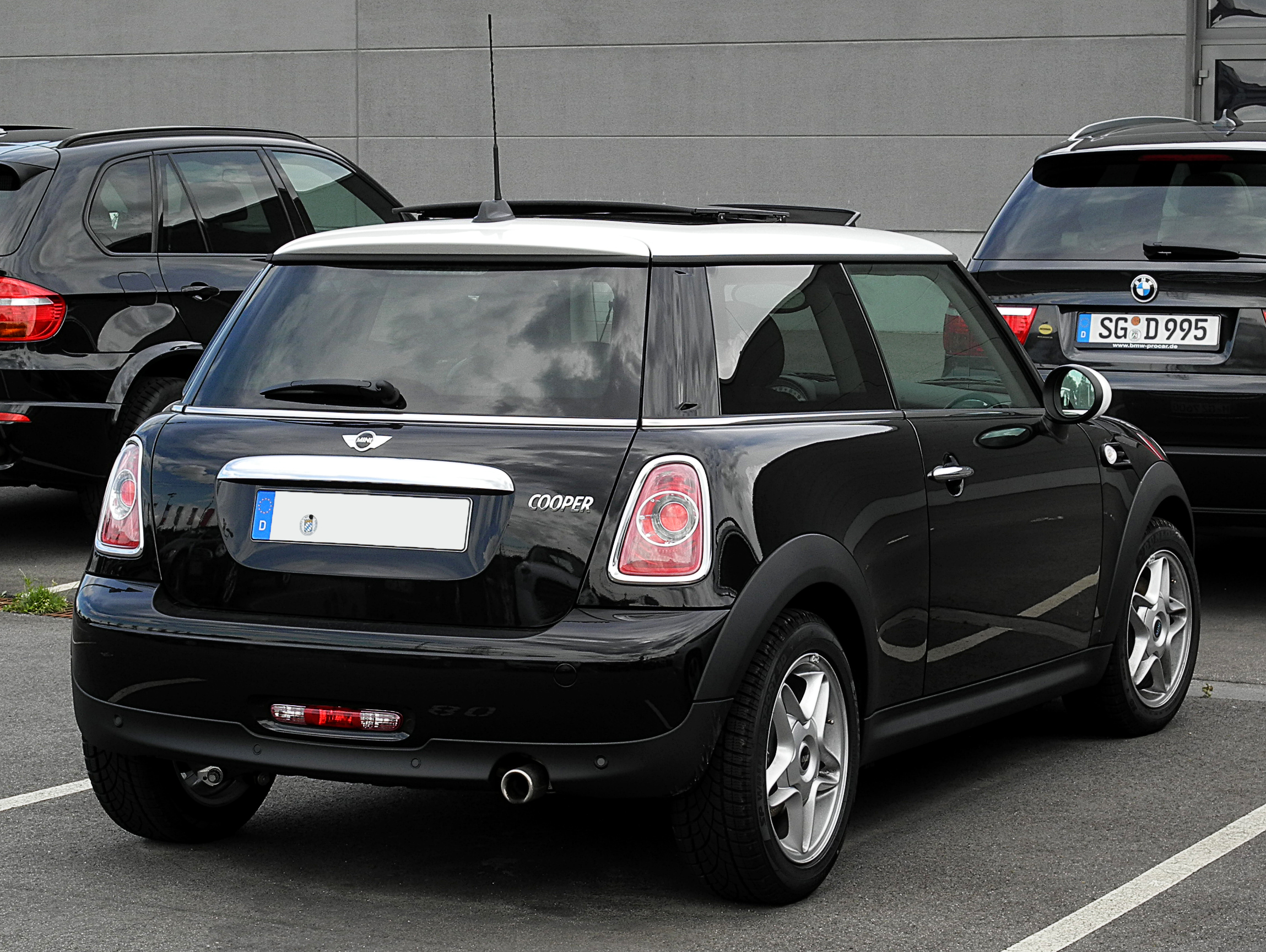
Hatch (facelift)

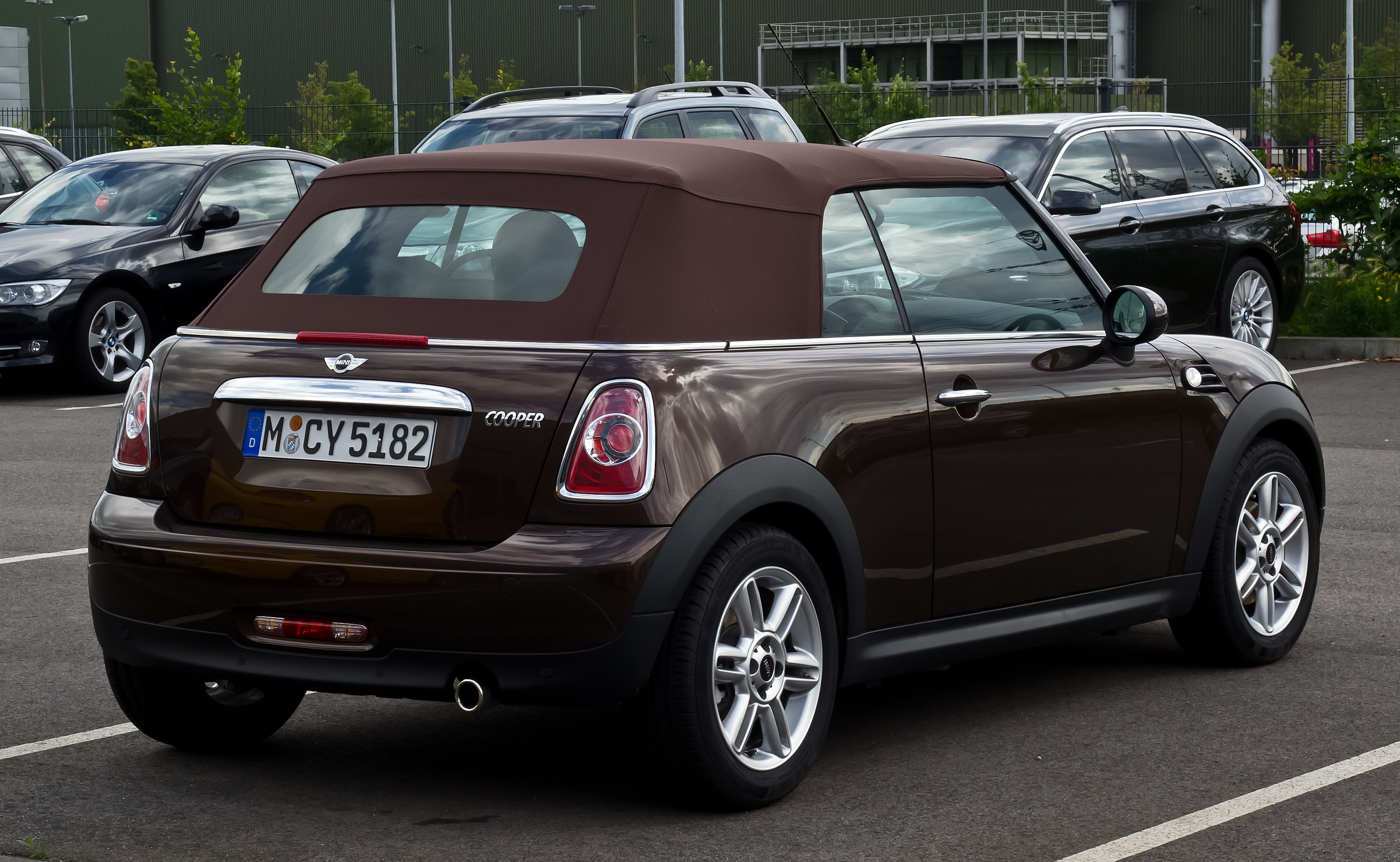
Cabrio (facelift)

The Mk II range was launched with the One, Cooper and Cooper S derivatives. In July 2009, a new budget version called Mini First was added, 50 years after the launch of the original car. Introduced with a base MSRP of £10,950, It had a similar, but lower output 1.4L 75 PS (55 kW) engine to the One, but with no automatic option. The 1.4L engine was replaced by a 1.6L version, producing the same 75 PS in 2010. The First preempted the launch of the One Minimalism by including the Mini Minimalism technologies. In January 2010 the Mini One Minimalism was announced, which was available in two states of tune depending on the market: (75 PS (55 kW) and 98 PS (72 kW)). The model was marketed as a more environmentally friendly option with low 119 grams (4.2 oz) per kilometre carbon dioxide (CO_{2}) helped by low resistance tyres and flush wheel trims, and included the Minimalism technologies previously excluded from the Mini One. When the Life Cycle Impulse (LCI) was released in 2010, the Mini Ray was released, exclusive to Australia and Italy. It has styling features much like the One for other markets, with a two-spoke steering wheel, less chrome around the exterior, and exclusive steel wheel covers. In spring 2011, a new diesel Mini Cooper SD was launched. With a new four-cylinder 2.0 L turbo diesel engine, it had an output of 145 PS (107 kW) and maximum torque of 305 N⋅m (225 lbf⋅ft) between 1,750 and 2,700 rpm.

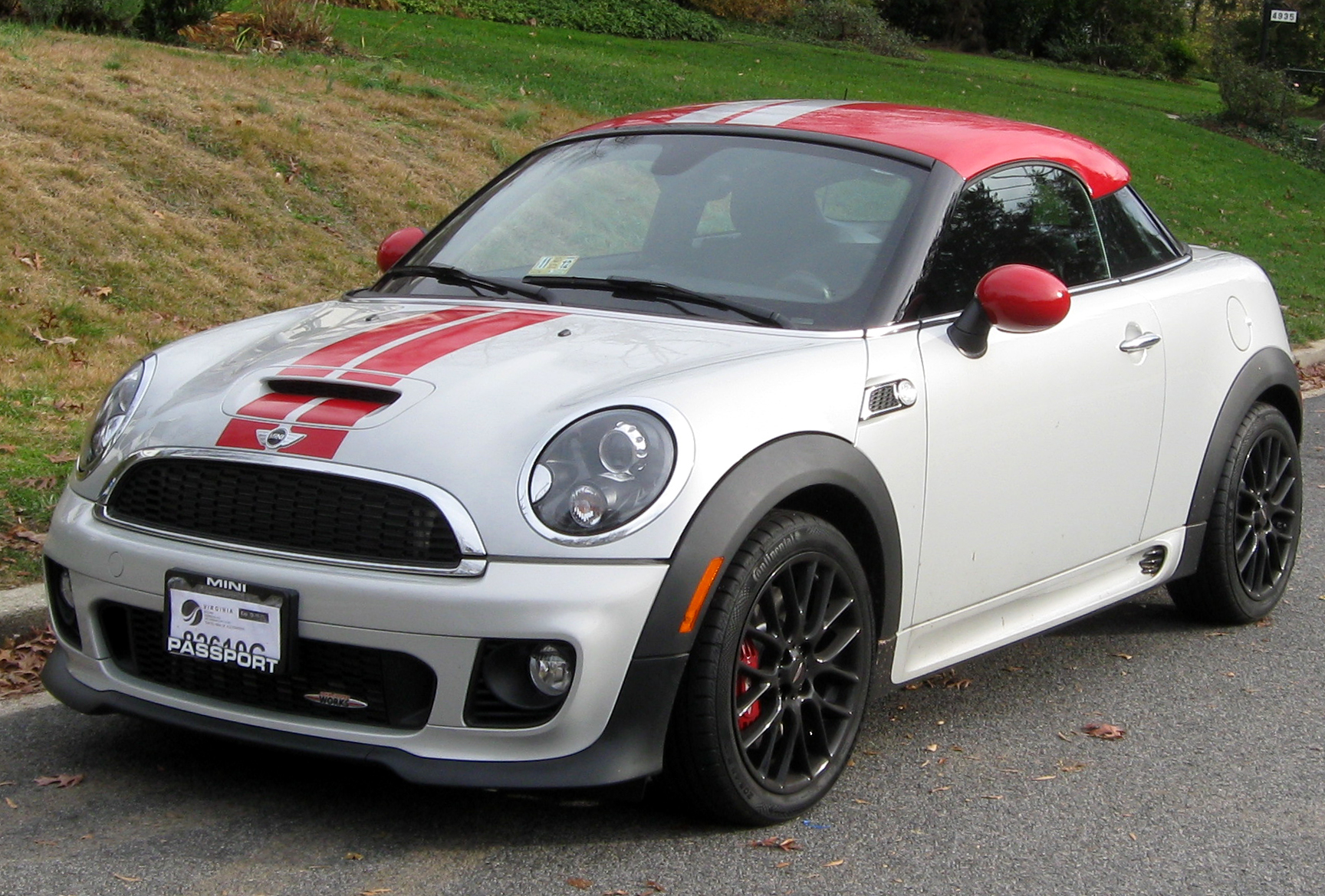
2012 John Cooper Works Coupe

=== Mini Coupé and Roadster (R58/59; 2011; 2012) ===
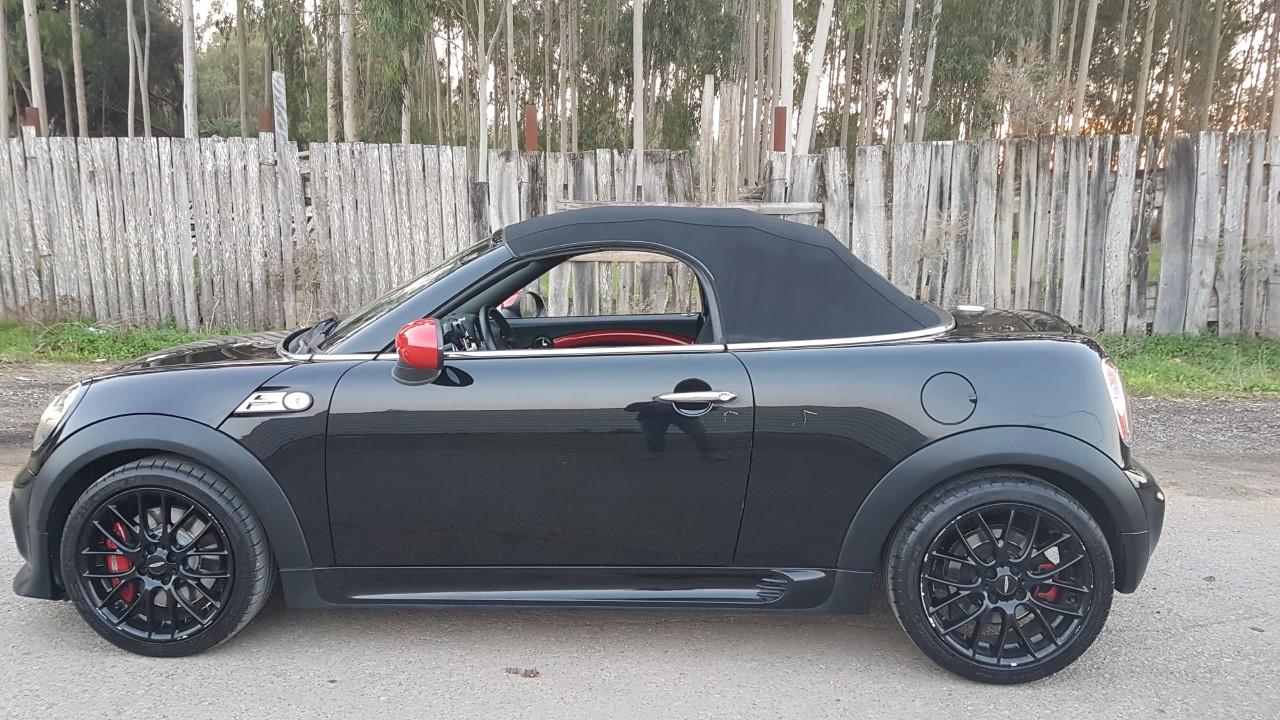
2014 John Cooper Works Roadster

In 2011 and 2012 respectively, the Mini Mk II line-up was expanded with a coupé like the model first shown in 2009, as well as a roadster model. Both are strict two-seater models, which was a first for a BMW Mini, derived from the Mini convertible. The roadster's soft-top is either manually or electrically operated, depending on market.

==== Mini John Cooper Works Challenge (2008–2014) ====
The Mini John Cooper Works Challenge is a purpose-built race car, based on the R56 Hardtop, and manufactured in the BMW Motorsport factory located in Munich. The Challenge was unveiled in 2007 at the Frankfurt IAA Motor Show.

The BMW Motorsport factory has been responsible for the construction of Formula One and European touring cars for many years. The R56 Challenge has a six-speed manual transmission; 17-inch Borbet wheels with Dunlop control slick racing tyres; John Cooper Works aerodynamic kit including front splitter, rear diffuser, and high-downforce, adjustable rear wing; race-specific AP Racing ABS braking system; KW suspension rebound; height- and camber-adjustable coilover suspension; full roll cage; Recaro bucket seat with six-point safety belt; HANS device; Sparco racing steering wheel; air jack system; and a fully electronic fire extinguishing system.

The car has a 1.6-litre, twin-scroll turbocharged engine that produces 155 kW (211 PS; 208 hp) at 6,000 rpm, along with 261 N⋅m (193 lb⋅ft) of torque. Acceleration from 0–100 km/h (62 mph) is claimed at 6.1 seconds, and braking time from 100–0 km/h is 3.1 seconds.

The car was used for events such as the Australian Mini Challenge, as well as ADAC events, and championships in Britain, Italy and Switzerland. Robbie Davis won the 2013 Pirelli World Challenge.

==== Mini John Cooper Works (2009–2014) ====
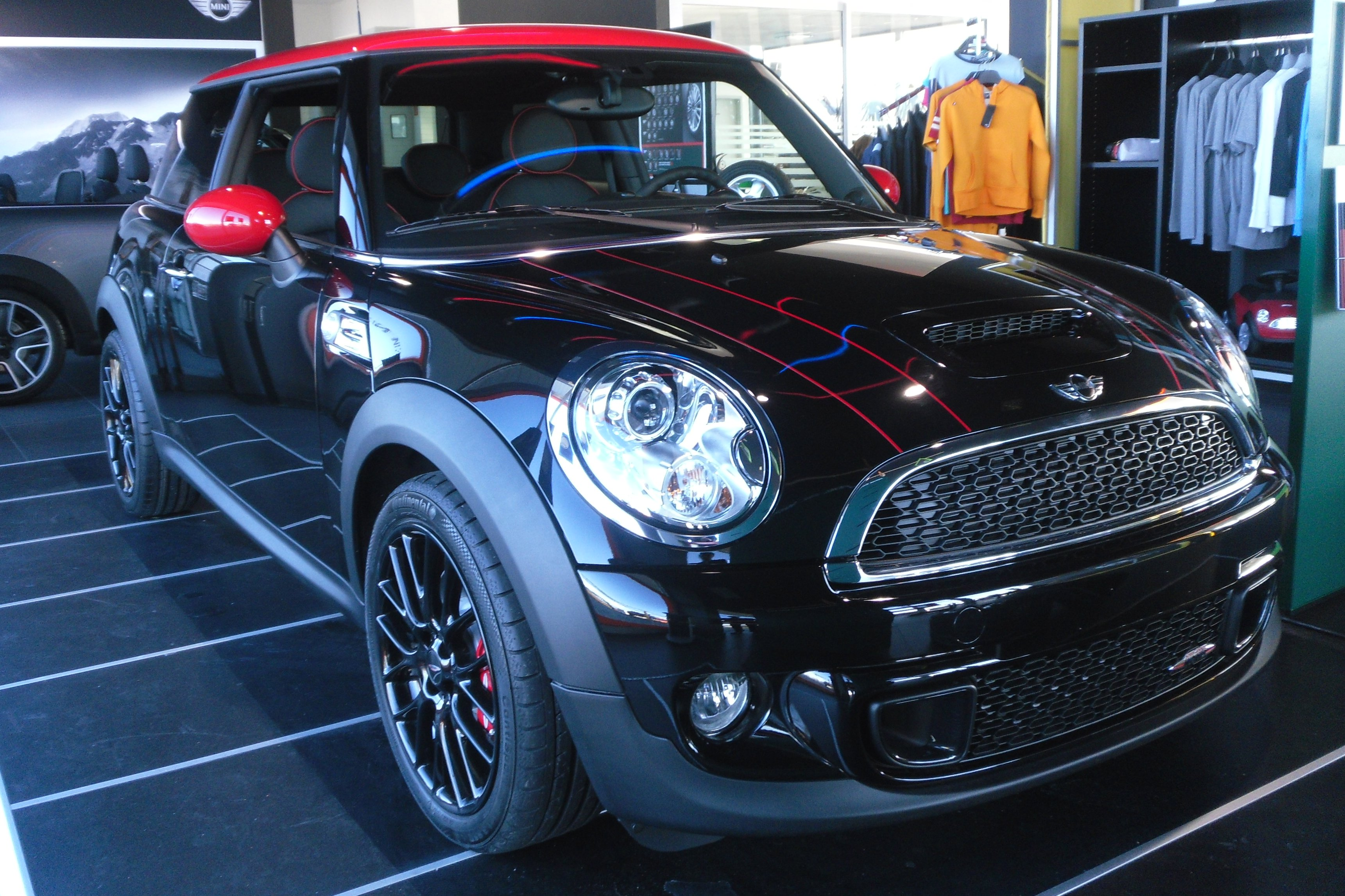
Mini John Cooper works model year 2011

Loosely based on the John Cooper Works (JCW) Challenge car, these are essentially Cooper S vehicles with a higher-output engine; a low-back-pressure exhaust system; a stiffer sport suspension; 17-inch light alloy rims with low-profile, performance tyres; Brembo performance brakes; and BMW's dynamic stability control (DSC) and Dynamic Traction control system (DTC) with Electronic Differential Lock Control (EDLC) as standard equipment. All JCW models are only available with a specific Getrag 6-speed manual transmission, and come with distinctive "John Cooper Works" badging in place of the normal "Cooper S" badging. The JCW vehicles are also factory-built, which further distinguishes them from earlier Mk II Cooper S models with any of the available John Cooper Works accessories (engine and suspension upgrades, aerodynamics kit, etc.) that are dealer-installed. All JCW models achieve the same EPA fuel economy ratings as their Cooper S counterparts.

The engine is rated at 211 PS (155 kW; 208 hp) and 261 N⋅m (193 lb⋅ft); under heavy acceleration, the engine automatically boosts torque output to a peak of 279 N⋅m (206 lb⋅ft). These figures are achieved by reducing compression ratio to 10.0:1, and increasing boost from 0.9 bar (13 psi) to 1.3 bar (19 psi) when compared to the turbocharged engine used in the Cooper S. According to Mini, the JCW Hardtop will sprint to 97 km/h (60 mph) in 6.2 seconds, with the JCW Clubman clocking in at 6.5 seconds; both vehicles top out at 237 km/h (147 mph)

The JCW variants were unveiled in 2008 at the Geneva Auto Show, as 2009 model-year vehicles. Seven cars were entered into the 2011 24 Hours of Nürburgring, coming 4th in class and 34th overall. In 2012, team Partl Motorsport finished in 2nd place in its class with their endurance MINI, finishing in a strong 41st place overall.

The BMW MINI Rallycross Championship, a one-make series, was a support category for the British Rallycross Championship.

==== Mini John Cooper Works World Championship 50 (2009) ====
This is a limited-edition (originally planned to be 250 units, then subsequently increased to 500, including 100 units delivered in the UK and 50 in the US) of the John Cooper Works Hardtop. It commemorates the 50th anniversary of the victories by Cooper driver Jack Brabham in the 1959 World Championship of Drivers and by Cooper in the 1959 International Cup for F1 Manufacturers.

The production vehicle was inspired by John Cooper's son, Mike. It includes the John Cooper Works aerodynamics package; John Cooper Works Cross Spoke Challenge light-alloy wheels in Jet Black; specific body paint colours (Connaught Green body with Pepper White roof and bonnet stripes), carbon fibre bonnet scoop, rear diffuser, exterior mirror caps and tailgate handle; and specific interior colour scheme (Carbon Black interior with red knee-rolls, armrests and red stitching on the floor mats, gearshift & handbrake gaiters). The John Cooper signature was provided by "John" Michael Cooper.

The car was unveiled at the 2009 Mini United Festival in Silverstone.

==== Mini John Cooper Works GP (2012–2014) ====
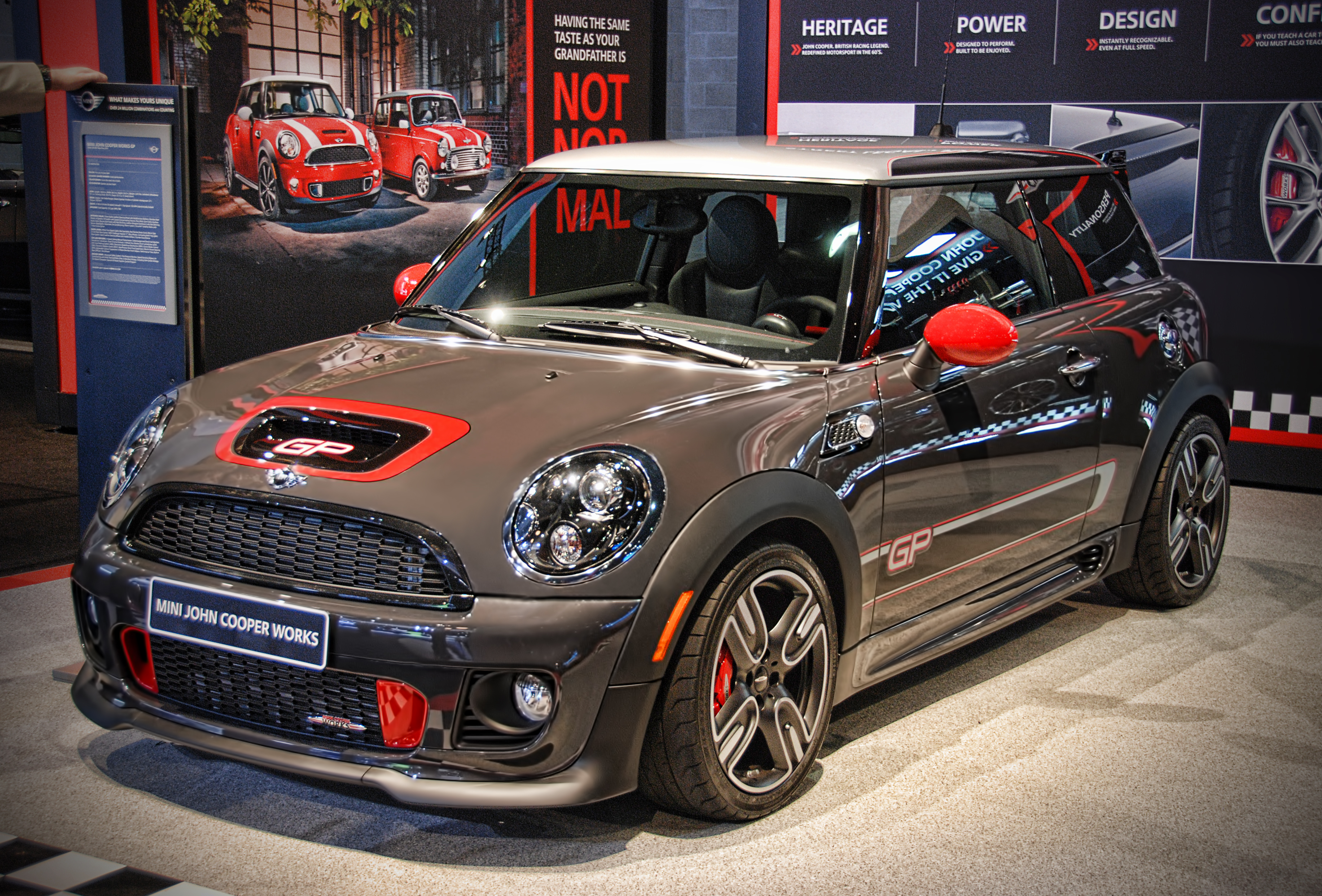
2013 Mini John Cooper Works GP shown at the LA Auto Show on 5 December 2012

The Mini John Cooper Works GP is a limited-edition model run of 2000 units. The GP is a fast road and track focused performance edition, and a celebration before the new Mini variant arrives.

The GP features additional performance, with 218 PS (215 bhp; 160 kW) at 6000 rpm and 280 N⋅m (207 lbf⋅ft) of torque at 2000–5100 rpm from a larger turbo and engine internals, larger front brakes with 6-pot calipers developed by Brembo, coilover suspension developed by Mini and Bilstein, lightweight 17" x 7.5" wheels, semi-slick tyres developed by Kumho specifically for the GP, rear diffuser and carbon kevlar flat under-tray, carbon-fibre rear spoiler, 'GP Mode' traction control system, weight saving by the removal of the rear seats and fitting of Recaro sports seats for driver and front passenger.

Styling features include specific vinyl stickers on the bonnet, roof, and door panels, GP badging on the boot lid. Interior includes a new gearknob, leather with red stitching, rear upper strut bar (non-structural) and GP badging on the dash.

All 2000 units were produced in the same specification, with the only option from new being an all-weather tyre, rather than the semi-slick tyre developed by Kumho. Left and right hand drives of this model exist.

=== Special editions and packages ===
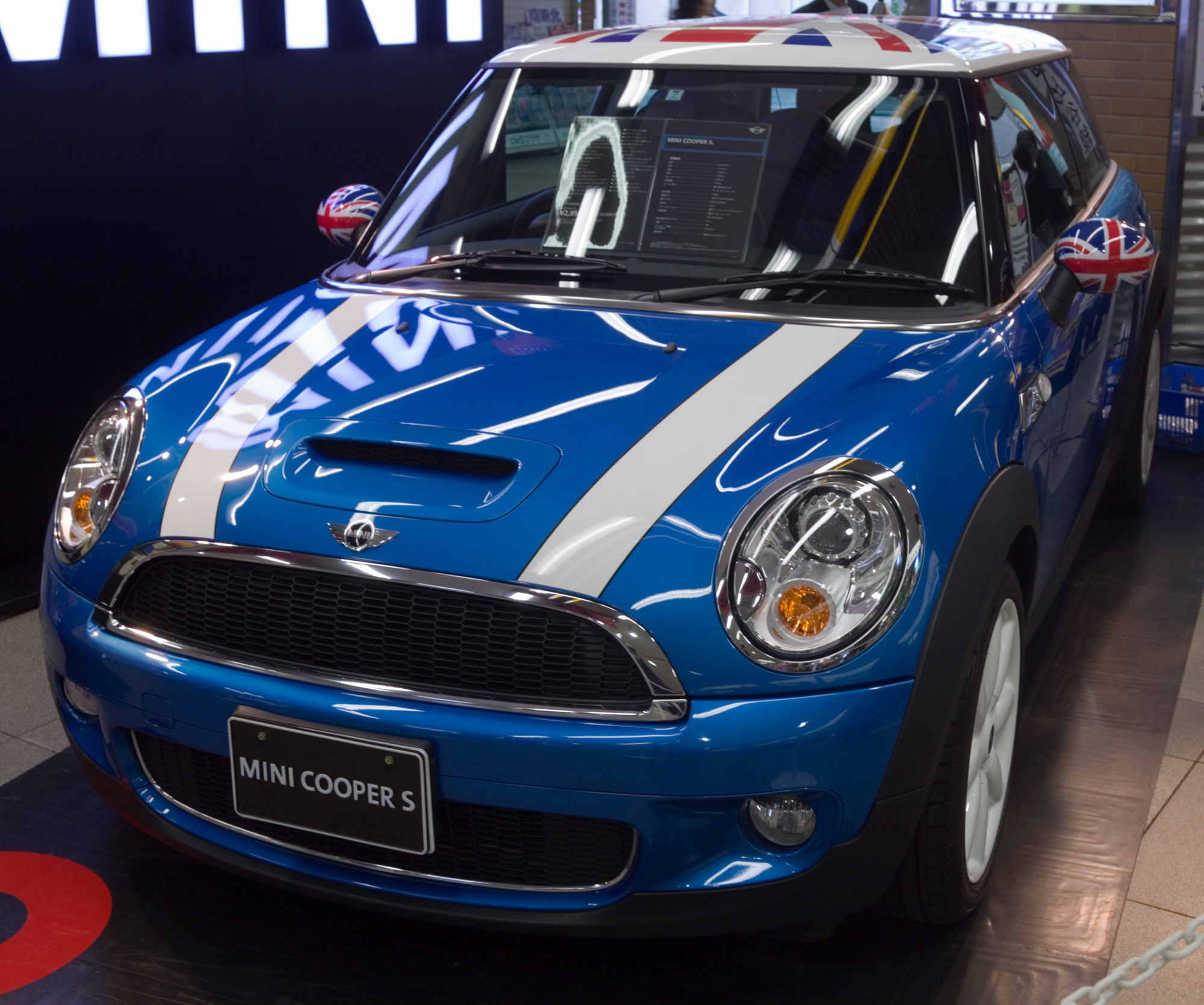
Mini Cooper S with Union Jack paintwork design

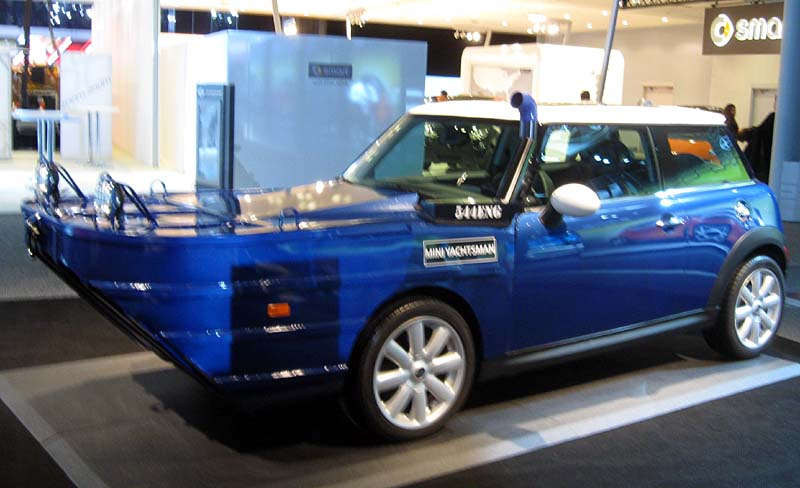
An April Fool's joke of the Mini Cooper, called the Yachtsman

The old tradition of producing special, limited-edition Minis was also continued with the new Mini. For example, the Mini Monte Carlo, is a tribute to the old Mini Cooper Monte Carlo, itself a limited edition Mini to celebrate Paddy Hopkirk's return to the Monte Carlo Rally 30 years after his original win.

Also from 2009, thermochromatic, 'chameleon'-called paints were offered in Asia and Europe.

==== Mini Inspired by Goodwood ====
In 2012, Mini and Rolls-Royce made a special edition called the Mini Inspired by Goodwood, which featured Diamond Black paintwork, and Burr Walnut interior trim with Cornsilk Nappa leather seats, dashboard and door cards. The gauges also featured the same typeface that is used in Rolls-Royce cars. It has a power output of 184 PS (135 kW) as opposed to the 174 PS (128 kW) of the regular Cooper S. It is the only special edition based on the Mini Cooper S to not have a bonnet scoop. It was the most expensive R56 Mini special edition made, at £41,000 ($52,000) new.

==== Mini 50 Camden and Mayfair ====
In 2009, the Mini 50 range was introduced at Mini United, an event marking the 50th anniversary of the launch of the original Mini. This range included the Mini 50 Camden and the Mini 50 Mayfair.

The Mini 50 Camden featured White Silver paint, White Shield wheels, a grille badge with the special Mini 50 logo, and other differentiating details, like side scuttles, which had the word Camden on them. Exclusive to the Camden was a feature called Mission Control, which was a system where three characters would talk to the occupants of the car.

The Mini 50 Mayfair had Hot Chocolate paint; while it was also offered in Pepper White or Midnight Black, Hot Chocolate was the most popular option. It also featured "Toffee" stripes, spotlights on the grille as standard, Infinity Stream Spoke wheels, and a Mini 50 grille badge, much like the Camden. The interior was finished in Toffee, the same colour as the stripes, but lacked the Mission Control feature present on the Camden. Both the 50 Mayfair and 50 Camden were offered on the Cooper, Cooper S, and Cooper D, as Mini sold them as an option package rather than separate limited editions.

==== Mini Baker Street ====
Mini released several limited editions named after streets or areas in London, with some only offered on the R55 (first generation Clubman), and some only offered on the R56. The Mini Baker Street had Rooftop Grey paint (which was later added as a stock paint option on the third-generation F56), although buyers could opt for Pepper White or Midnight Black, black bonnet stripes, Rooftop Grey interior trim, Baker Street details (dashboard, side scuttles, seat tags, and door sills) and a blacked-out version of the stock 6-Star Twin Spokes offered on the regular R56. The Baker Street was offered as a One, One D, Cooper, and Cooper D, with no Cooper S option.

==== Mini Bayswater ====
Another limited edition Mini named after an area in London was the Mini Bayswater, which featured Kite Blue paint, and in some rare instances, Midnight Black or Eclipse Grey. It also featured exclusive bonnet stripes and wing mirror caps, "Sandblast Tuned" wheels, and, much like its sister car, the Baker Street, a different dashboard, door sills, side scuttles, and seat tags. The interior was finished in Carbon Black, with two-tone stitching in the same colours as the stripes and mirror caps, Sport Blue and Jetstream Grey. It was offered as a Cooper, Cooper D, Cooper S, or Cooper SD, with no One or One D option, unlike the Baker Street.

==== Mini Green Park ====
One of the rarer limited editions was the Mini Green Park, finished in Pepper White, with British Racing Green pinstripes on the bonnet and doors, and British Racing Green mirror caps and roof. It also featured a two-tone leather dashboard, with Polar Beige and Carbon Black. Unlike the majority of limited editions, the Mini Green Park did not feature exclusive side scuttles or door sills; it used the regular side scuttles and door sills from the stock R56.

==== Mini Earl Grey ====
Exclusive to Europe and the UK was the Mini Earl Grey, a limited edition named after Earl Grey tea. It featured Dark Silver paint, with black stripes down the side of the car. The interior was finished in Carbon Black leather, with Piano Black dashboard trim. It was exclusive to the One, One D, Cooper, and Cooper D, with no Cooper S variant.

==== London 2012 Olympic games ====
At the London 2012 Olympic Games, a set of quarter scale remote-controlled Minis delivered throwing equipment, loaded into the car through the sunroof, to the athletes.

In commemoration of Mini being an official partner of Team GB, an Olympic-themed special limited edition Mini Cooper was released, with a white roof featuring the London 2012 Olympic logo, which was also on the side scuttles, the London skyline printed on the dash, and a Union Jack rim on the seats. These were exclusive to the UK, with only 2012 units made.

== Third generation (F55/56/57; 2013) ==
Third generation
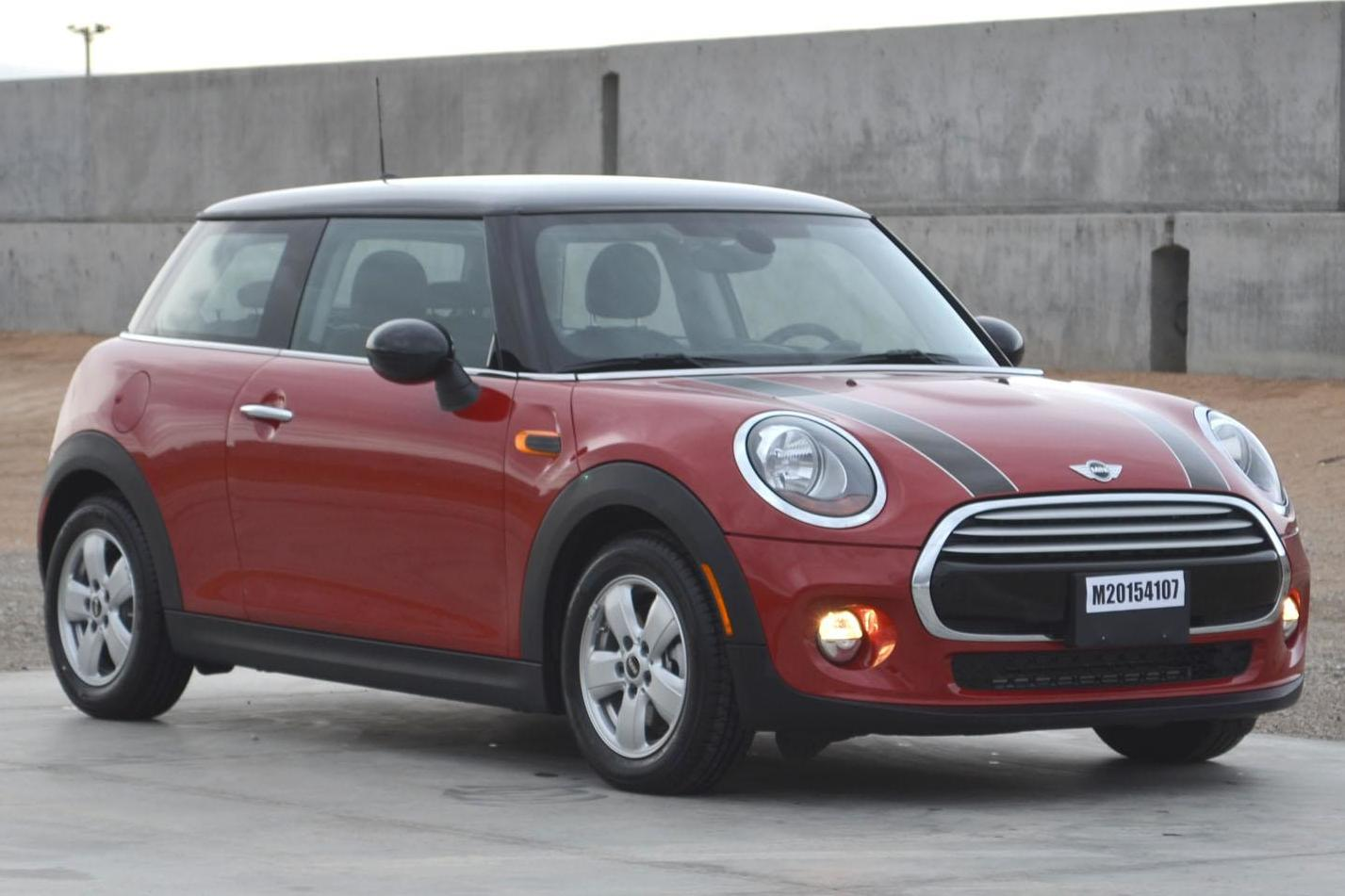
- 2015 Mini Cooper 3-door hatchback

Overview
- Model code: F55 (5-door); F56 (3-door); F57 (convertible)
- Production: November 2013–2024 (Hatch); 2015–2024 (Convertible)
- Model years: 2014–2024 (North America)
- Assembly: United Kingdom: Cowley, Oxfordshire (Plant Oxford); Netherlands: Born (VDL Nedcar)
- Designer: Stefan Göppel

Body and chassis
- Body style: 3-door hatchback 5-door hatchback 2-door convertible
- Platform: BMW UKL

Powertrain
- Engine: Petrol: 1.2 L B38A12 Twinpower turbo I3 (One); 1.5 L B38A15 Twinpower turbo I3 (Cooper); 2.0 L B48A20 Twinpower turbo I4 (Cooper S/JCW); Diesel: 1.5 L B37C15 Twinpower turbodiesel I3 (One D, Cooper D); 2.0 L B47D20 Twinpower turbo I4 (Cooper SD)
- Electric motor: 135 kW (181 hp) Synchronous Electric Motor (Cooper SE)
- Transmission: 6-speed manual; 6-speed Steptronic automatic; 8-speed Steptronic automatic; 7-speed DCT; 1-speed automatic with single-stage configuration and integrated differential (Cooper SE)

Dimensions
- Wheelbase: 2,495 mm (98.2 in); 2,567 mm (101.1 in) (5-door)
- Length: 3,821 mm (150.4 in); 3,982 mm (156.8 in) (5-door)
- Width: 1,727 mm (68.0 in)
- Height: 1,414 mm (55.7 in); 1,425 mm (56.1 in) (5-door)
- Kerb weight: 1,160–1,295 kg (2,557–2,855 lb)

Chronology
- Predecessor: Mini Coupé and Roadster (F57)

The third generation Mini was unveiled by BMW in November 2013, with sales starting in the first half of 2014. The new car is 98 mm longer, 44 mm wider, and 7 mm taller than the outgoing model, with a 28 mm longer wheelbase and increases in track width of +42 mm (front) and +34 mm (rear). The increase in size results in a larger interior and a boot volume increase to 211 litres.

Six all-new engines are offered for this Mini, four petrol and two diesels: two models of a 1.2 litre three-cylinder petrol with either 75 PS or 102 PS, a 1.5 litre 3-cylinder petrol with 136 PS (BMW B38 engine), a 2.0 litre four-cylinder petrol (BMW B48 engine) that produces 192 PS for the Cooper S, and a 1.5 litre 3-cylinder diesel (BMW B37 engine) in two levels of power output: 95 PS and 116 PS (Cooper D), and a 2.0 litre turbo-diesel inline-four (BMW B47 engine) that produces 170 PS (Cooper SD). These engines are mated with a choice of either a 6-speed manual, a 6-speed automatic, or a 6-speed sports automatic gearbox.

MINI has also released an all-new model called the MINI 5-door (known as the 4-door in US, model code F55). It is marketed as a 5-door version of the new third generation Hatch. The base MINI 5-door is 6 in (152 mm) longer and 190 lb (86.2 kg) heavier than the 3-door MINI Hatch models, with similar performance characteristics and greater interior and cargo space. The 5-door is exclusively assembled at Plant Oxford with additional tooling for the body sides, new equipment in the wax sealing line in the plant's paintshop to accommodate the extra door and differences in the shaping of the rear of the car. Plant Swindon produces the new rear door cells in the sub-assembly line with additional roof and panel tooling in the press shop.

The 3-door Mini with an automatic transmission will reach 0–97 km/h (0–60 mph) in 7.3 seconds for the 1.5L 3-cylinder petrol model and in 6.4 seconds with the 2.0L 4-cylinder petrol engine.

The Cooper S soon was joined by the higher performing John Cooper Works model in 2015.

In 2018, with the Life Cycle Impulse (LCI-1), the 6-speed Steptronic torque-converter were replaced by a 7-speed dual-clutch transmission in all models but the Cooper SD and JCW, with the latter now fitted with an 8-speed Steptronic auto. These changes allow for improved efficiency and better emissions test results in the WLTP cycle, as well as marginally improved performance.

A battery-electric version, the Mini Electric (aka Cooper SE), was launched in 2020.

In 2021, the second Life Cycle Impulse (LCI-2) was released. The model received both optical and technical updates. The front and rear bumpers were redesigned, union jack taillights now came as standard as well as LED headlights. The interior updates are limited to a new steering wheel design and additional ambient lighting under dashboard trim pieces and in the door trims. The petrol-powered cars are fitted with a particle filter which led to a 10-horsepower decrease in power output for the B48-powered Cooper S.

=== Design ===
The shape is slightly more rounded than the one it replaces, in order both to improve the car's aerodynamic efficiency and to enhance pedestrian protection in the event of accidents. It has a much longer overhang and higher bonnet. This model rides on BMW's all new UKL platform that underpins the new BMW 2 Series Active Tourer.

Criticisms of the design of the F56 MINI Cooper have focused upon the extruded and complex design of the front bumper in Cooper S and JCW variants, as well as the larger front overhang and oversized tail lamps. Further criticism has also centred upon the overstyled nature of the exterior design.

The Mini is also the first in its segment to offer LED headlamps for its main and dipped beams as an option.

With its larger exterior dimensions, the all-new Mini provides more space for its four occupants and luggage, with enhanced shoulder space and larger footwells. Boot volume has been increased by more than 30% to 211 litres. When using only 2 seats in the car, boot capacity increases up to 731 litres.

The dashboard retains its instrument layout, but adds a new instrument binnacle on the steering column for the speedometer, tachometer, and fuel gauge. The central instrument display now houses a four-line TFT display with the option to upgrade to an 8.8 inch screen for navigation and infotainment functions.

=== Mini John Cooper Works GP (2020) ===
John Cooper Works GP

The third generation of the Mini John Cooper Works GP first appeared as a concept car in the IAA Cars 2017 with a track ready race-track character. The stripped-out interior included a roll cage and only a pair of racing seats (back seats were absent) with five-point racing harnesses. Outside, both front and rear wheels were covered by prominent wings (especially in the rear). A unique rear spoiler and centrelock 19" wheels were other features of the track-focused hot hatch. In June 2019, a tweet was posted showing the Nürburgring time of 07:56:69 molded into the plastic trim of the dashboard.

The actual production model was revealed in November 2019, retaining some characteristics from the concept such as a very similar rear spoiler and wings (this time smaller in the rear). The wider track and wider wheels required wider wings. Other more extreme racing features (for a street car) like the centrelock wheels and five-point harnesses were removed, although the back seats were kept absent. The suspension is even stiffer and lower than a standard JCW and the turbocharger was redesigned for more boost pressure. The transmission is automatic only because there was no manual transmission available that could withstand the power and torque from the engine. The Nürburgring time on the dashboard was replaced by the individual production number (this same number appears on the front wings).

The 2.0 litre turbocharged engine outputs 225 kW (302 hp) and 450 N⋅m (332 lb⋅ft) of torque. The 0–100 km/h is 5.2 s and the top speed is 265 km/h (165 mph) (not cut off). As of release time, the third generation of the Mini JCW GP is the fastest and most powerful street car Mini has ever produced.

Production was limited to 3,000 units, with a MSRP of $44,900 (USD).

=== Mini Superleggera Vision Concept ===
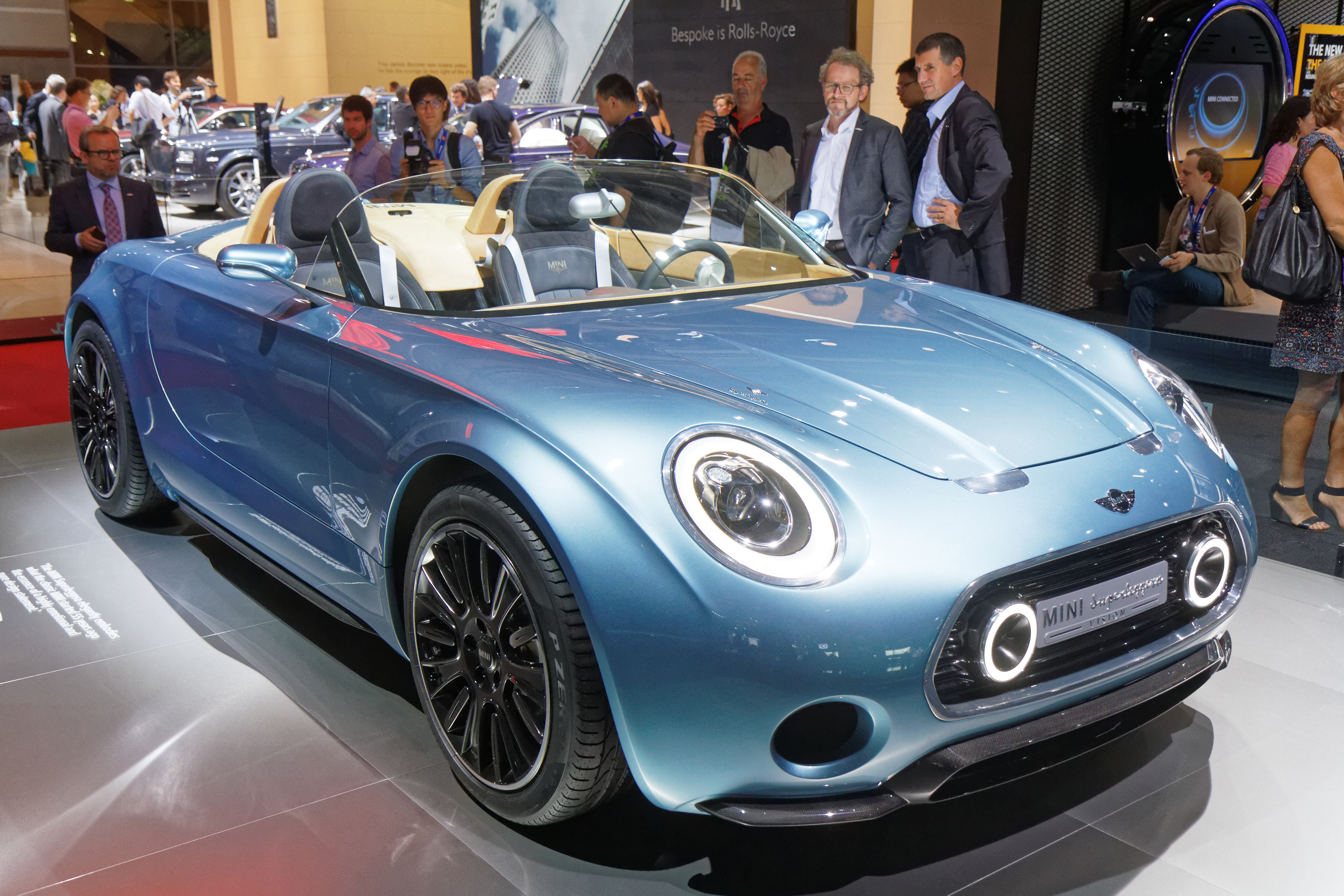
Mini Superleggera Vision Concept (Front)

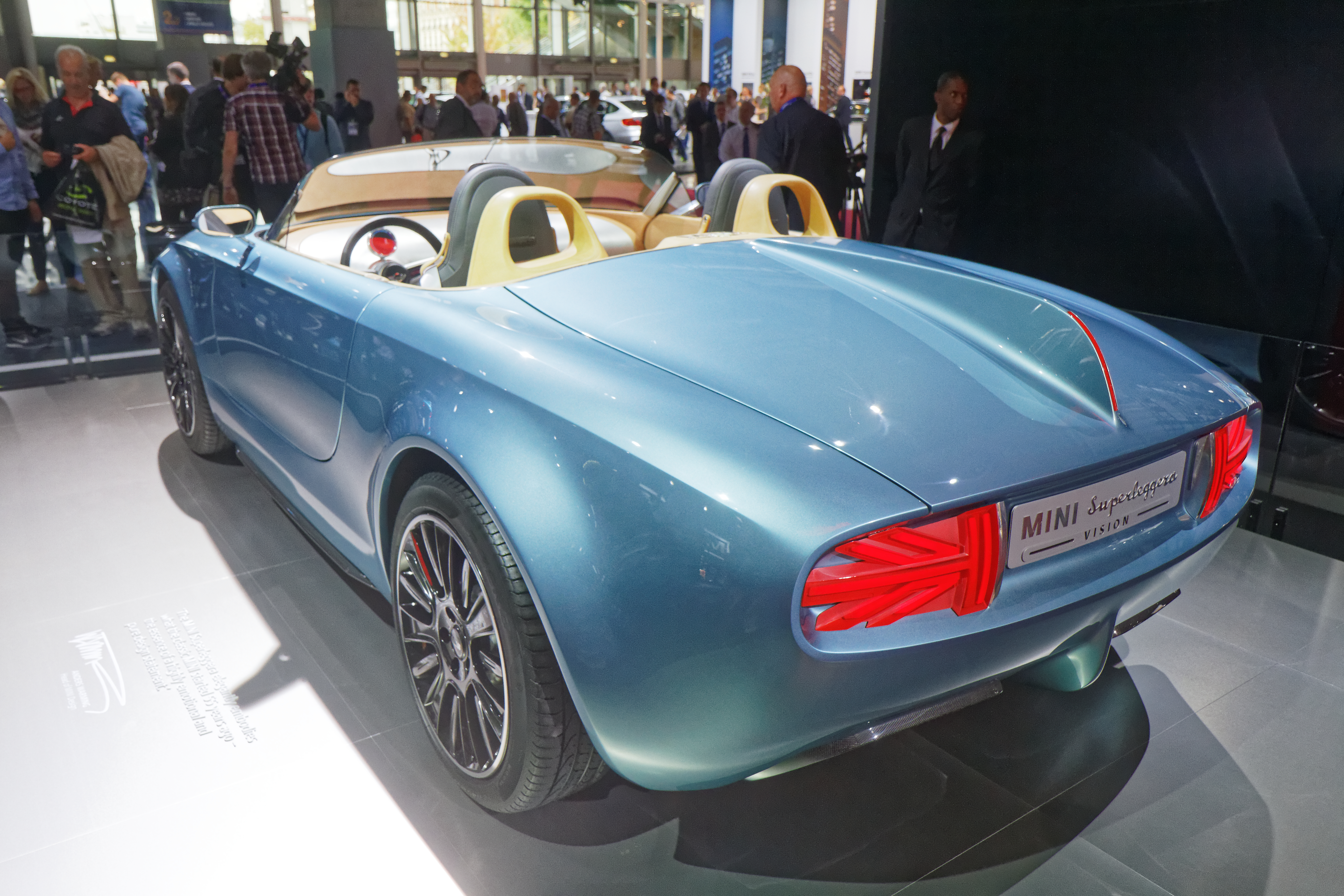
Mini Superleggera Vision Concept (Back)

In 2014 Mini revealed a Mini Superleggera Vision Concept for a possible new roadster, in collaboration with Carrozzeria Touring Superleggera at the Concorso d'Eleganza Villa d'Este.

=== Gallery ===
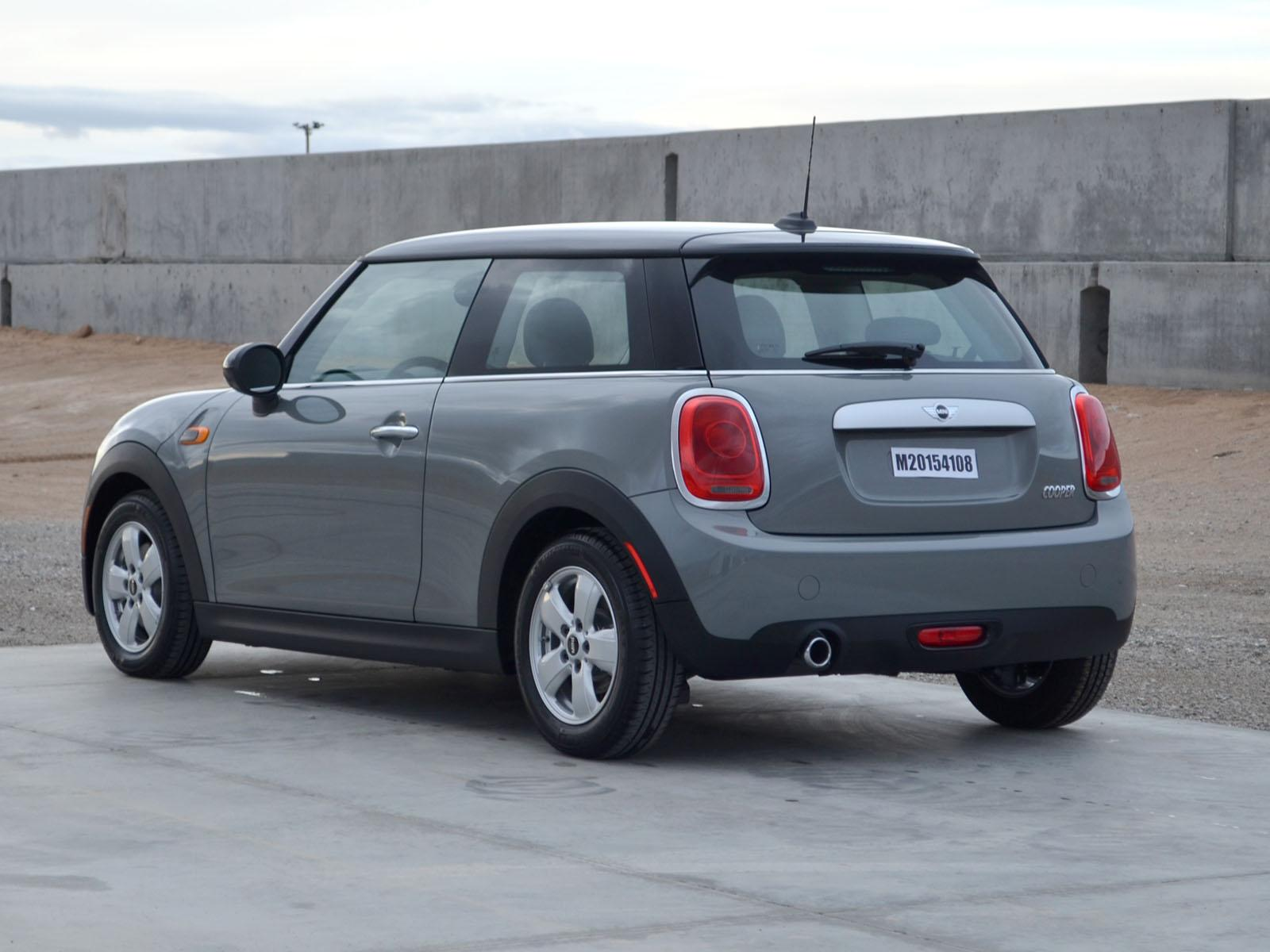
3-door hatchback (rear)

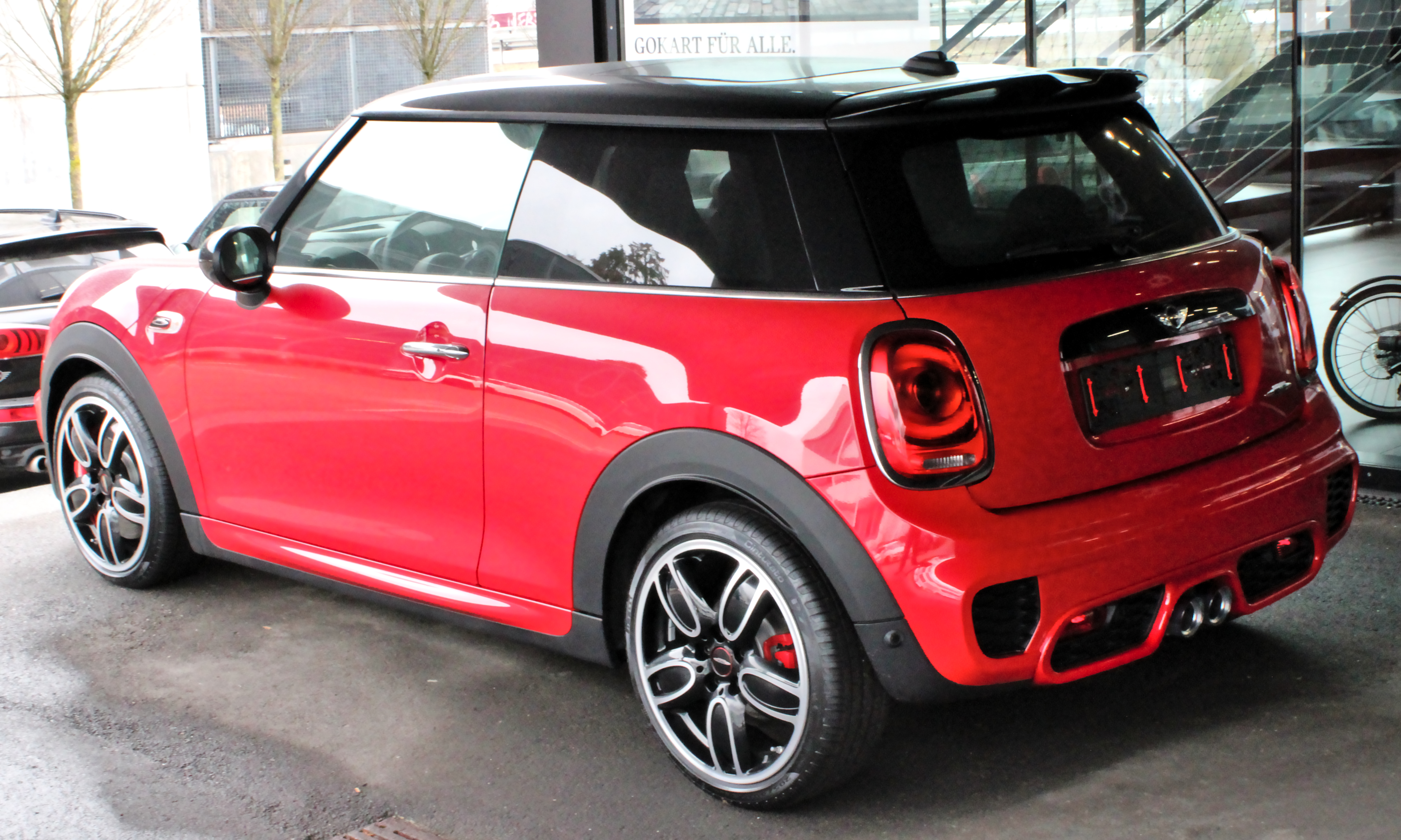
3-door hatchback John Cooper Works

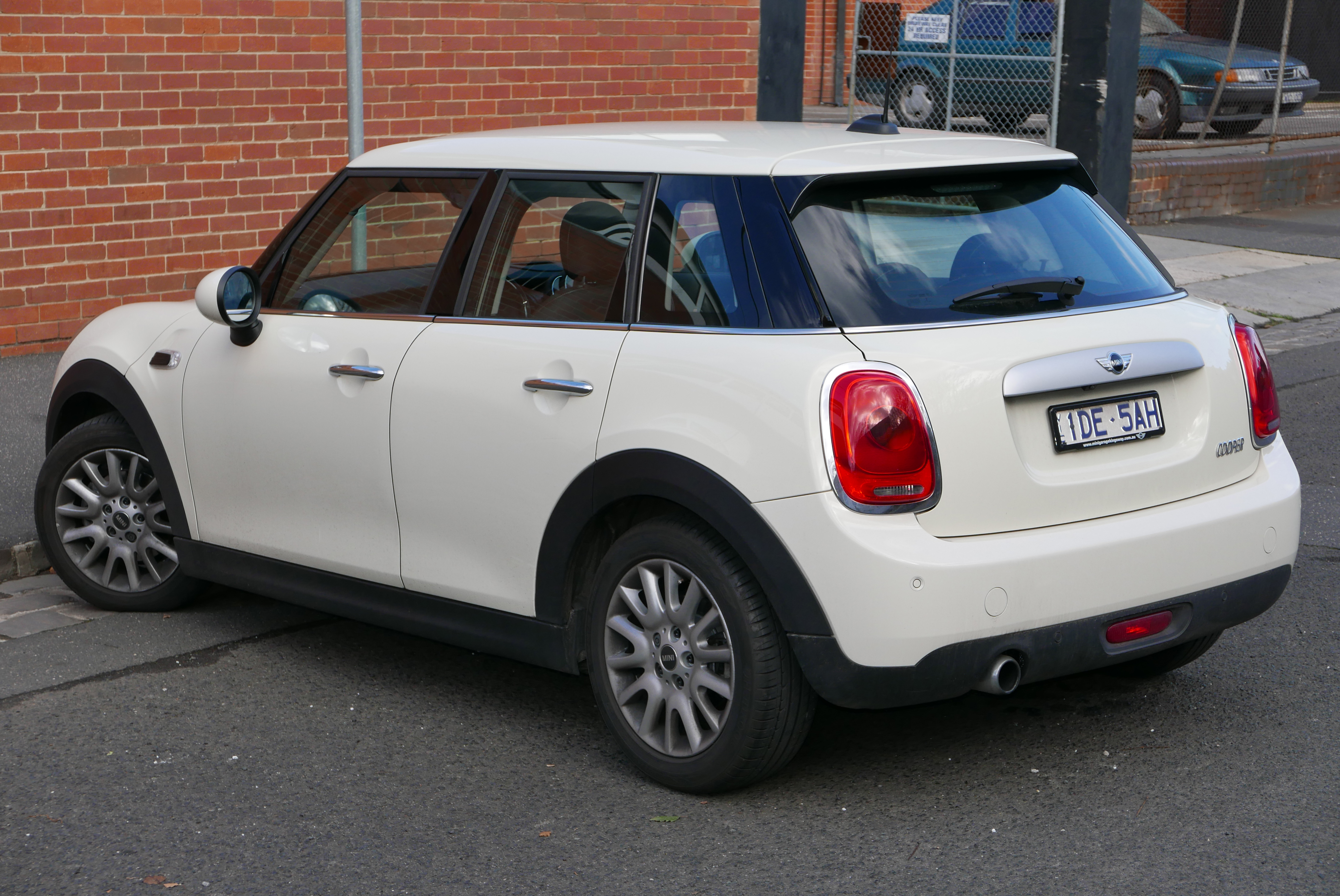
5-door hatchback

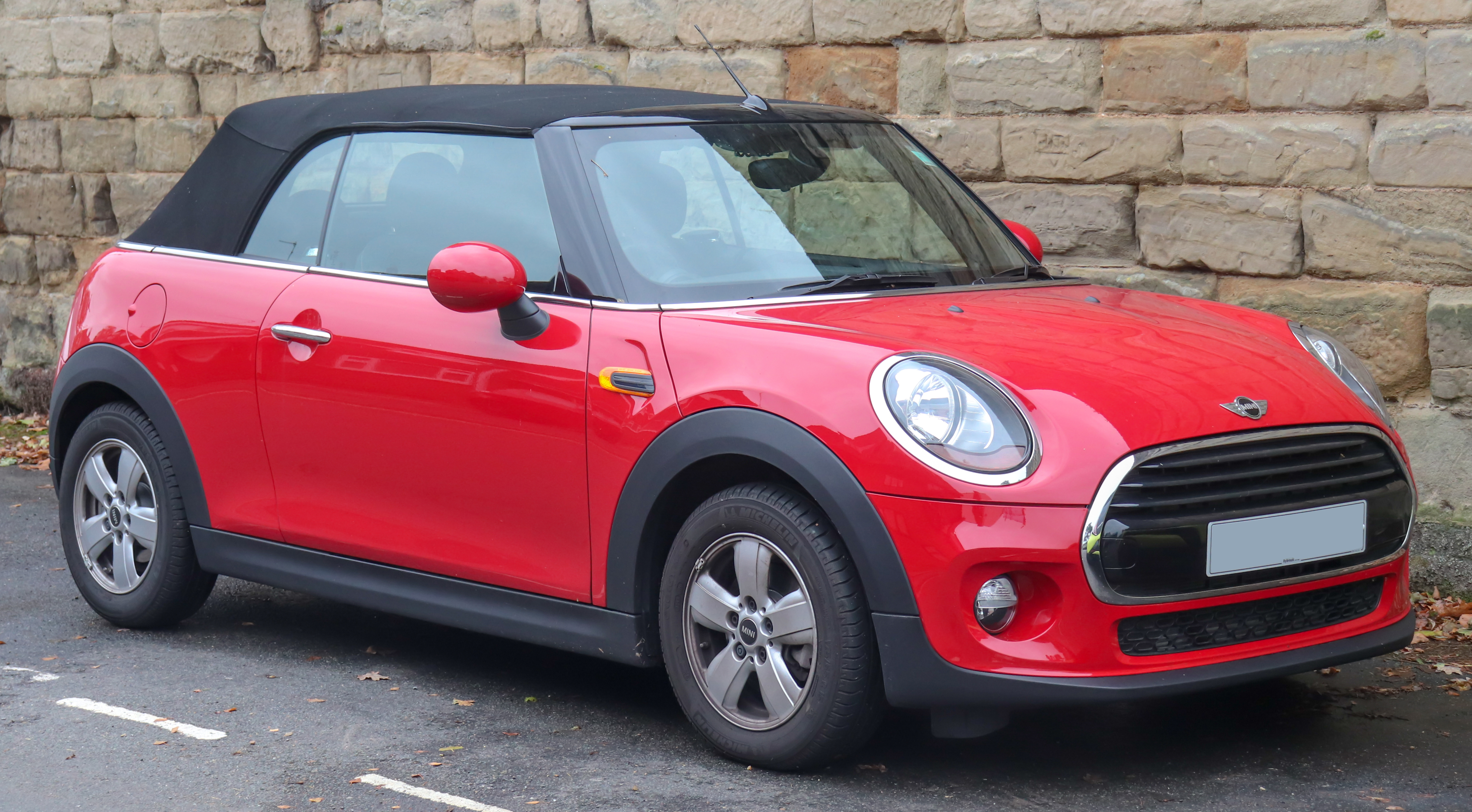
2-door convertible

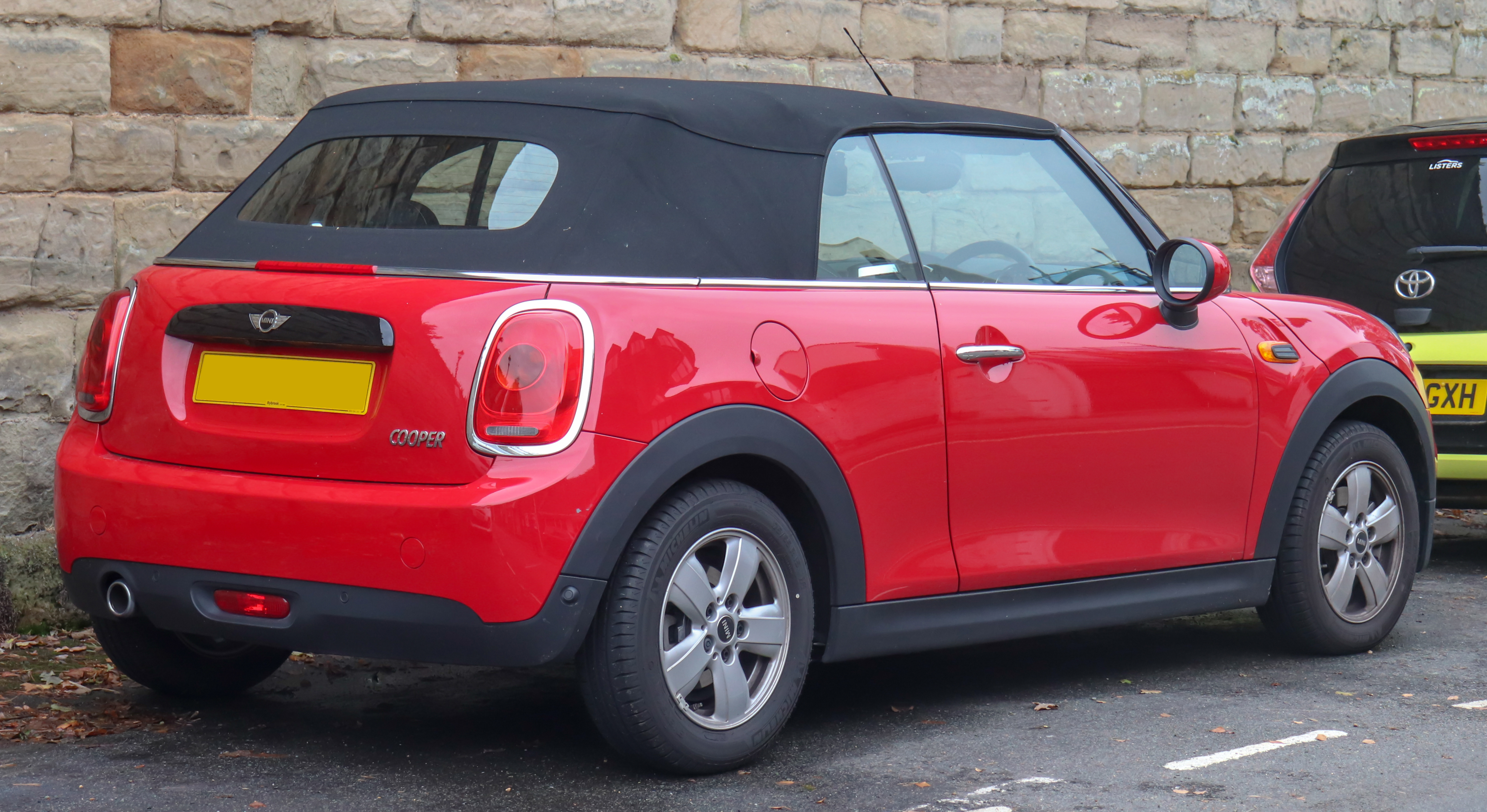
Rear view

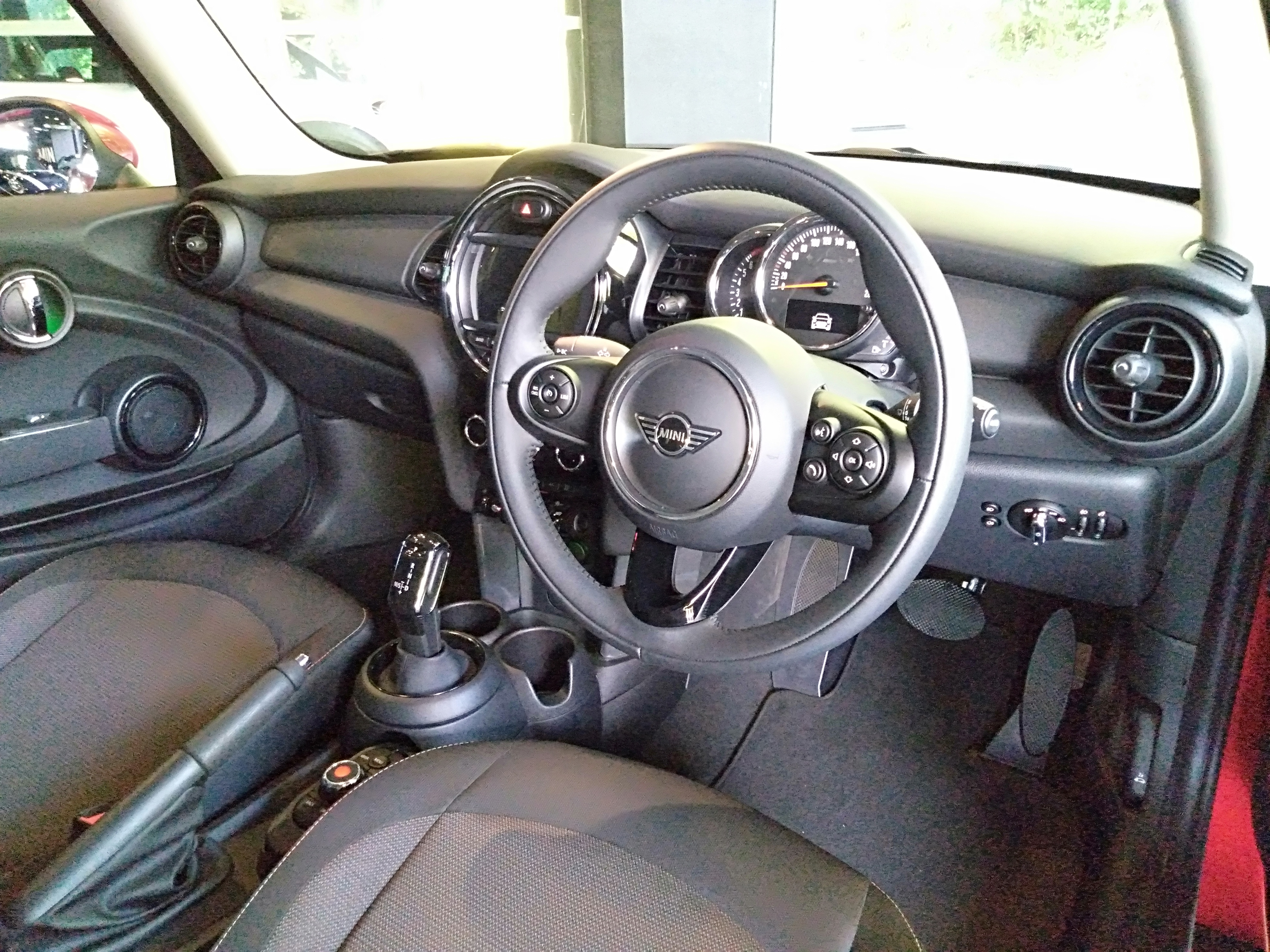
Interior (first facelift)

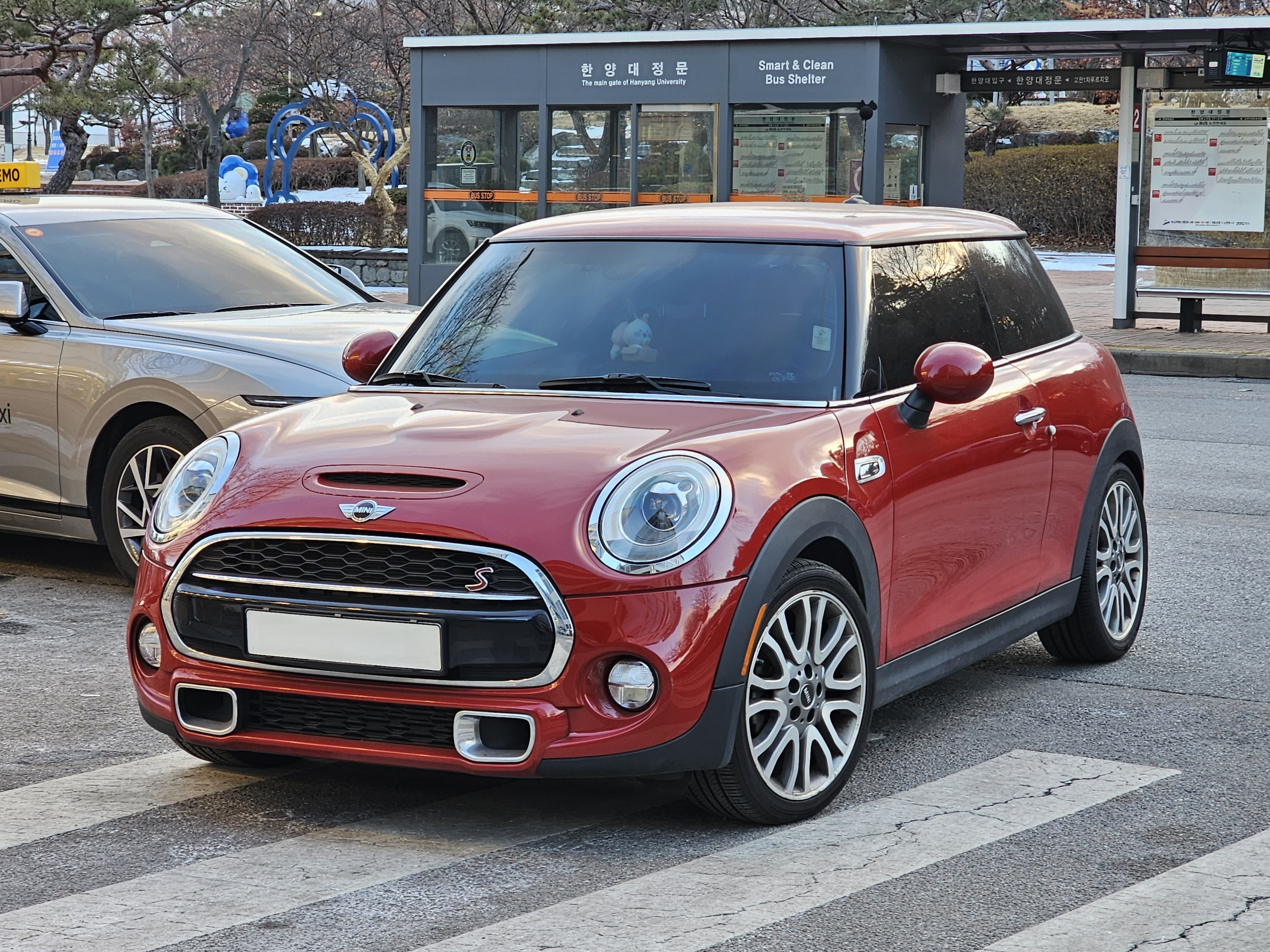
3-door hatchback (first facelift)

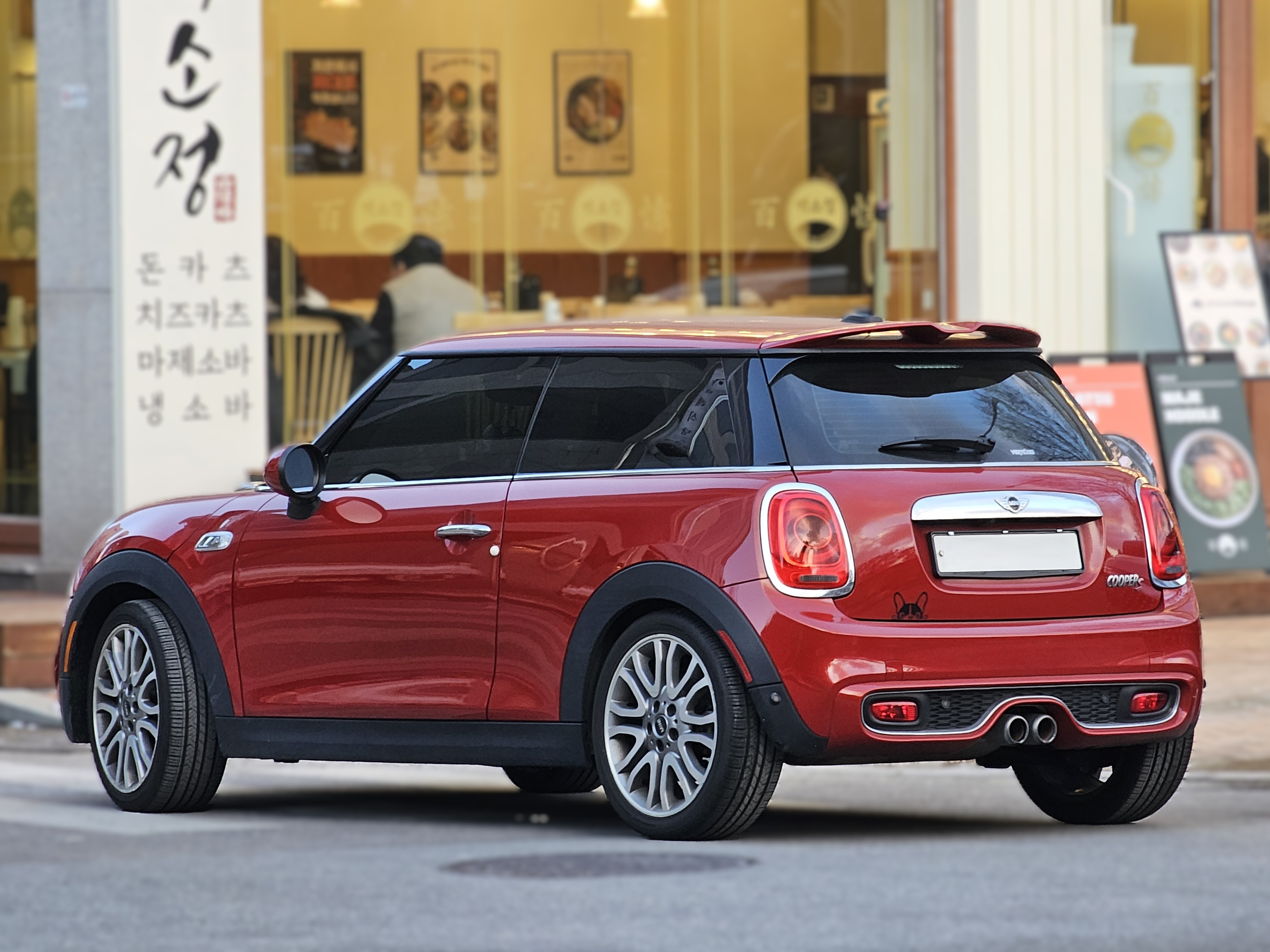
Rear view

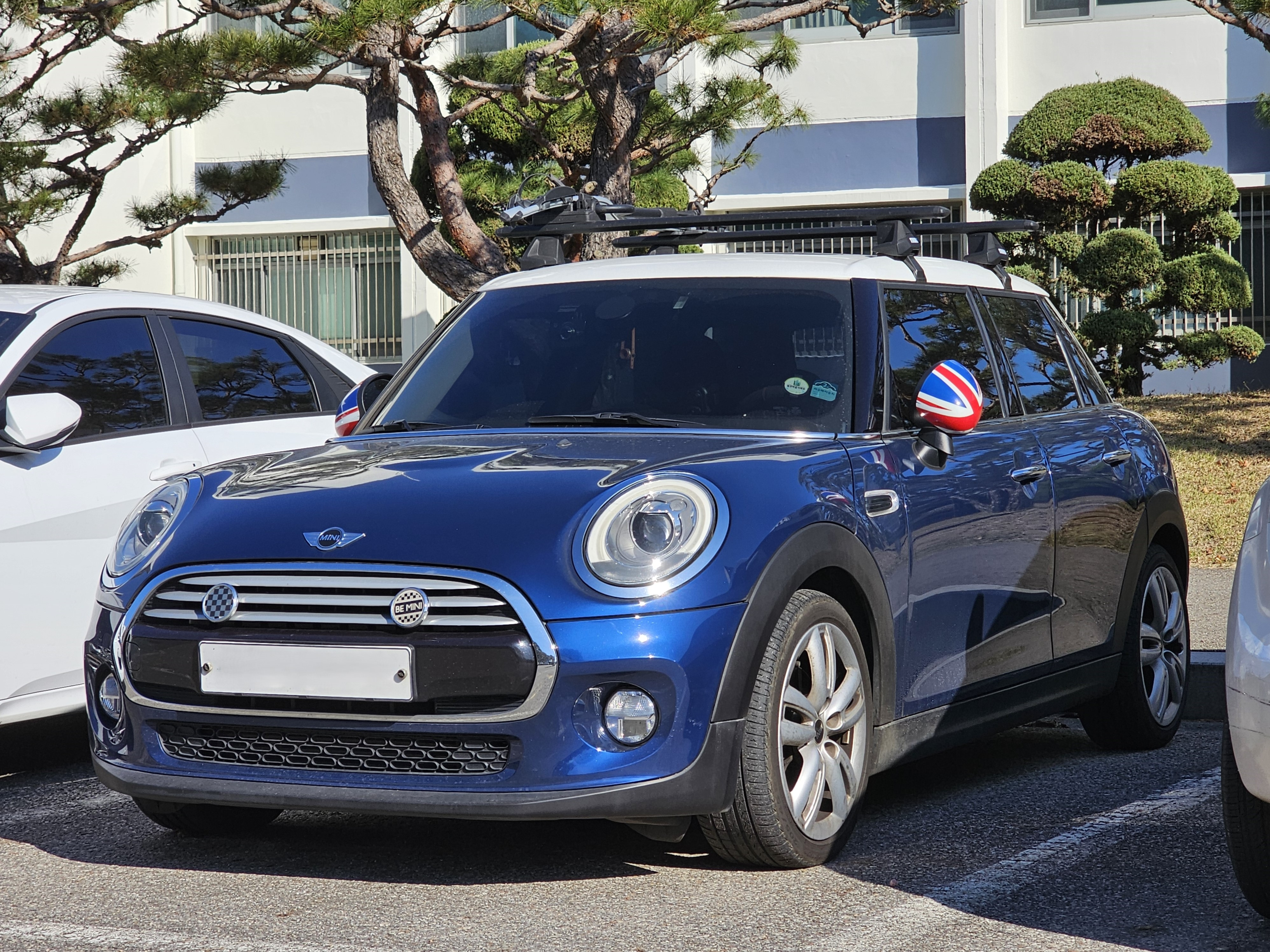
5-door hatchback (first facelift)

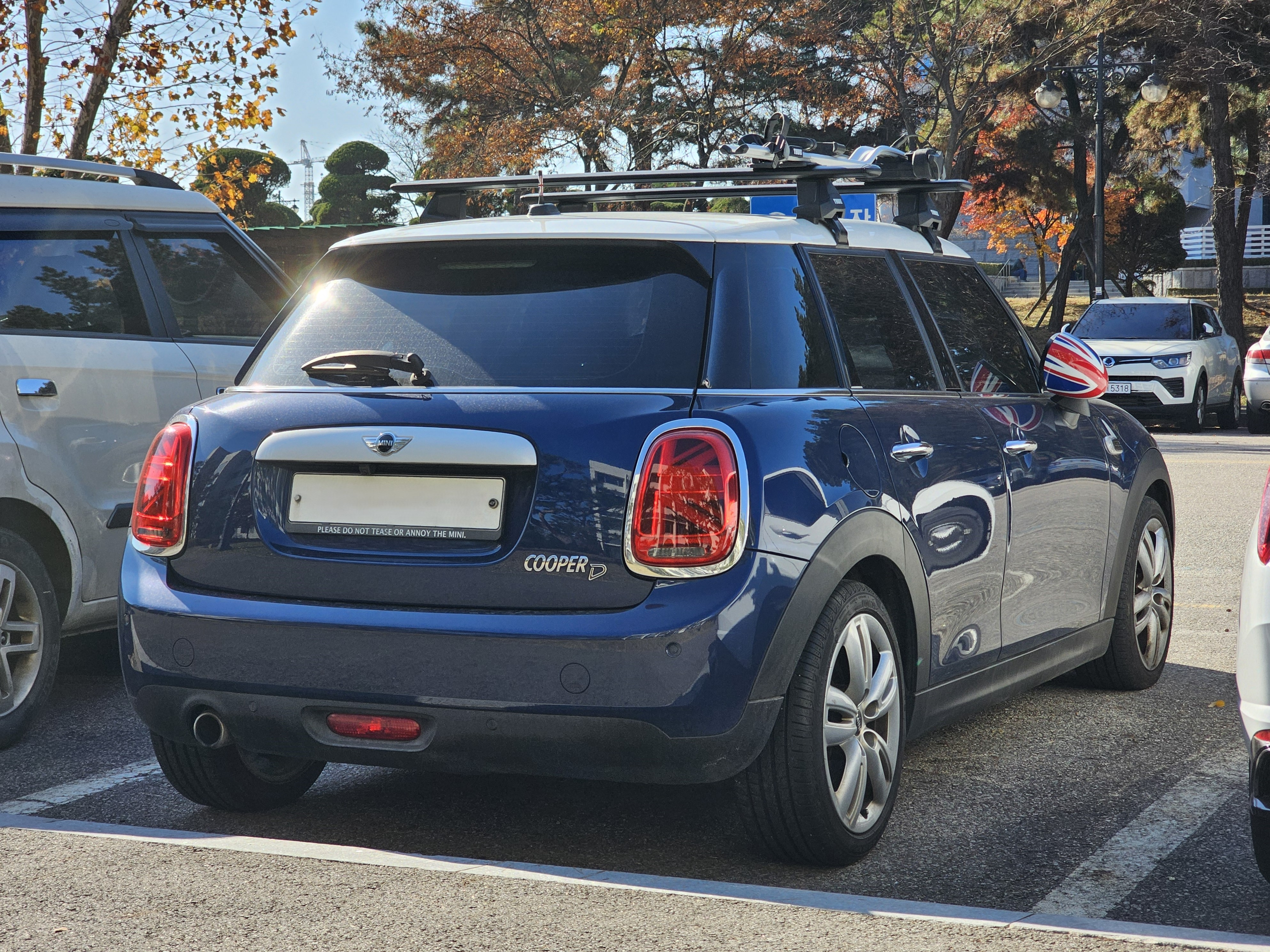
Rear view

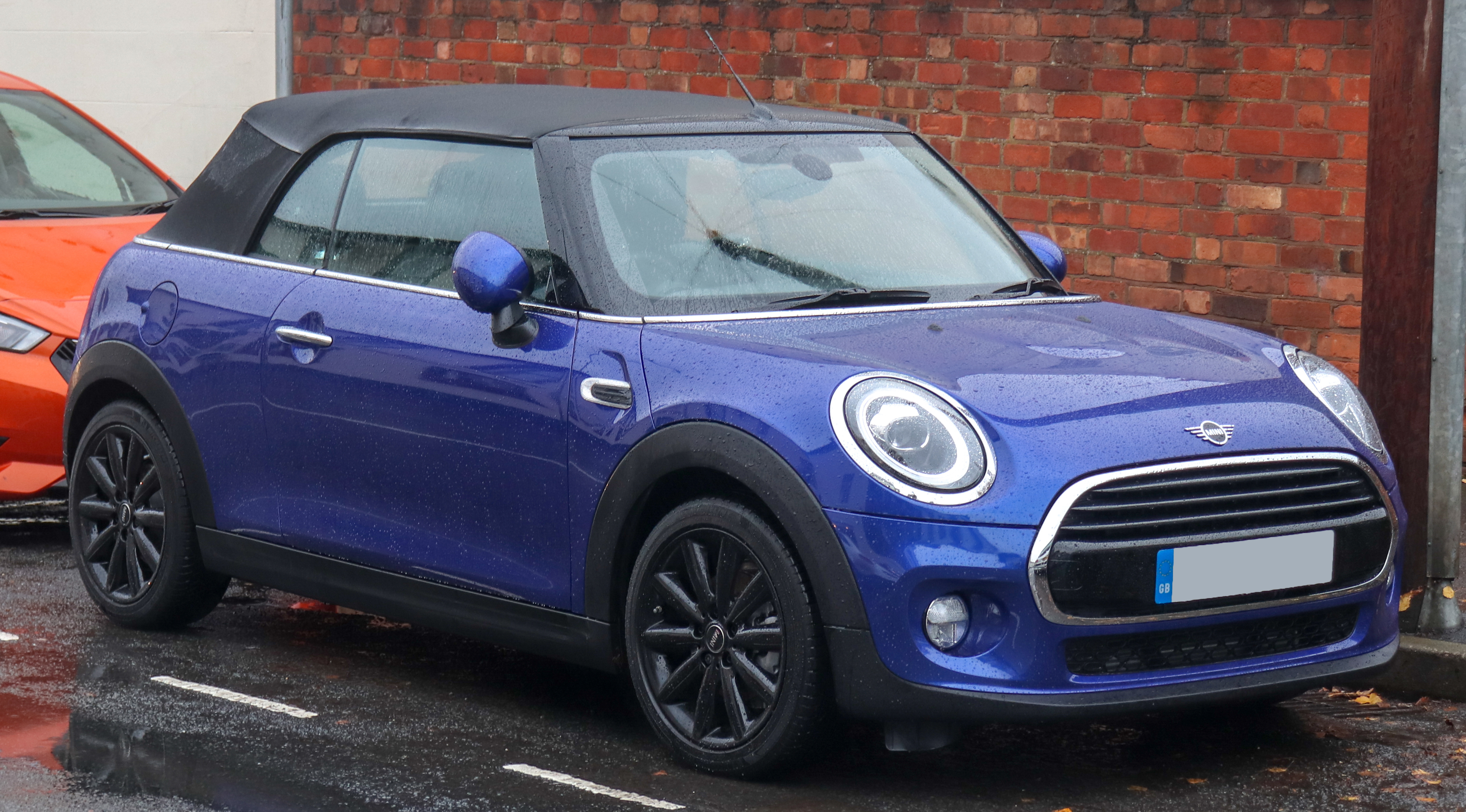
2-door convertible (first facelift)

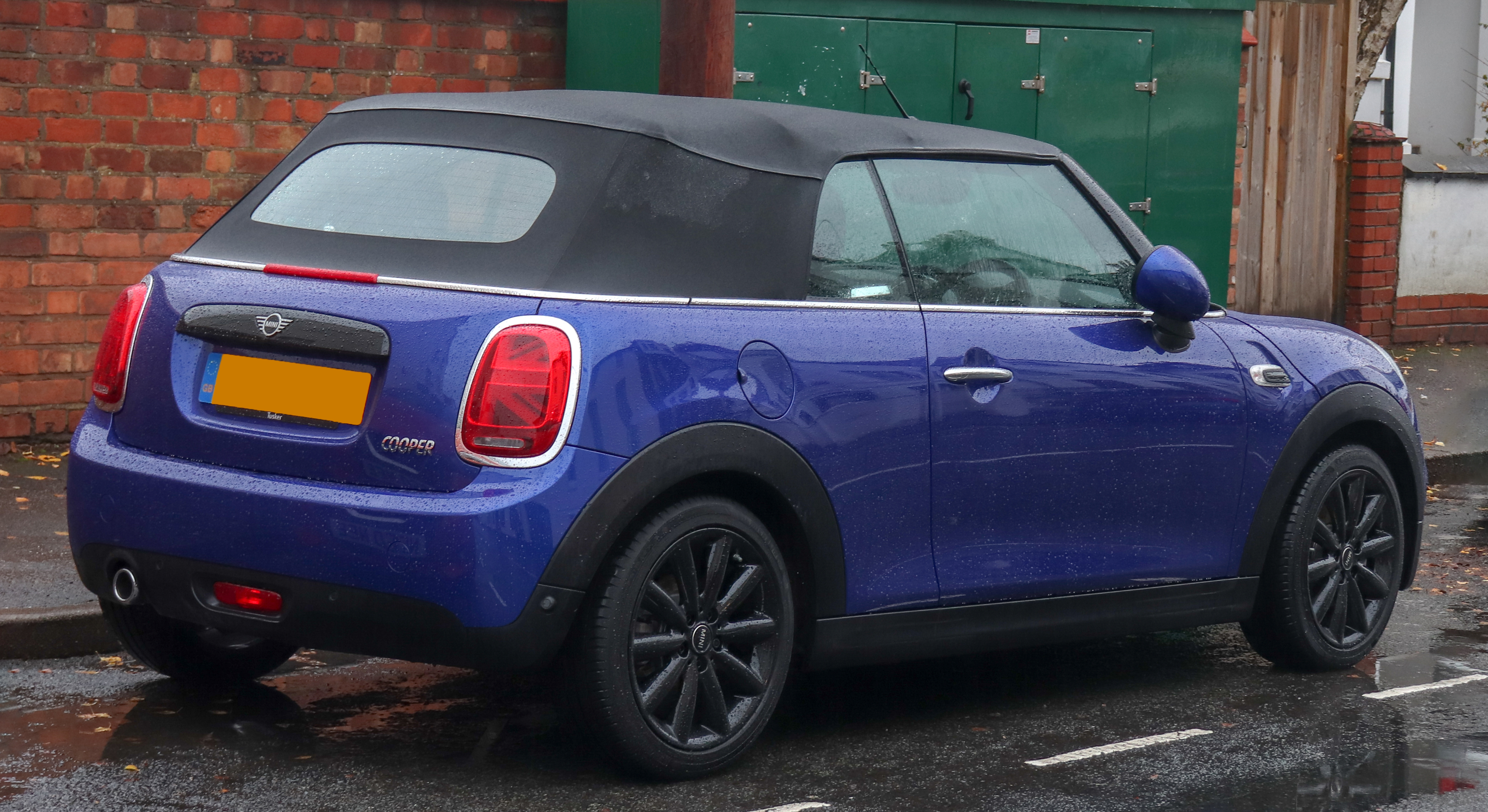
Rear view with the Union Jack rear lights

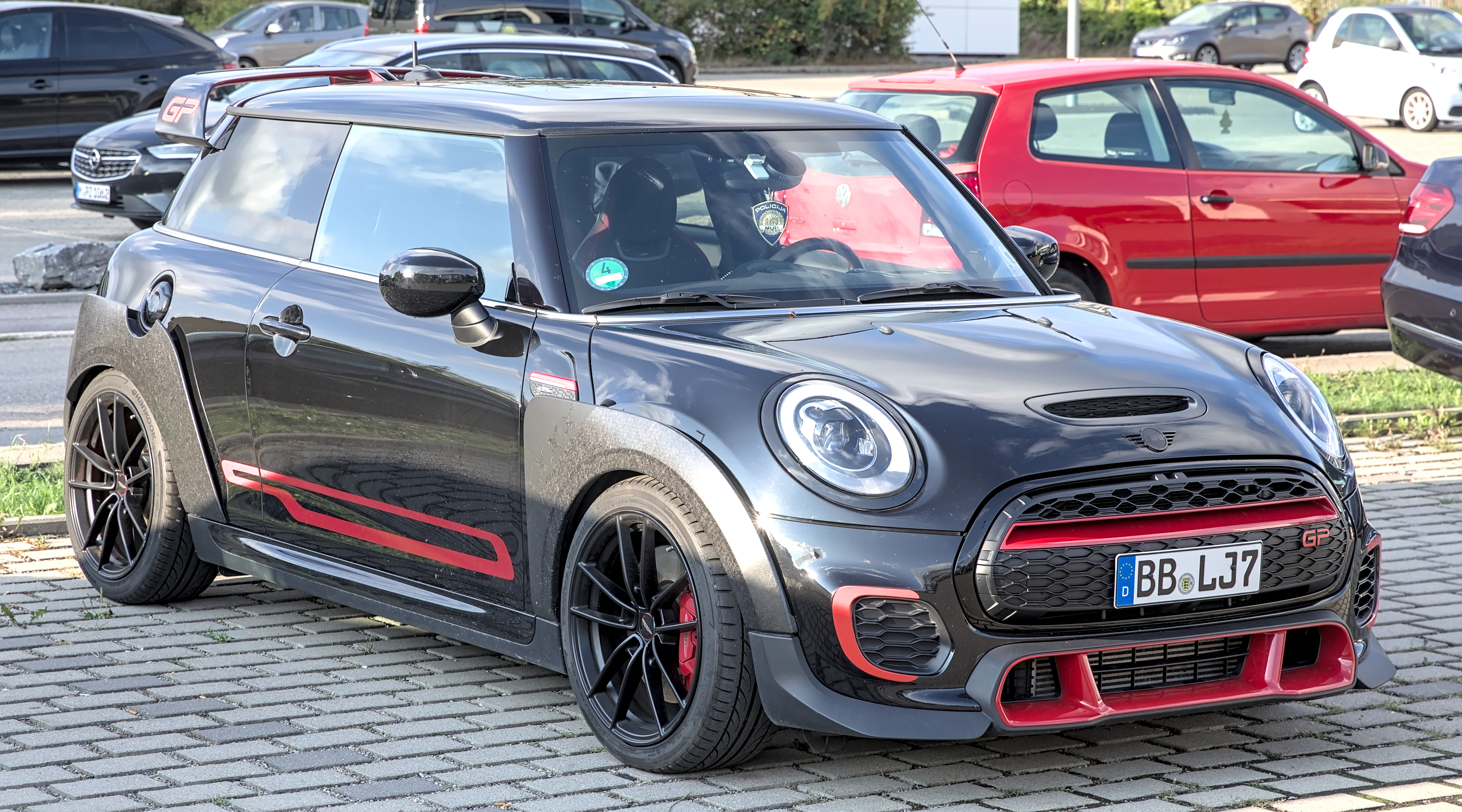
5-door hatchback John Cooper Works (first facelift)

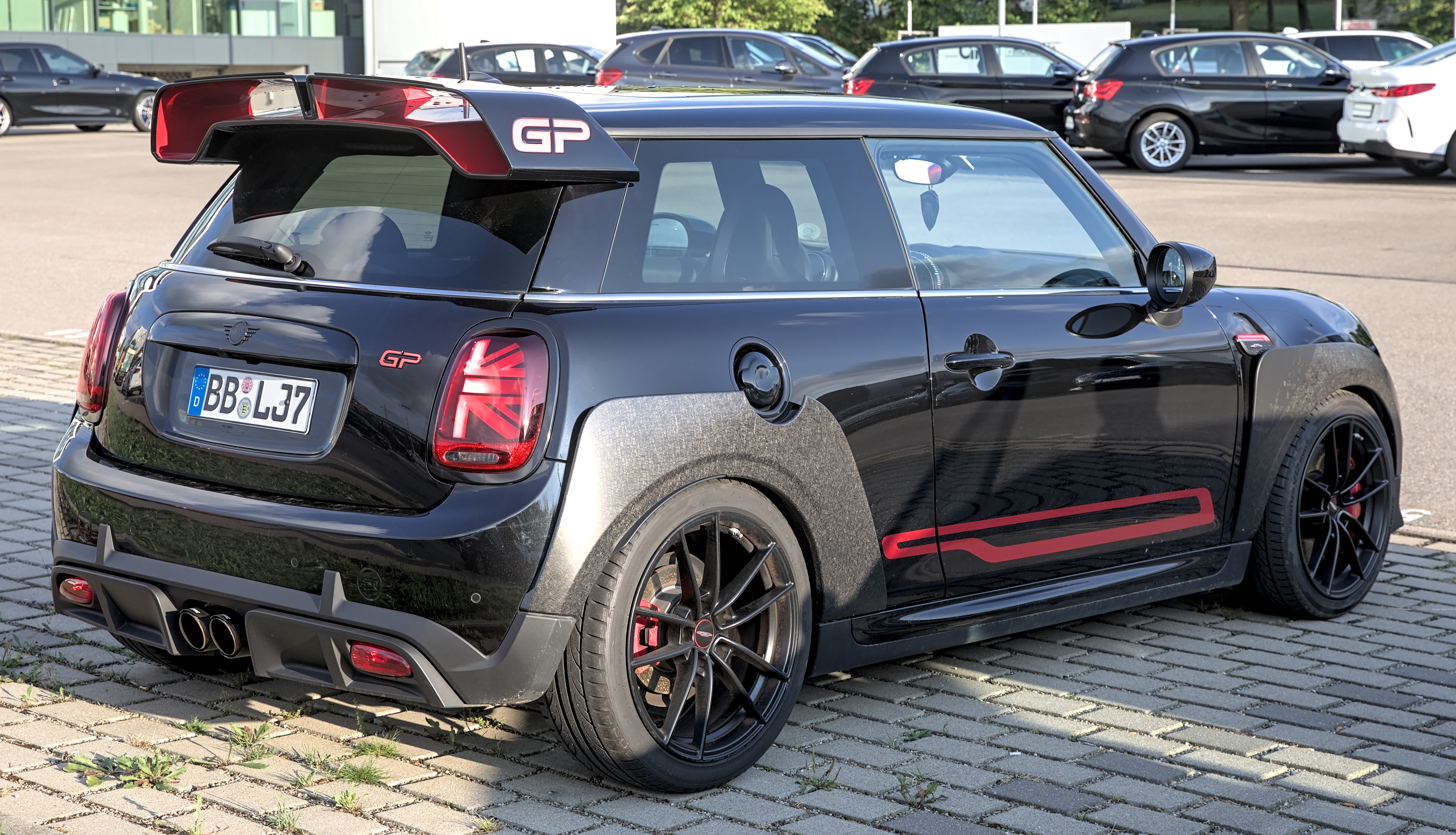
Rear view

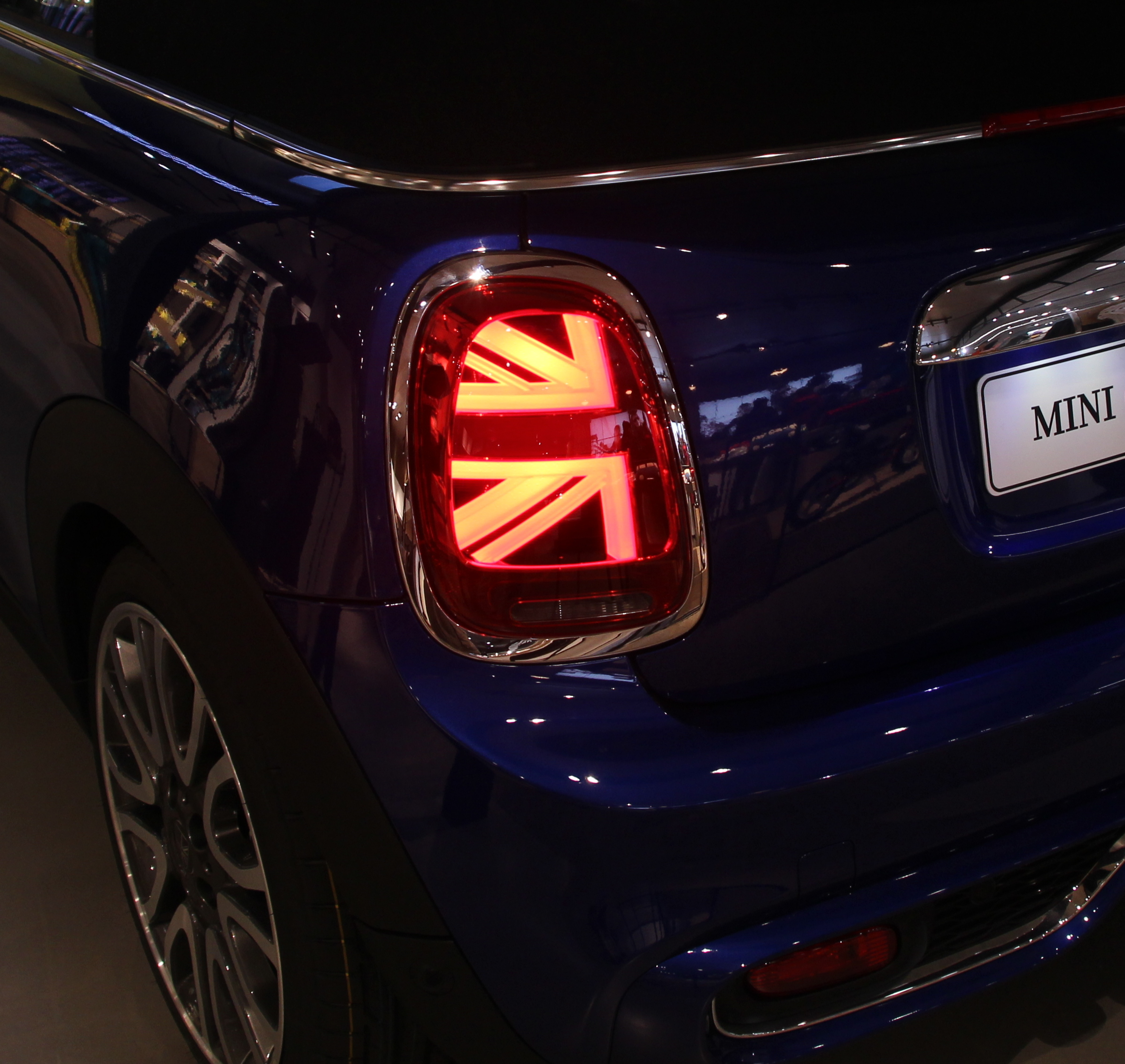
Union Jack rear lights lit-up

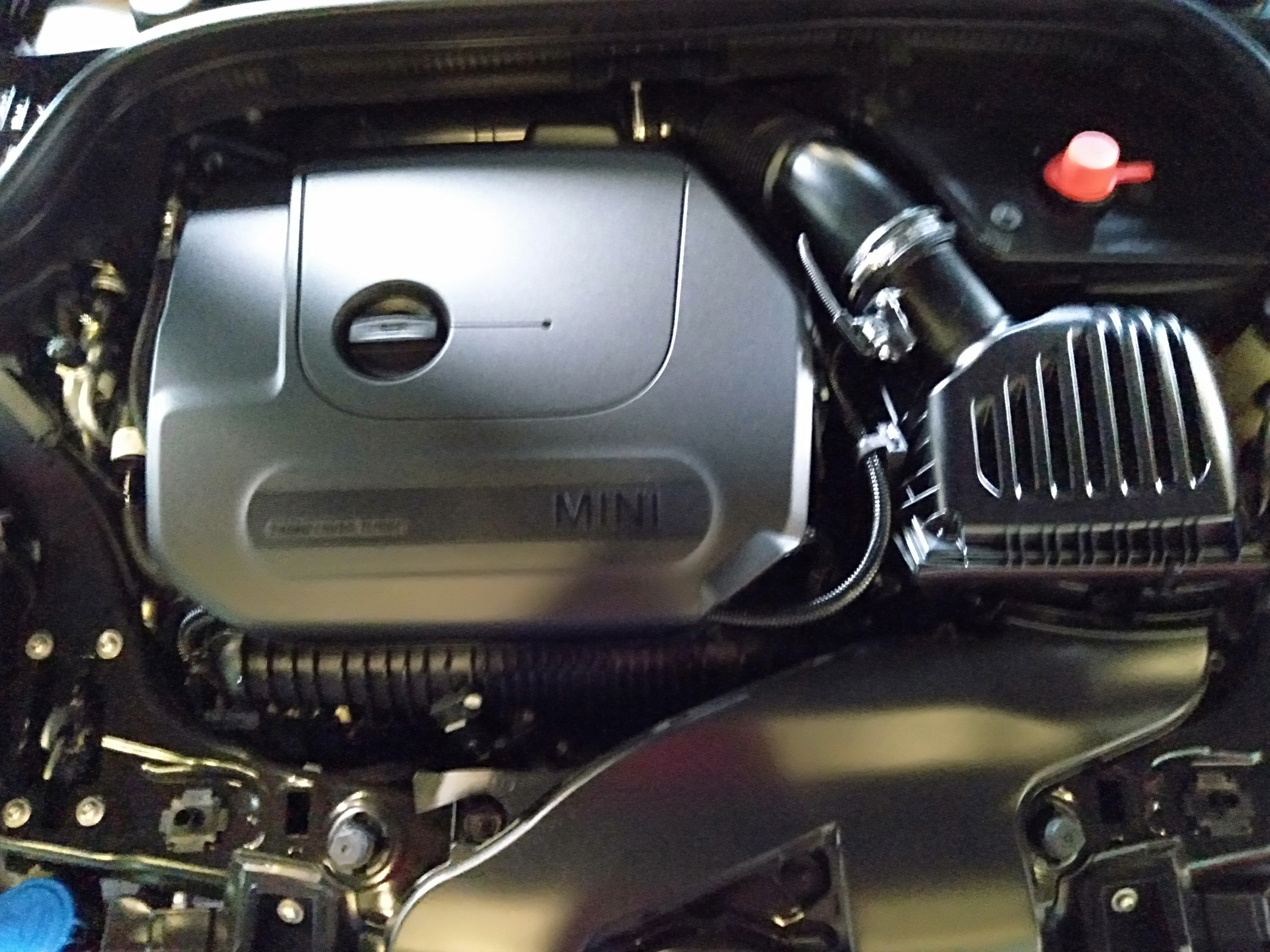
2.0L BMW B48 TwinPower Turbo petrol engine in a Mini Cooper S

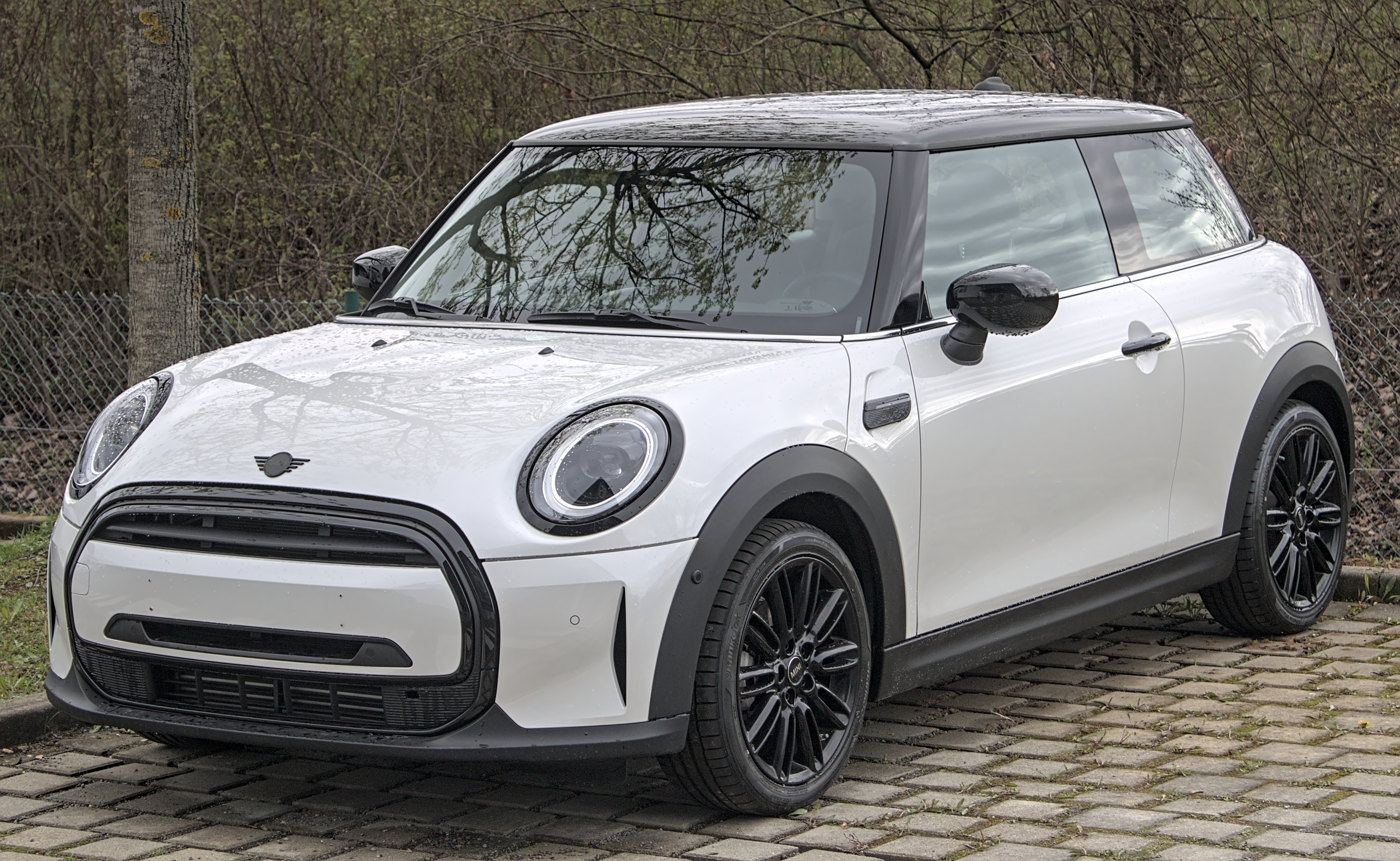
3-door hatchback (second facelift)

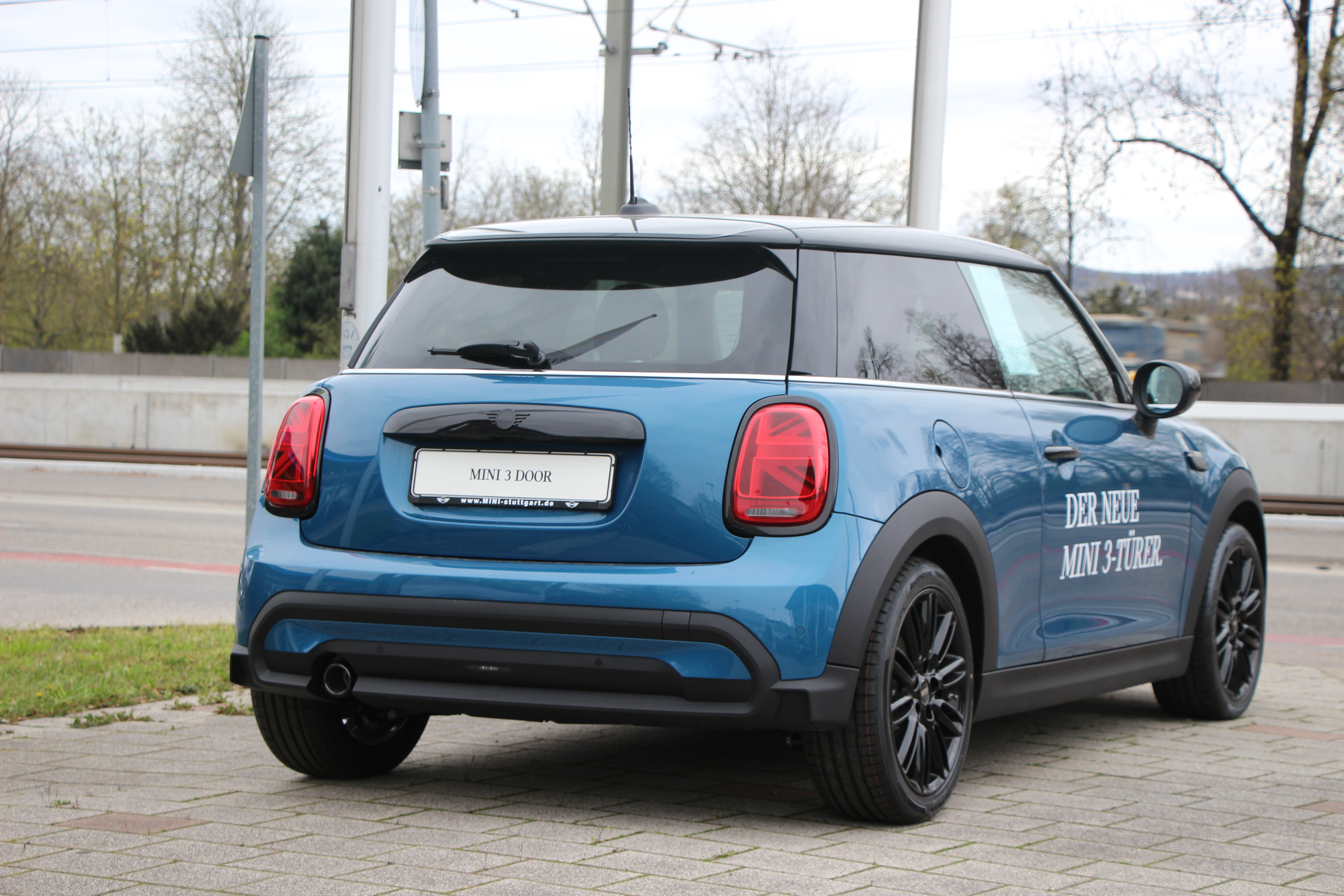
Rear view

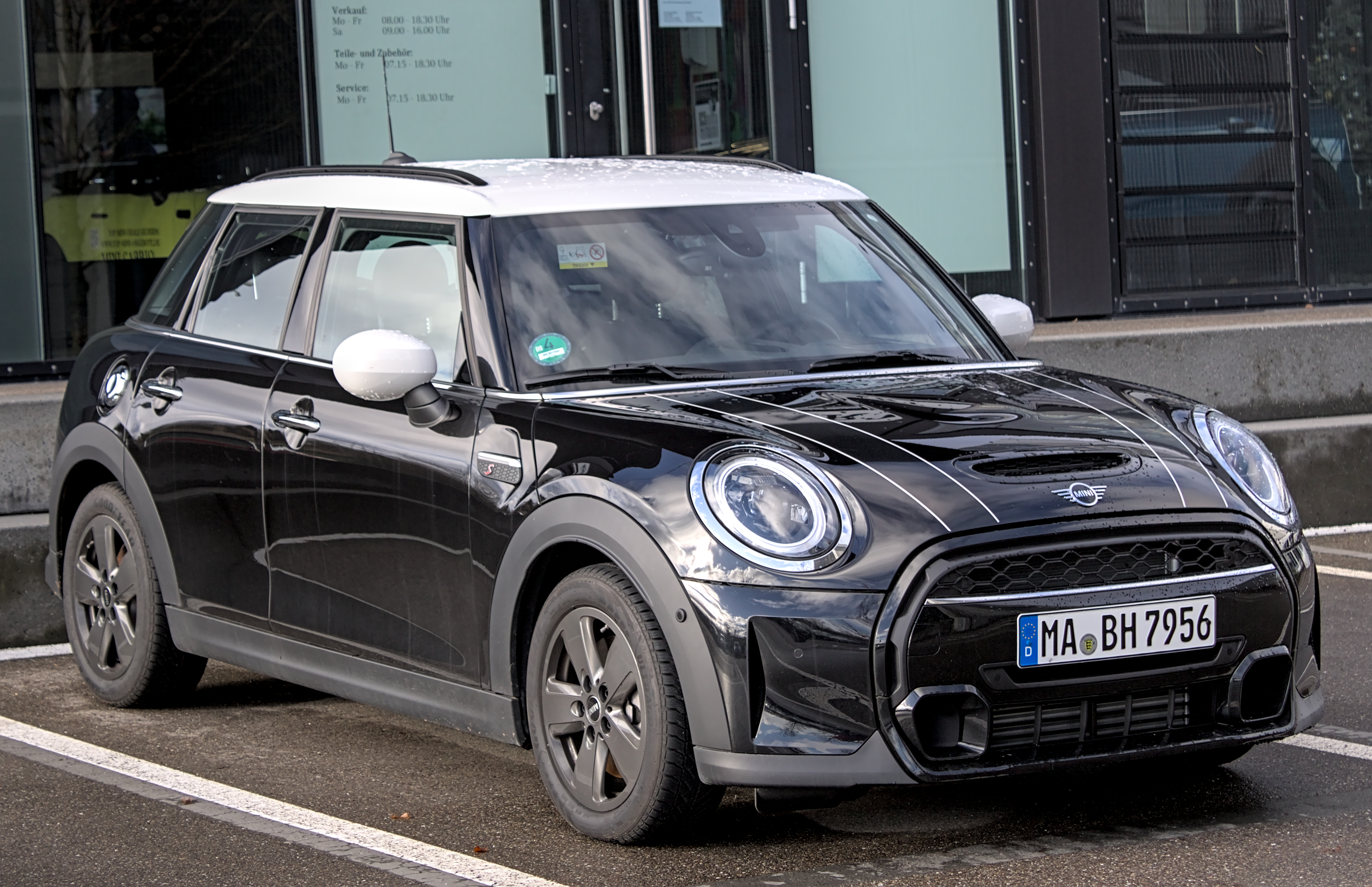
5-door hatchback (second facelift)

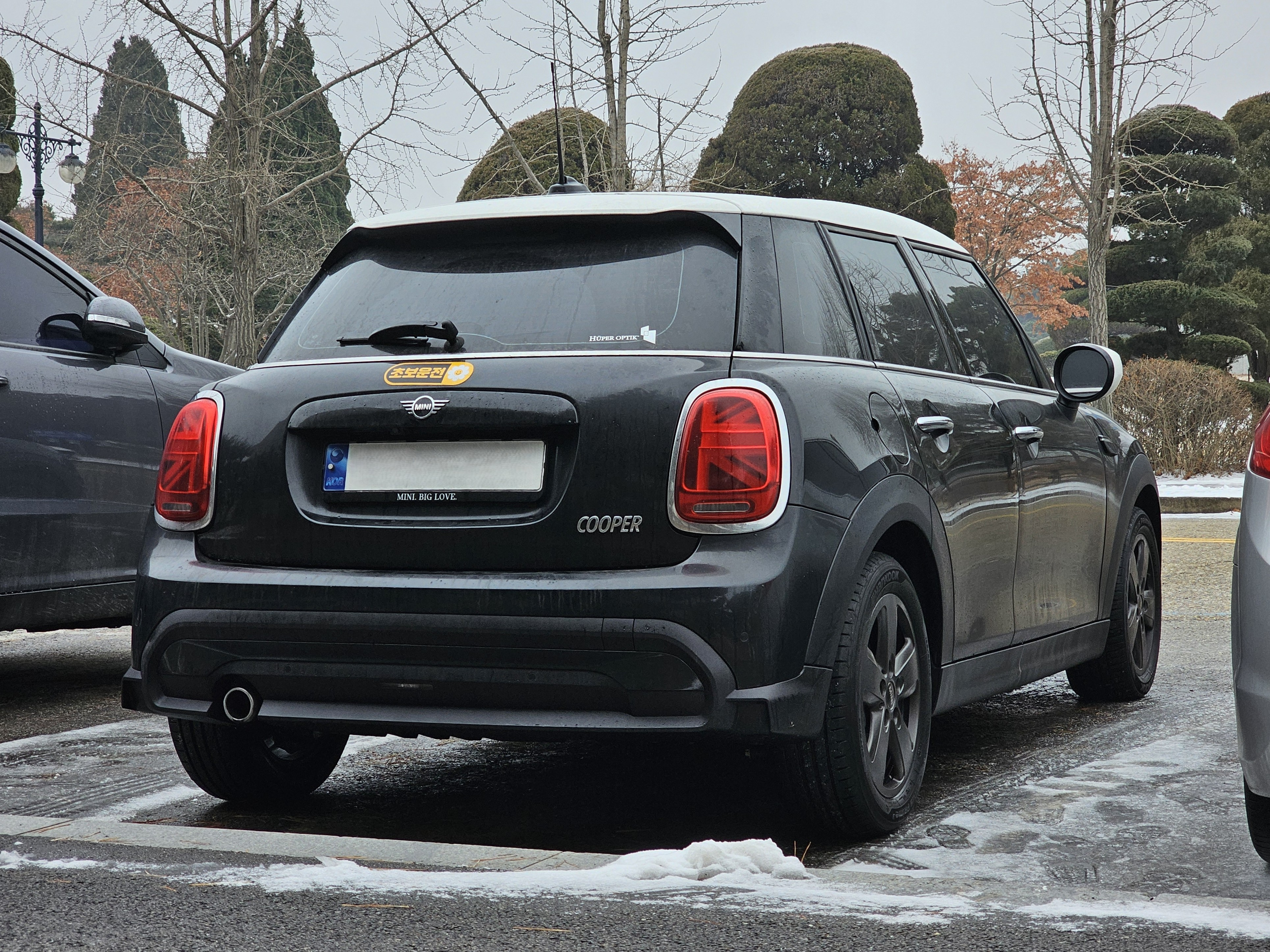
Rear view

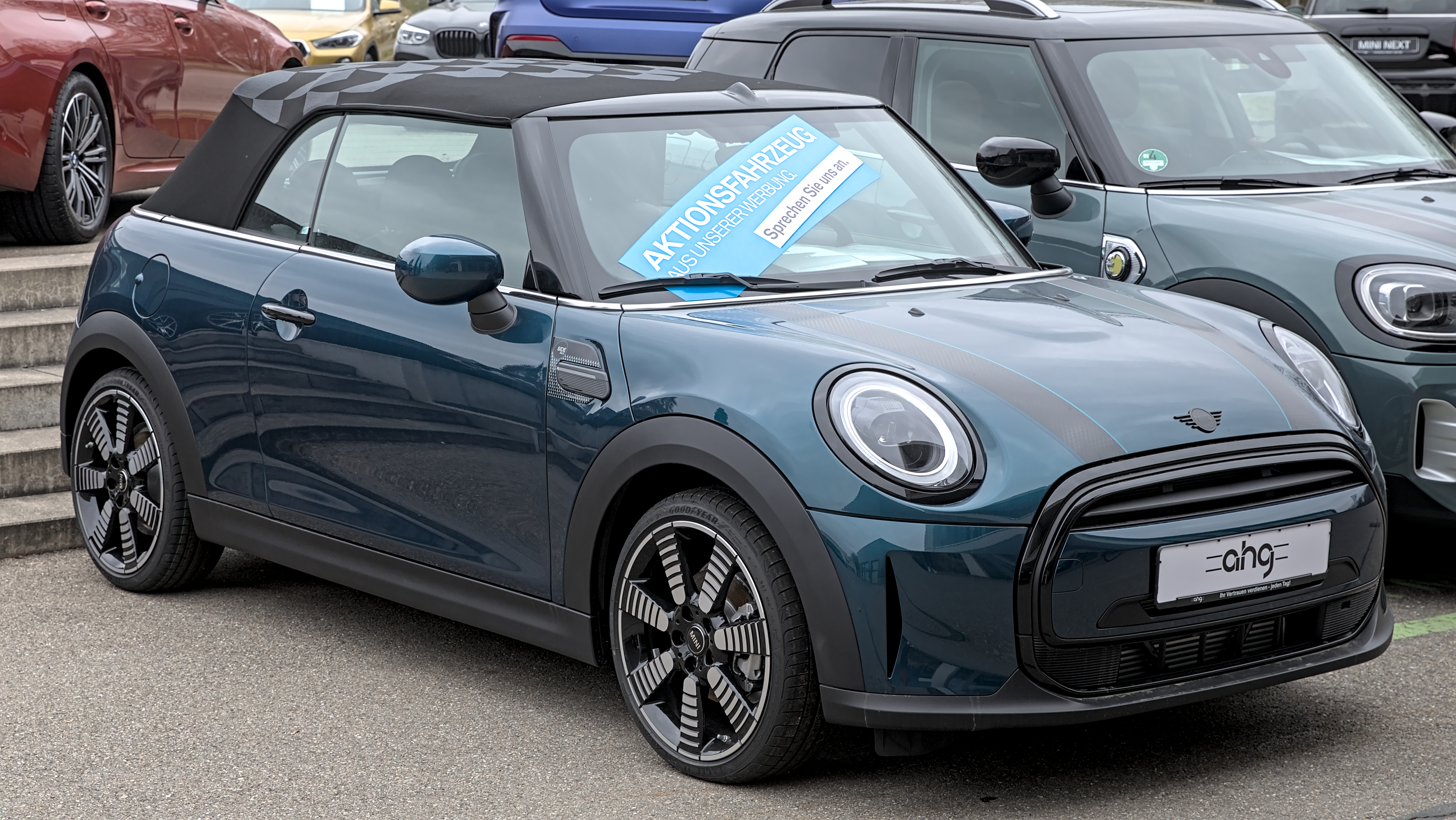
2-door convertible (second facelift)

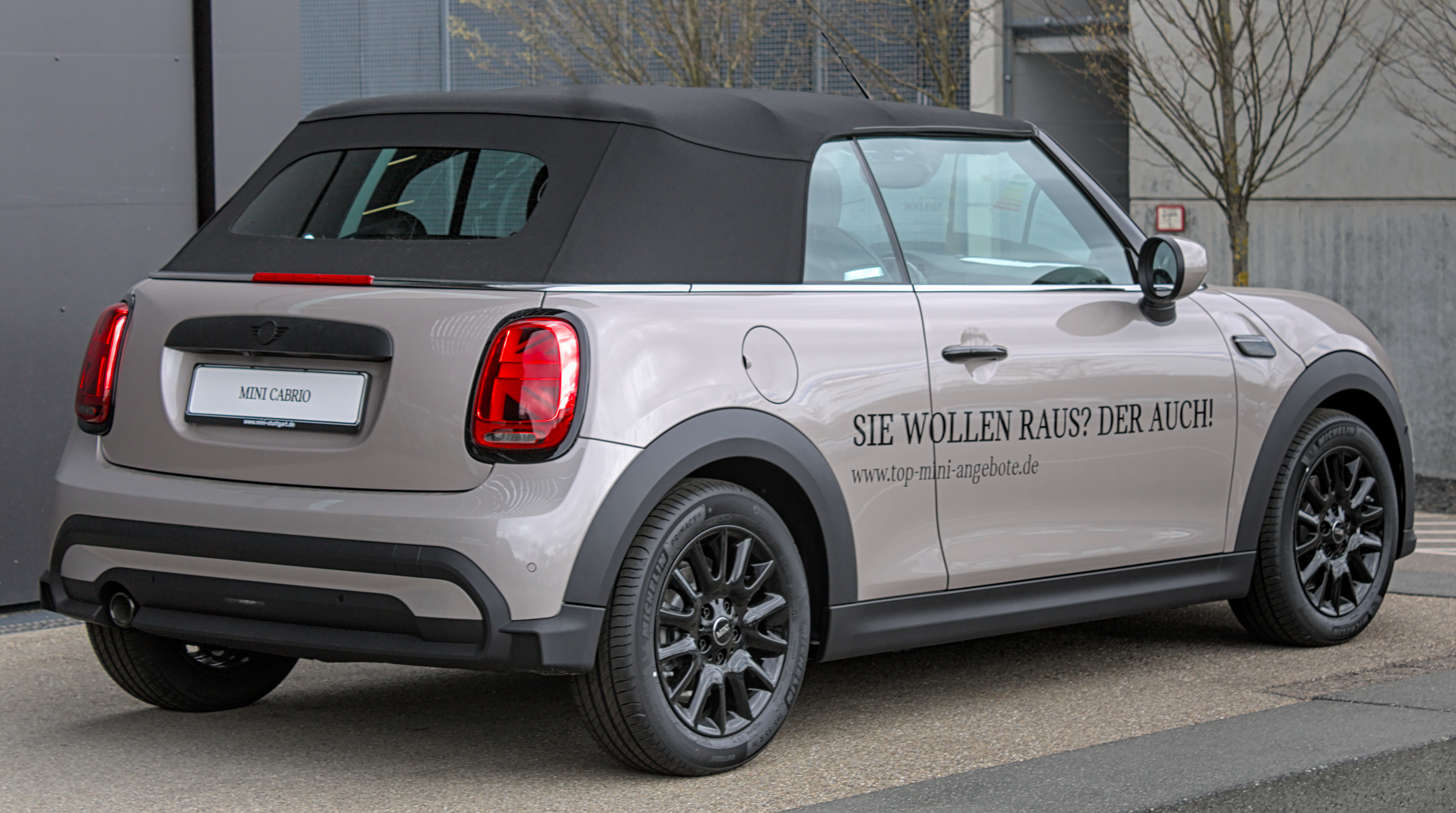
Rear view

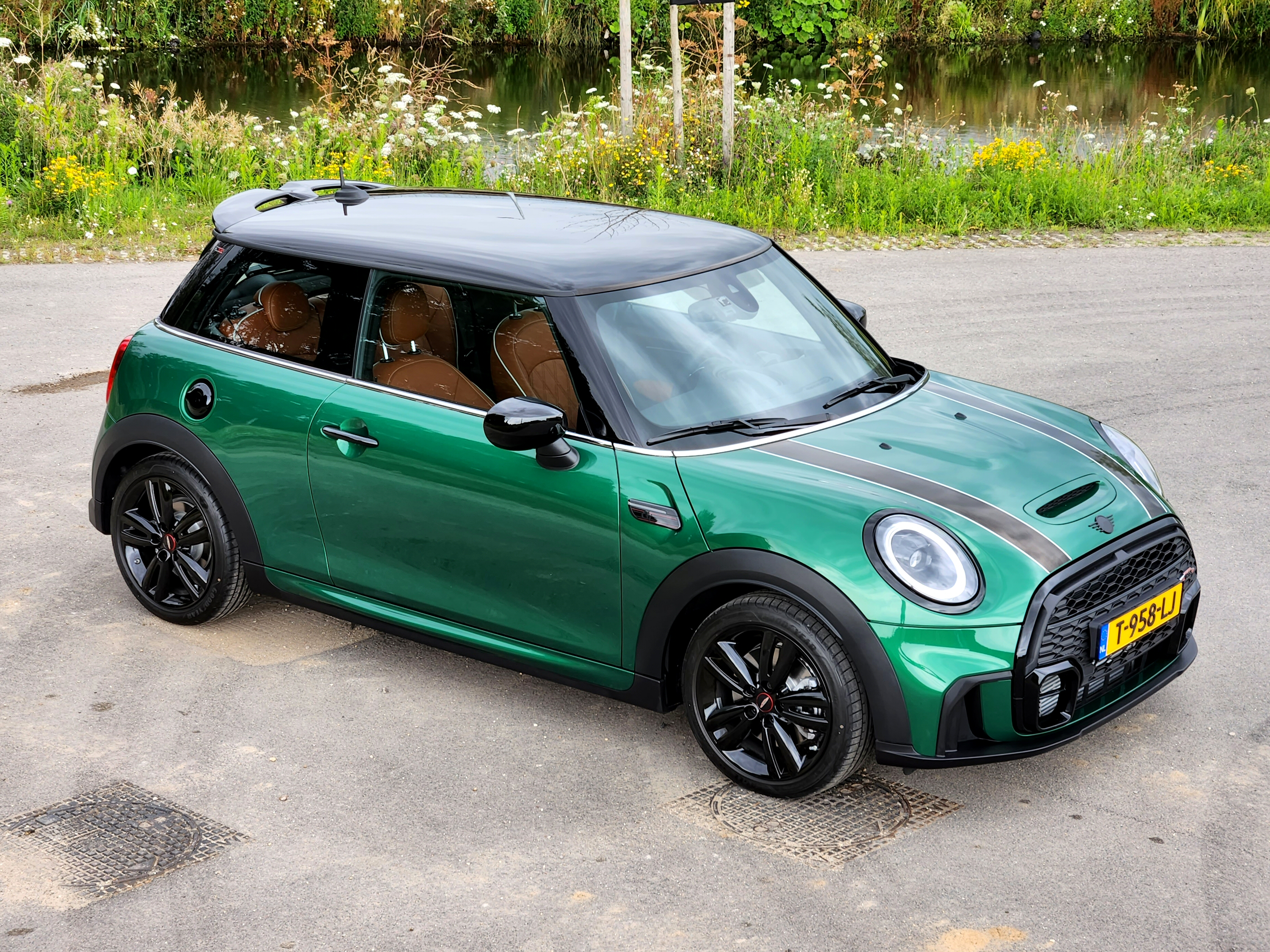
Second facelift with JCW optical package

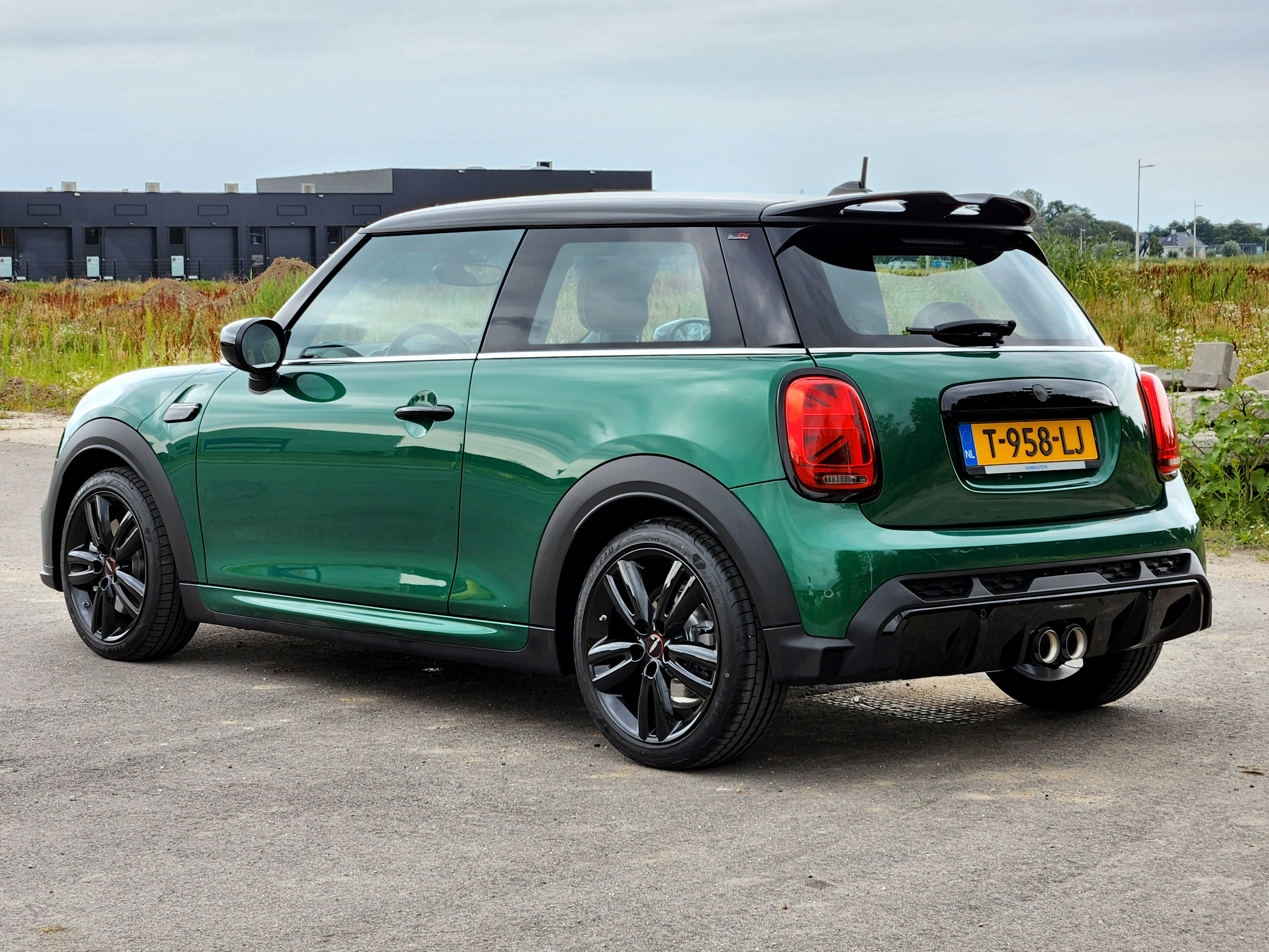
Second facelift with JCW optical package

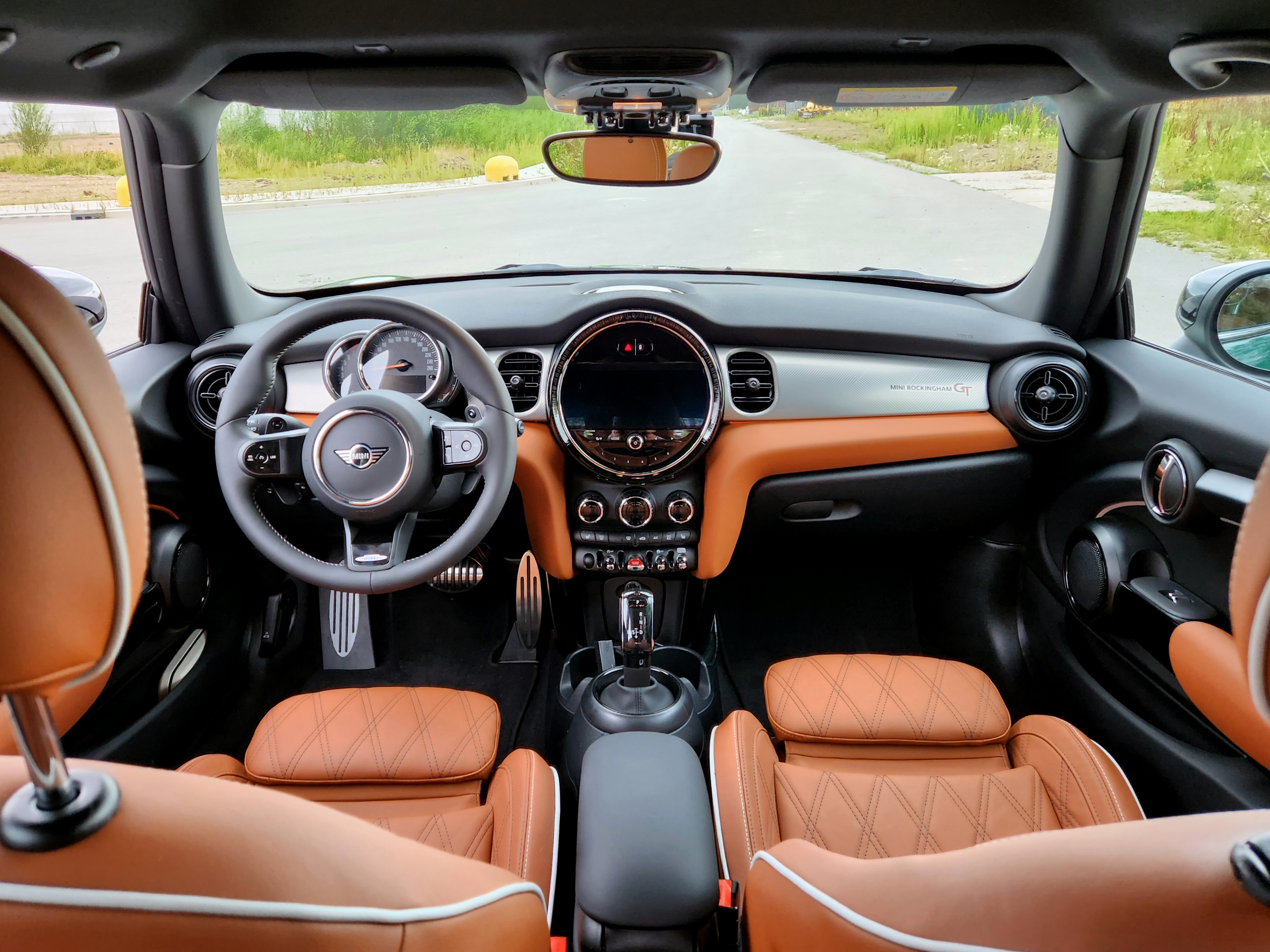
Interior of the second facelift

=== Powertrains ===
Model	Fuel type	Displacement	Cylinders	Transmission	Power	Torque	Top Speed	Acceleration, 0–62 mph (0–100 km/h)	Kerb weight
One First	Petrol	1.2 L (1,198 cc) LCI (2018–) 1.5 L (1,499 cc)	3	6-speed manual	55 kW (75 PS; 74 hp)	150 N⋅m (111 lb⋅ft)	165 km/h (103 mph)	13.4s	1,165 kg (2,568 lb)
One	Petrol	1.2 L (1,198 cc) LCI (2018–) 1.5 L (1,499 cc)	3	6-speed manual [6-speed auto] LCI (2018–) 6-speed manual [7-speed DCT]	75 kW (102 PS; 101 hp)	180 N⋅m (133 lb⋅ft); LCI (2018–) 190 N⋅m (140 lb⋅ft)	195 km/h (121 mph)	9.9 [10.2] s	1,165 kg (2,568 lb) [1,195 kg (2,635 lb)]
Cooper	Petrol	1.5 L (1,499 cc)	3	6-speed manual [6-speed auto] LCI (2018–) 6-speed manual [7-speed DCT]	100 kW (136 PS; 134 hp)	220 N⋅m (162 lb⋅ft)	210 km/h (130 mph)	7.9 [7.8] s	1,160 kg (2,560 lb) [1,190 kg (2,620 lb)]
Cooper S	Petrol	2.0 L (1,998 cc)	4	6-speed manual [6-speed auto] LCI (2018–) 6-speed manual [7-speed DCT]	141 kW (192 PS; 189 hp)	280 N⋅m (207 lb⋅ft)	235 km/h (146 mph)	6.8 [6.7] s	1,205 kg (2,657 lb) [1,220 kg (2,690 lb)]
John Cooper Works	Petrol	2.0 L (1,998 cc)	4	6-speed manual [6-speed auto] LCI (2018–) 6-speed manual [8-speed auto]	170 kW (231 PS; 228 hp)	320 N⋅m (236 lb⋅ft)	246 km/h (153 mph)	6.3 [6.1] s	1,205 kg (2,657 lb) [1,220 kg (2,690 lb)]
JCW GP	Petrol	2.0 L (1,998 cc)	4	8-speed auto	225 kW (306 PS; 302 hp)	450 N⋅m (332 lb⋅ft)	265 km/h (165 mph)	5.2 s	1,255 kg (2,767 lb)
One D	Diesel	1.5 L (1,496 cc)	3	6-speed manual	70 kW (95 PS; 94 hp)	220 N⋅m (162 lb⋅ft)	190 km/h (118 mph)	11.6 s	1,190 kg (2,620 lb)
Cooper D	Diesel	1.5 L (1,496 cc)	3	6-speed manual [6-speed auto] LCI (2018–) 6-speed manual [7-speed DCT]	85 kW (116 PS; 114 hp)	270 N⋅m (199 lb⋅ft)	205 km/h (127 mph)	9.2 [9.2] s	1,210 kg (2,670 lb) [1,225 kg (2,701 lb)]
Cooper SD	Diesel	2.0 L (1,995 cc)	4	6-speed manual [6-speed auto] LCI (2018–) [8-speed auto]	125 kW (170 PS; 168 hp)	360 N⋅m (266 lb⋅ft)	227 km/h (141 mph)	7.2 [7.2] s	1,250 kg (2,760 lb) [1,265 kg (2,789 lb)]
Cooper SE	Electric	32.6-kWh battery		1-speed Automatic with single-stage configuration and integrated differential	135 kW (184 PS; 181 hp)	270 N⋅m (199 lb⋅ft)	150 km/h (93 mph)	7.3 s	

=== Safety ===
Euro NCAP test results* MINI Cooper 1.5 Base (RHD) (2014)
Test	Points	%
Overall:	4 /5 stars	
Adult occupant:	30.1	79%
Child occupant:	36.1	73%
Pedestrian:	24.1	66%
Safety assist:	7.3	56%

ANCAP test results* Mini Cooper (2014)
Test	Score
Overall	4 /5 stars
Frontal offset	14.60/16
Side impact	12.19/16
Pole	2/2
Seat belt reminders	3/3
Whiplash protection	Good
Pedestrian protection	Adequate
Electronic stability control	Standard

== Fourth generation (J01/F65/66/67; 2023) ==
=== Battery electric (J01; 2023) ===
Fourth generation
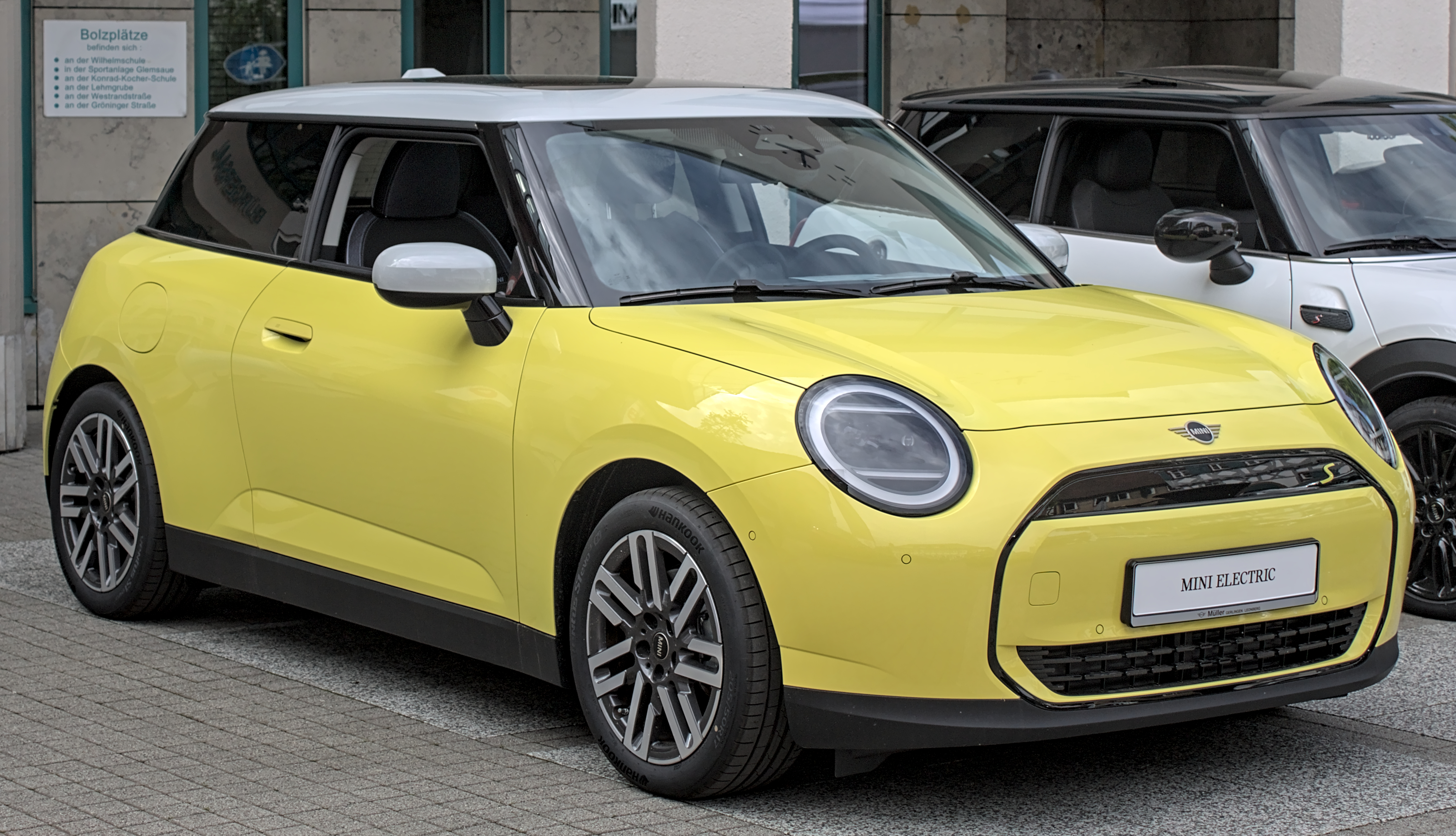
- Mini Cooper SE (J01)

Overview
- Model code: J01
- Production: October 2023 – present
- Assembly: China: Zhangjiagang, Jiangsu (Spotlight Automotive)
- Designer: Thomas Sycha

Body and chassis
- Body style: 3-door hatchback
- Layout: Front-motor, front-wheel-drive
- Related: Mini Aceman

Powertrain
- Electric motor: Permanent magnet synchronous
- Power output: 135 kW (181 hp; 184 PS) (Cooper E); 160 kW (215 hp; 218 PS) (Cooper SE); 190 kW (255 hp; 258 PS) (JCW Electric)
- Battery: 40.7 kWh SVOLT NMC (Cooper E); 54.2 kWh SVOLT NMC (Cooper SE / JCW Electric)

Dimensions
- Wheelbase: 2,526 mm (99.4 in)
- Length: 3,858 mm (151.9 in)
- Width: 1,756 mm (69.1 in)
- Height: 1,460 mm (57.5 in)
- Kerb weight: 1,540–1,605 kg (3,395–3,538 lb)

Chronology
- Predecessor: Mini Electric

The fourth-generation battery electric Mini hatchback was unveiled on 1 September 2023. Exclusively available as a 3-door hatchback, the model is marketed as the Mini Cooper regardless of the trim level. European sales started in 2024. A heavily refreshed version of the third-generation Mini Hatch is sold alongside this generation since 2024 as the internal combustion engined (ICE) option. The J01 Cooper is available in two configurations, Cooper E and Cooper SE.

The model was developed and produced by Spotlight Automotive, a joint venture between BMW Group and Great Wall Motor, at a newly built manufacturing plant in Zhangjiagang, Jiangsu, China. The first mass-produced units rolled off from the plant on 14 October 2023. Mini's Oxford Plant in Oxford, England, was set to begin production of the electric J01 in 2026. In 2025, the plan to produce the electric model at the Oxford plant was paused, leaving China as the only plant to produce the model.

The Cooper receives a simplified interior layout, where a fully circular OLED touchscreen in the centre with a 240 mm (9.45 in) diameter based on the OS9 operating system becomes the only physical display in the interior.

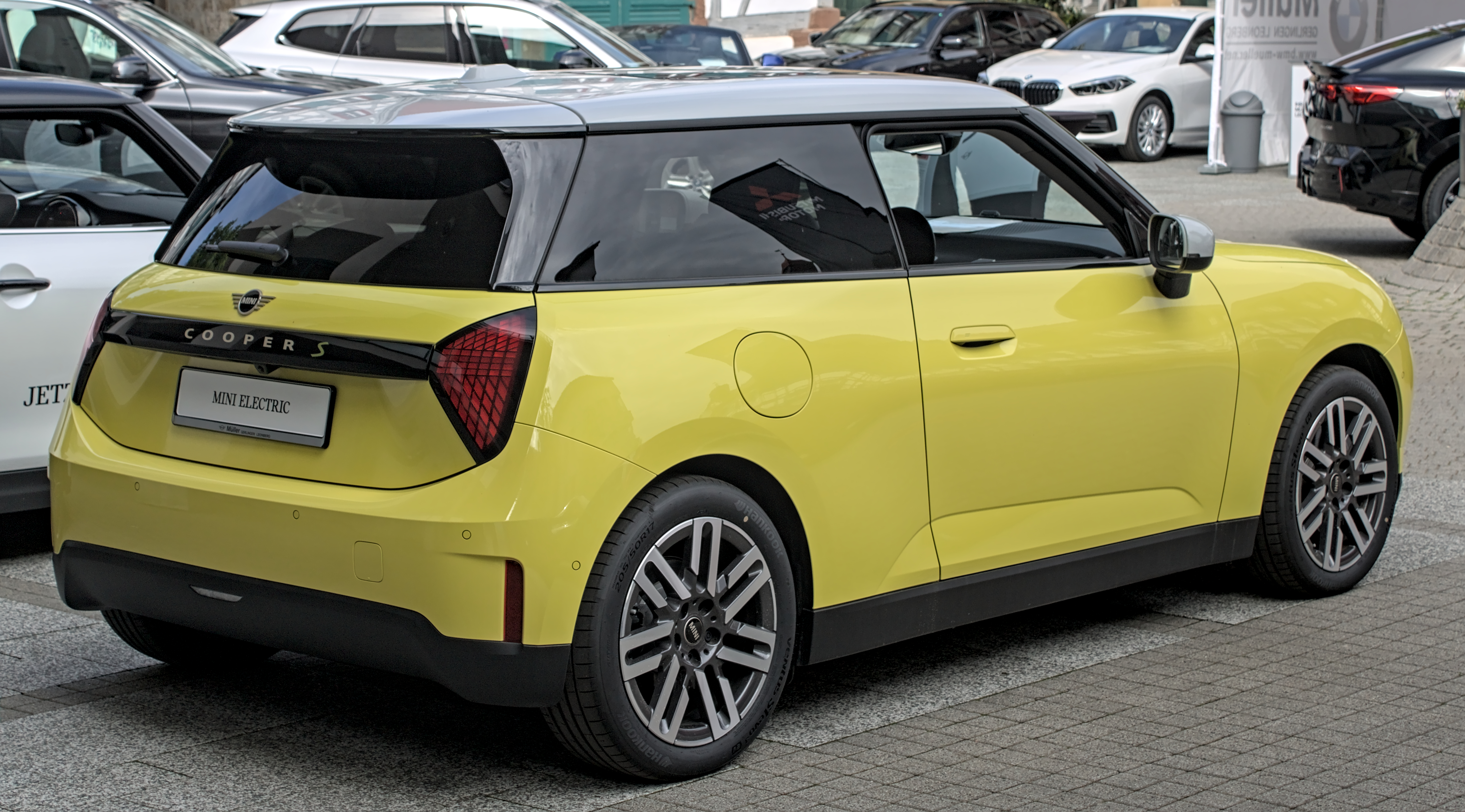
Cooper SE Rear View

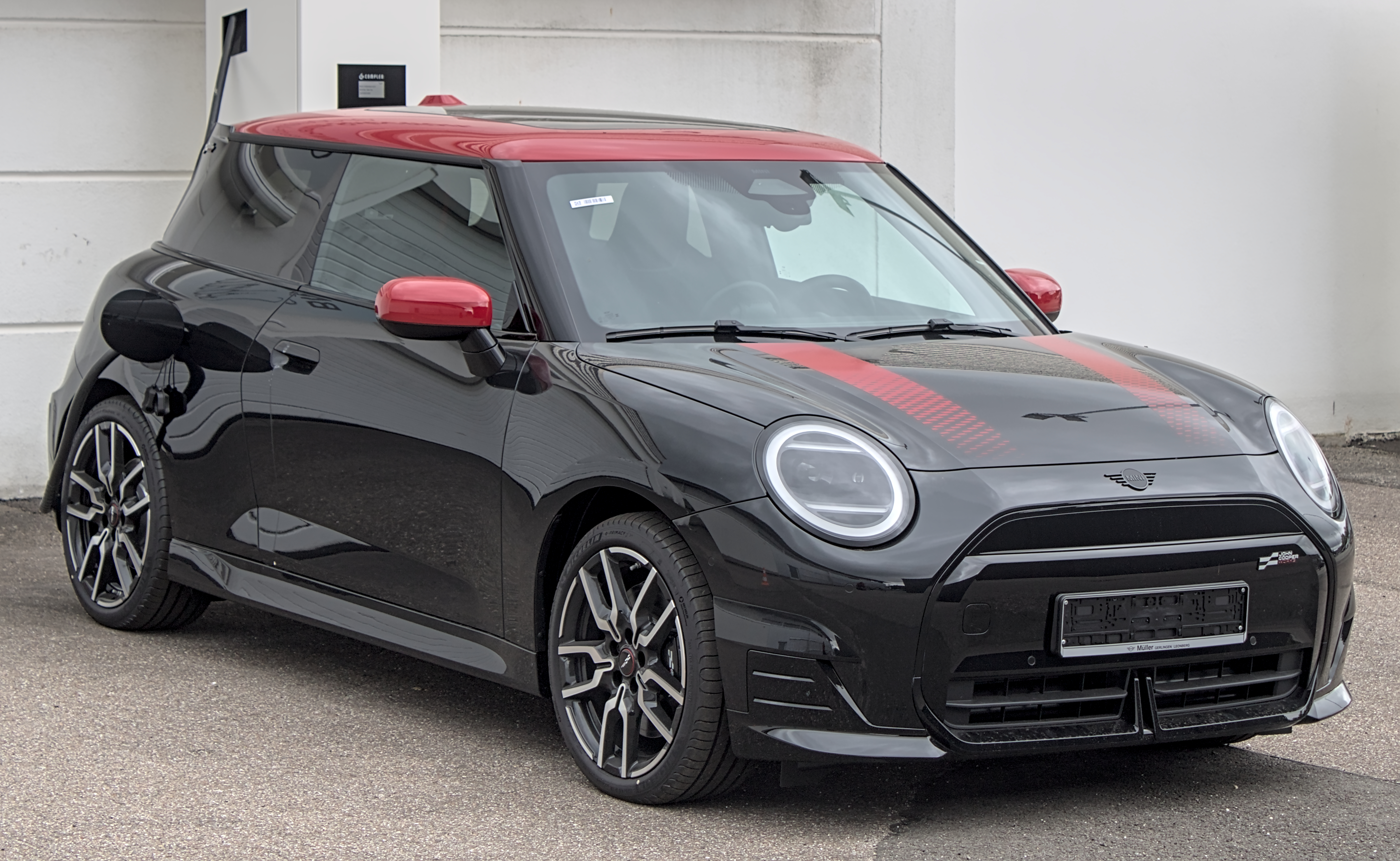
Cooper SE JCW-Style

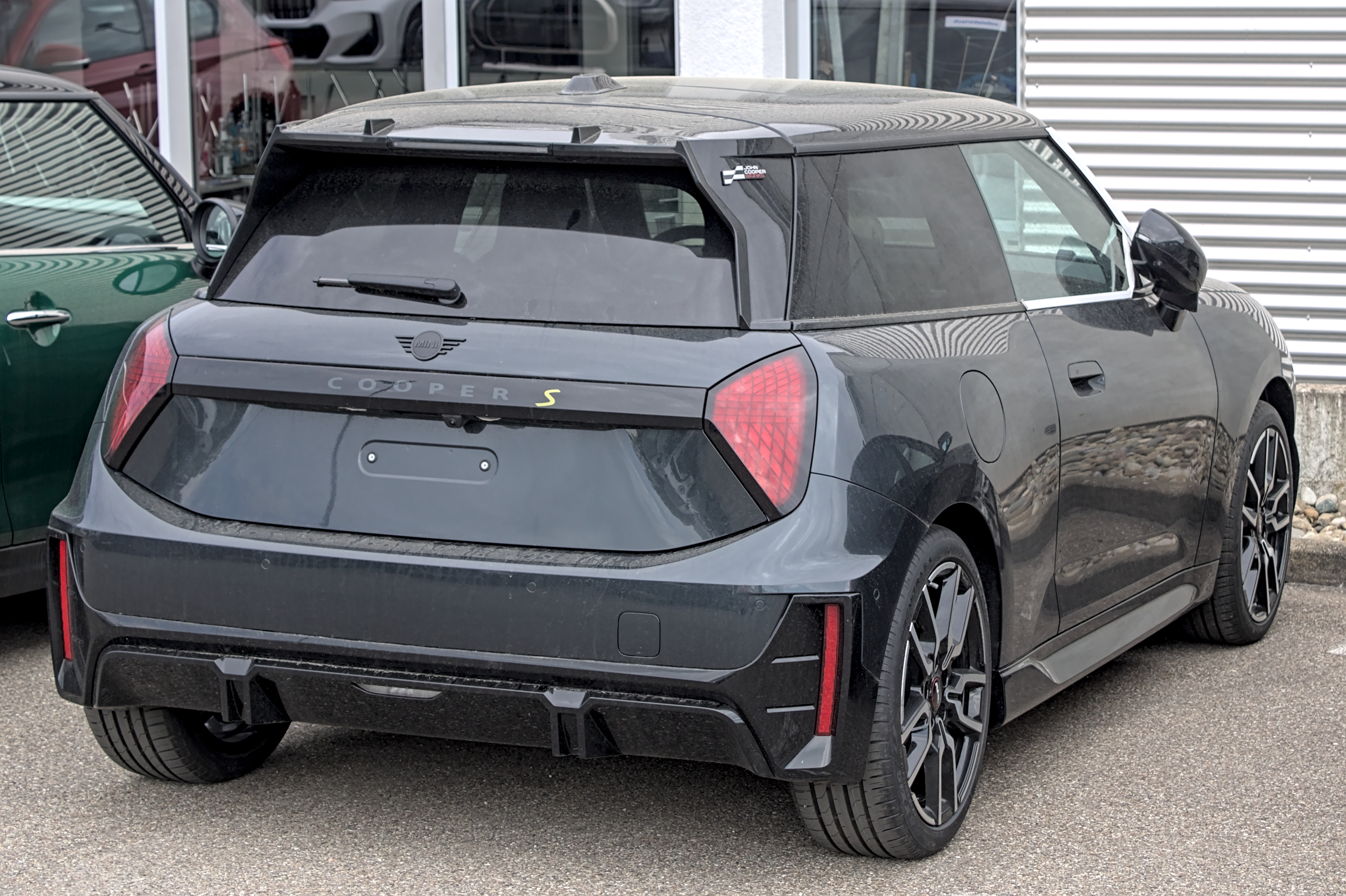
Rear View

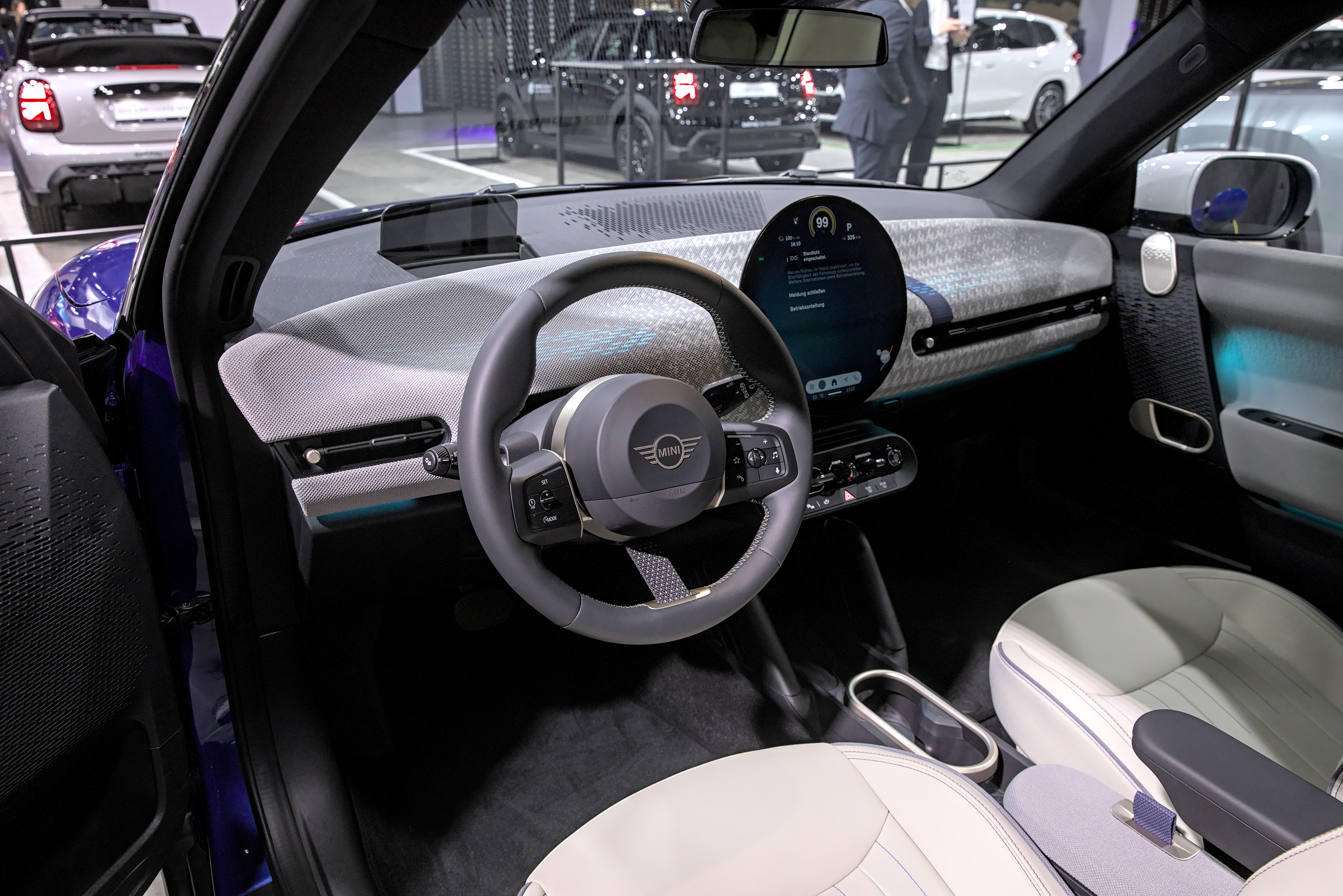
Interior

==== Powertrain ====
Model	Battery	Power	Torque	Range	Charging rate	0–100 km/h (0–62 mph)(official)	Layout	Cal. years
Cooper E	40.7 kWh	135 kW (181 hp; 184 PS)	290 N⋅m (214 lb⋅ft)	305 km (190 mi)	11 kW (AC); 75 kW (DC)	7.3 seconds	Single motor FWD	2024
Cooper SE	54.2 kWh	160 kW (215 hp; 218 PS)	330 N⋅m (243 lb⋅ft)	402 km (250 mi)	11 kW (AC); 95 kW (DC)	6.7 seconds	Single motor FWD	2024
JCW Electric	54.2 kWh	190 kW (255 hp; 258 PS)	350 N⋅m (258 lb⋅ft)	371 km (231 mi)	11 kW (AC); 95 kW (DC)	5.9 seconds	Single motor FWD	2024

=== Internal combustion (F65/66/67; 2024) ===
Fourth generation
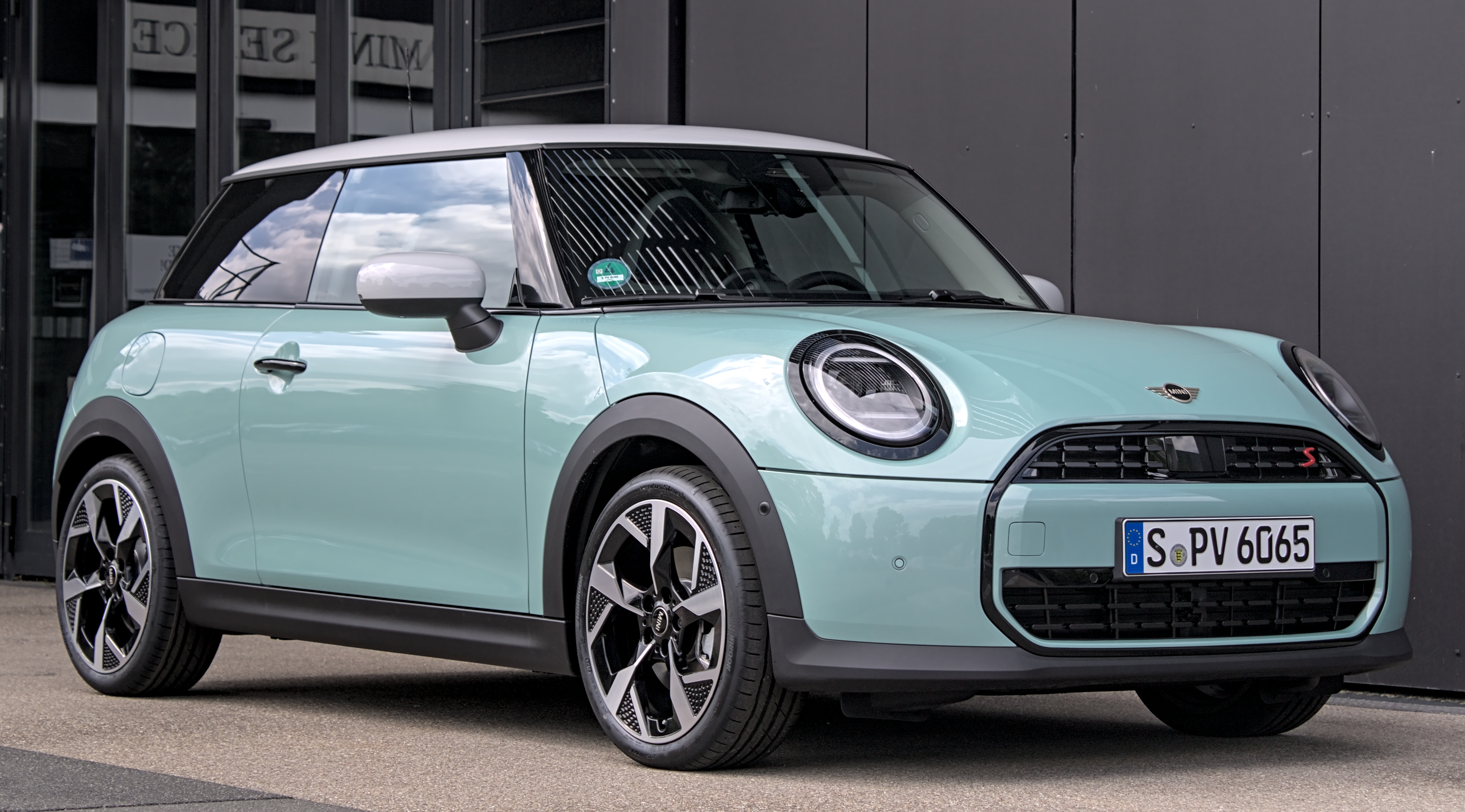
- Mini Cooper S 3-door

Overview
- Model code: F65 (5-door); F66 (3-door); F67 (convertible)
- Production: March 2024 – present
- Model years: 2025–present (North America)
- Assembly: United Kingdom: Cowley, Oxfordshire (Plant Oxford)

Body and chassis
- Body style: 3-door hatchback; 5-door hatchback; 2-door convertible
- Platform: BMW UKL1

Powertrain
- Engine: Petrol: 1.5 L B38A15 turbo I3 (Cooper C); 2.0 L B48A20 turbo I4 (Cooper C (North America and South Korea),Cooper S/JCW)
- Transmission: 7-speed DCT

Dimensions
- Wheelbase: 2,495 mm (98.2 in)
- Length: 3,876 mm (152.6 in)
- Width: 1,744 mm (68.7 in)
- Height: 1,432 mm (56.4 in)
- Kerb weight: 1,357 kg (2,991 lb)

The UK-produced, internal combustion engined (ICE) version of the Cooper is extended into the fourth-generation. Developed under the model code F66 (3-door), the car debuted online on 6 February 2024. It is heavily based on the previous generation model, while introducing updated styling with similar design elements from the battery electric J01 Cooper.

The F66 Cooper is available in two trims, namely the Cooper C and Cooper S. The Cooper C uses a 1.5-litre three-cylinder turbocharged engine, producing 156 PS (154 hp; 115 kW) of power and 230 N⋅m (170 lb⋅ft) of torque. The Cooper S uses a more powerful 2.0-litre four-cylinder turbocharged engine producing 204 PS (201 hp; 150 kW) of power and 300 N⋅m (221 lb⋅ft) of torque. Both engines are paired with a 7-speed dual-clutch transmission.

In the North American market, the F66 Cooper is offered in two trims, the Cooper (also known as Cooper C for the Canadian market) and Cooper S, both powered by a 2.0-litre turbocharged four-cylinder engine. In the base Cooper, the engine produces 161 hp (163 PS; 120 kW) and 184 lb⋅ft (249 N⋅m; 25.4 kg⋅m) of torque, while the Cooper S produces 201 hp (204 PS; 150 kW) and 221 lb⋅ft (300 N⋅m; 30.6 kg⋅m) of torque.

=== Mini John Cooper Works ===
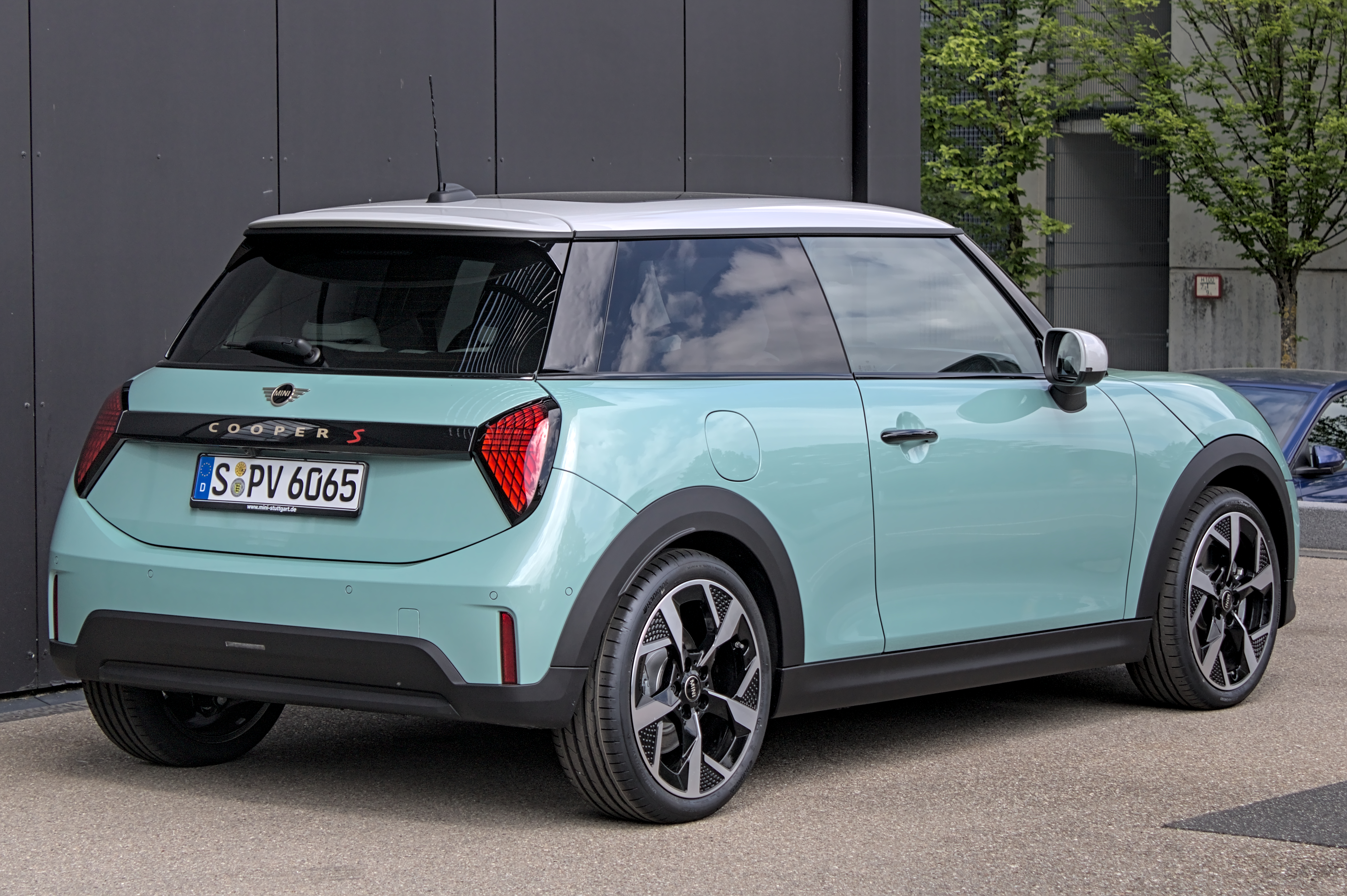
Cooper S Rear View Classic Trim

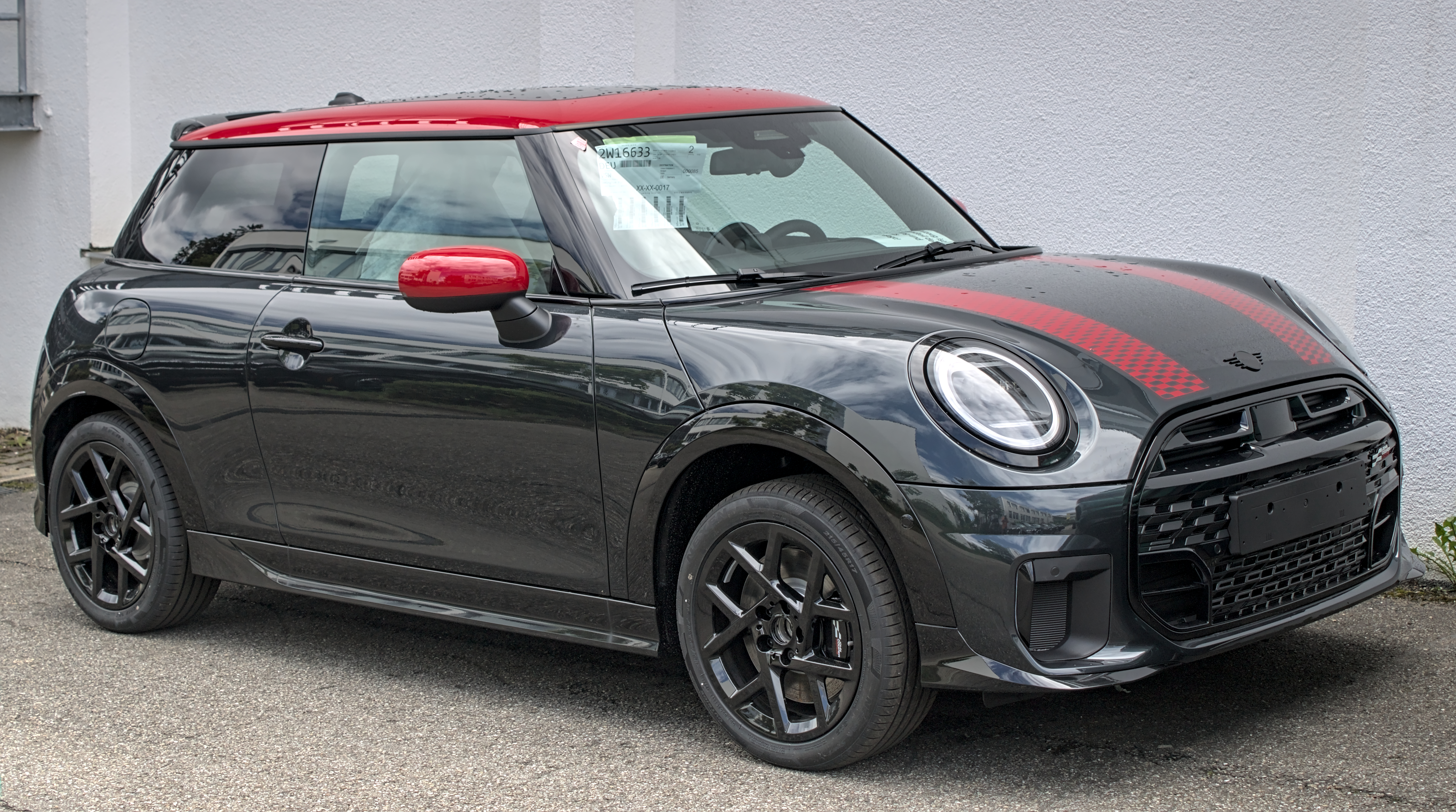
Mini Cooper S 3-Door JCW-Style

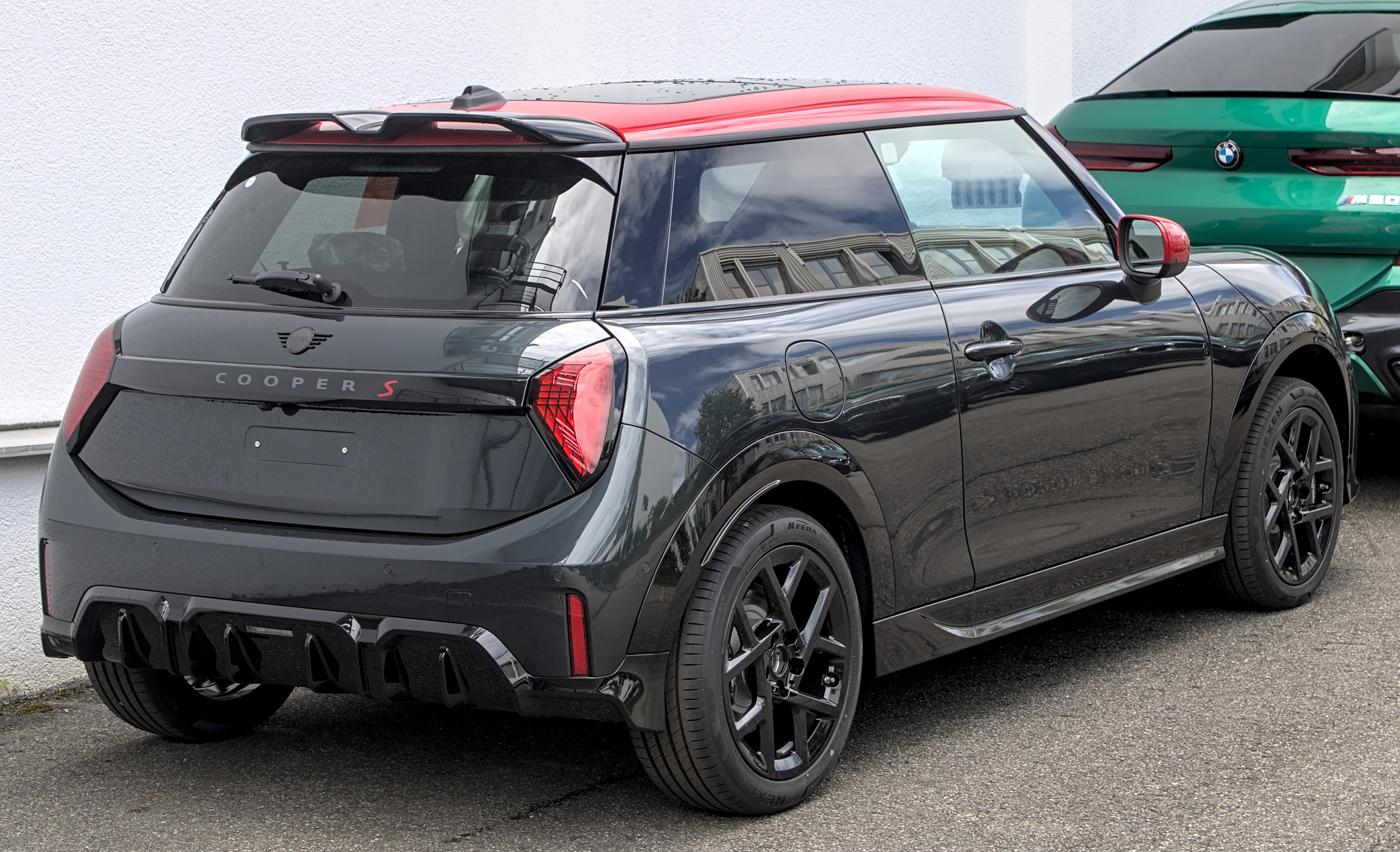
Rear View

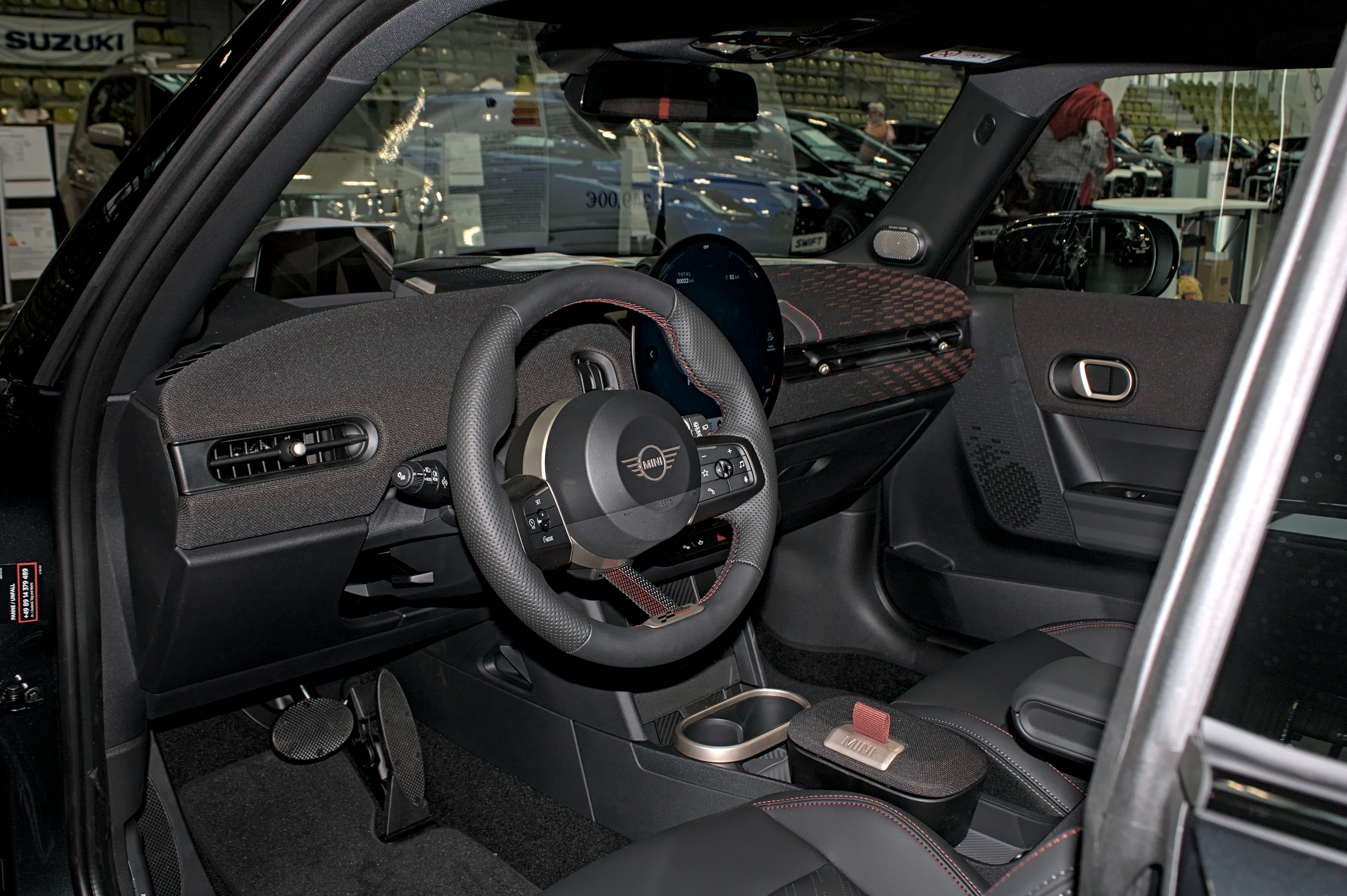
Interior JCW-Style

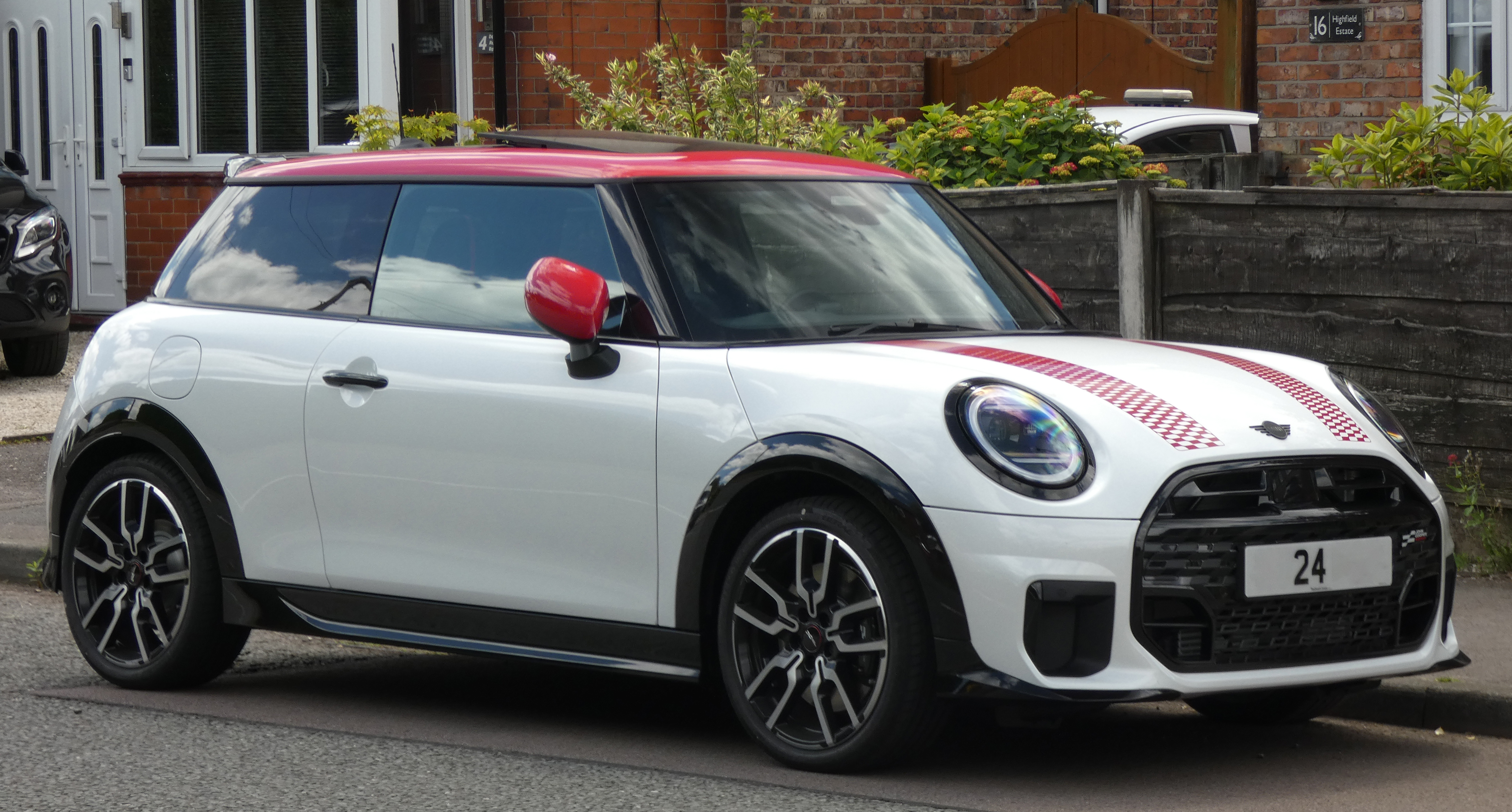
Mini Cooper C 3-Door JCW-Style

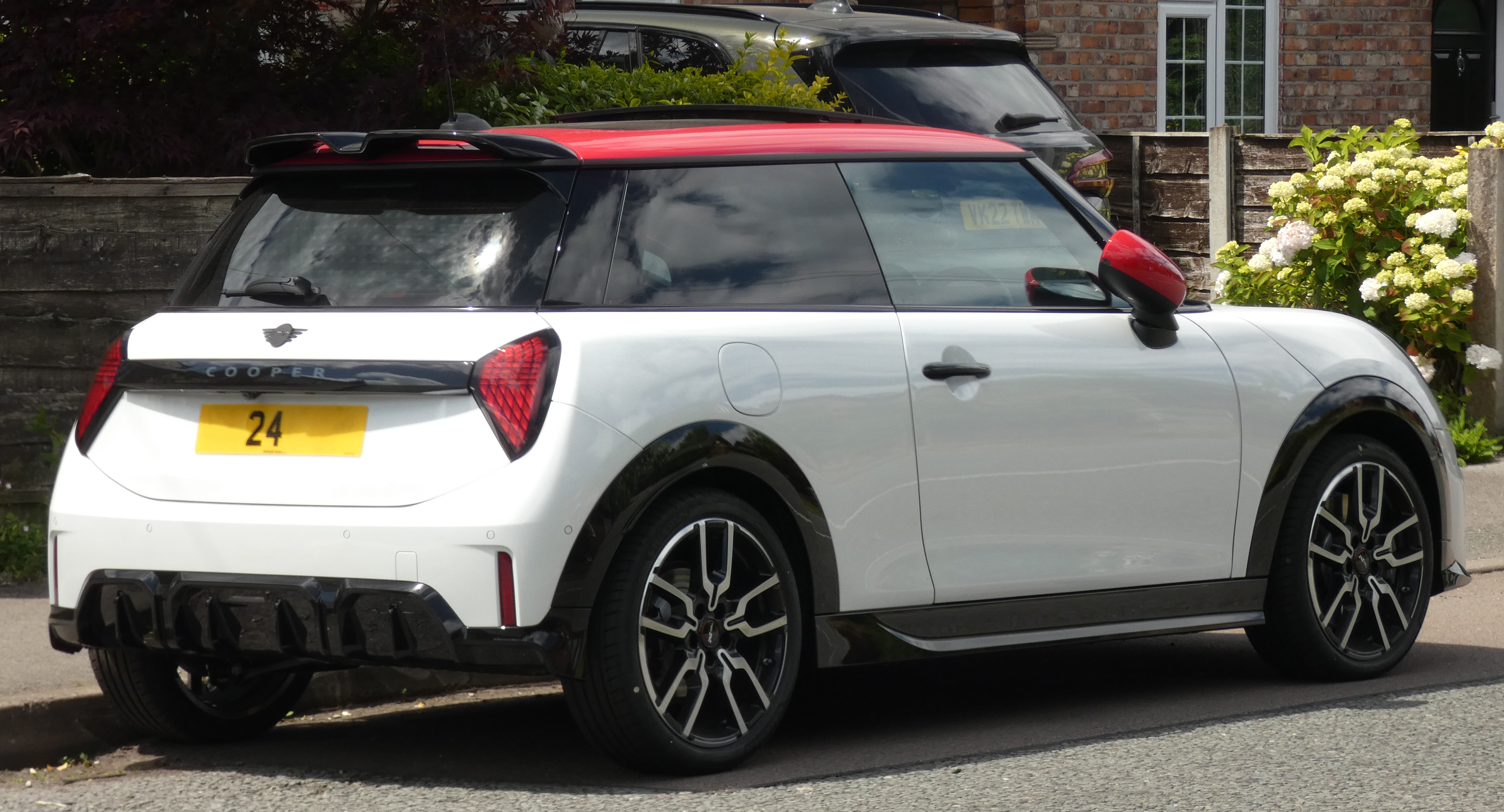
Rear View

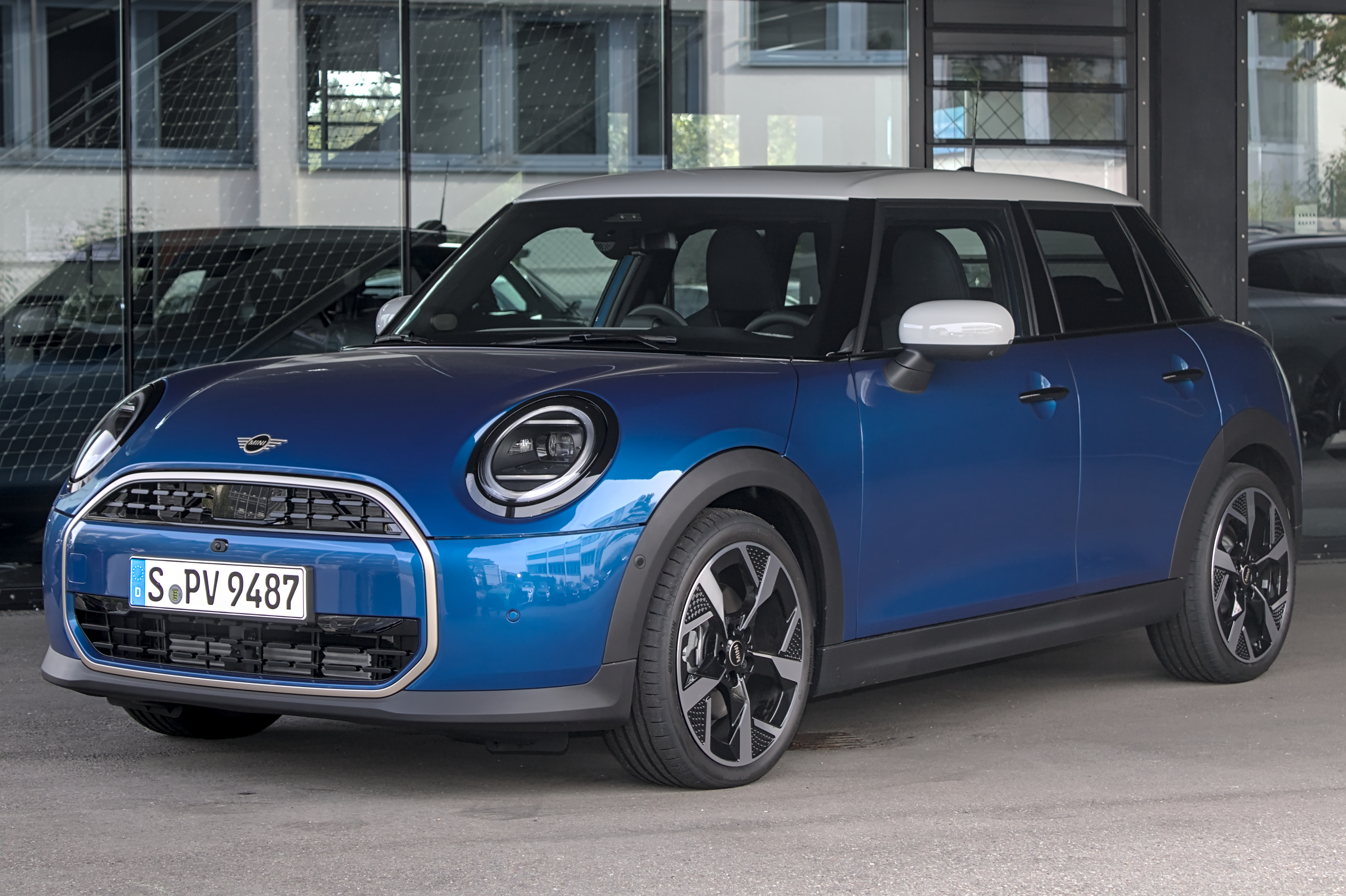
Mini Cooper C 5-Door Favored Trim

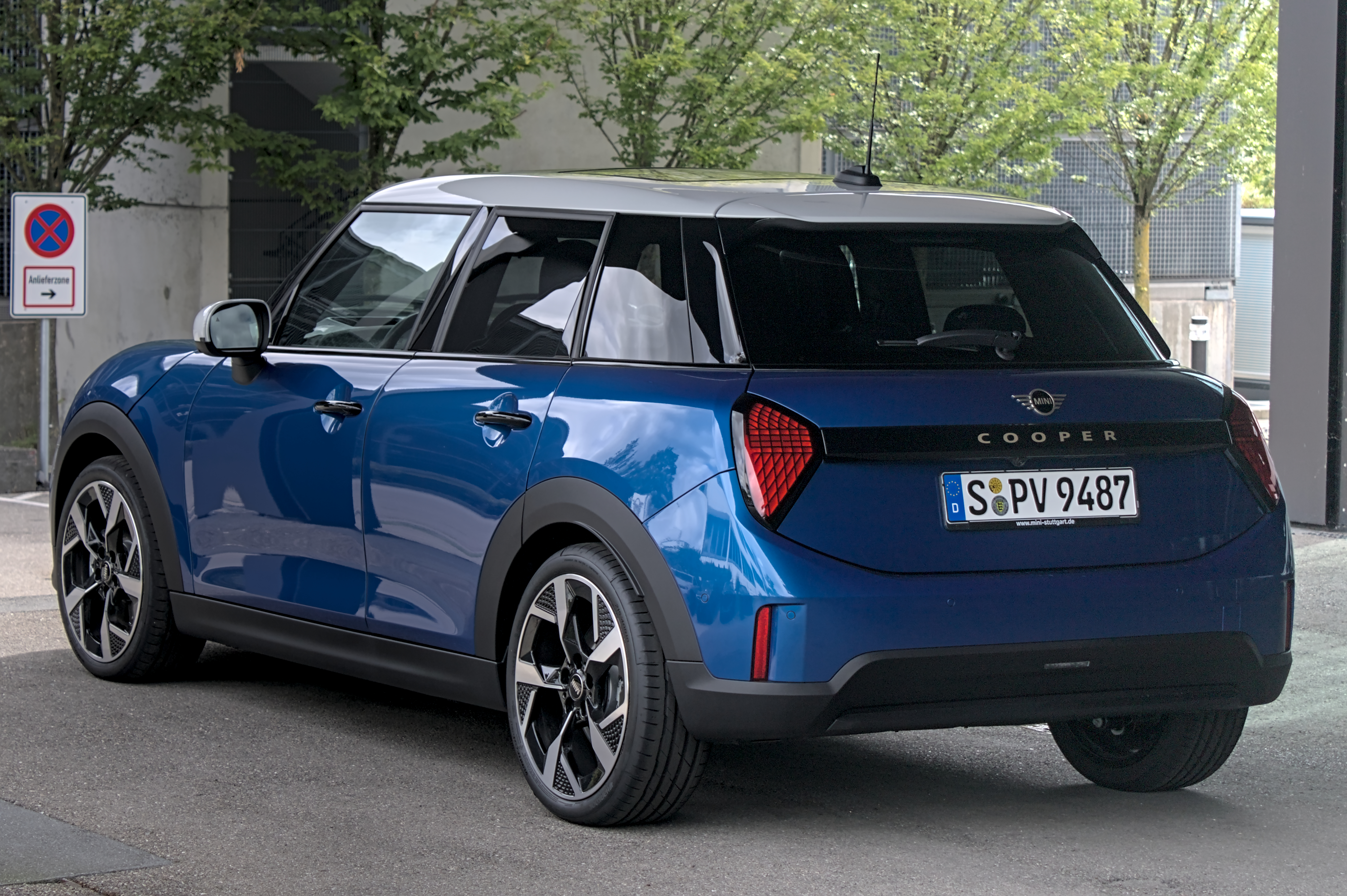
Rear View

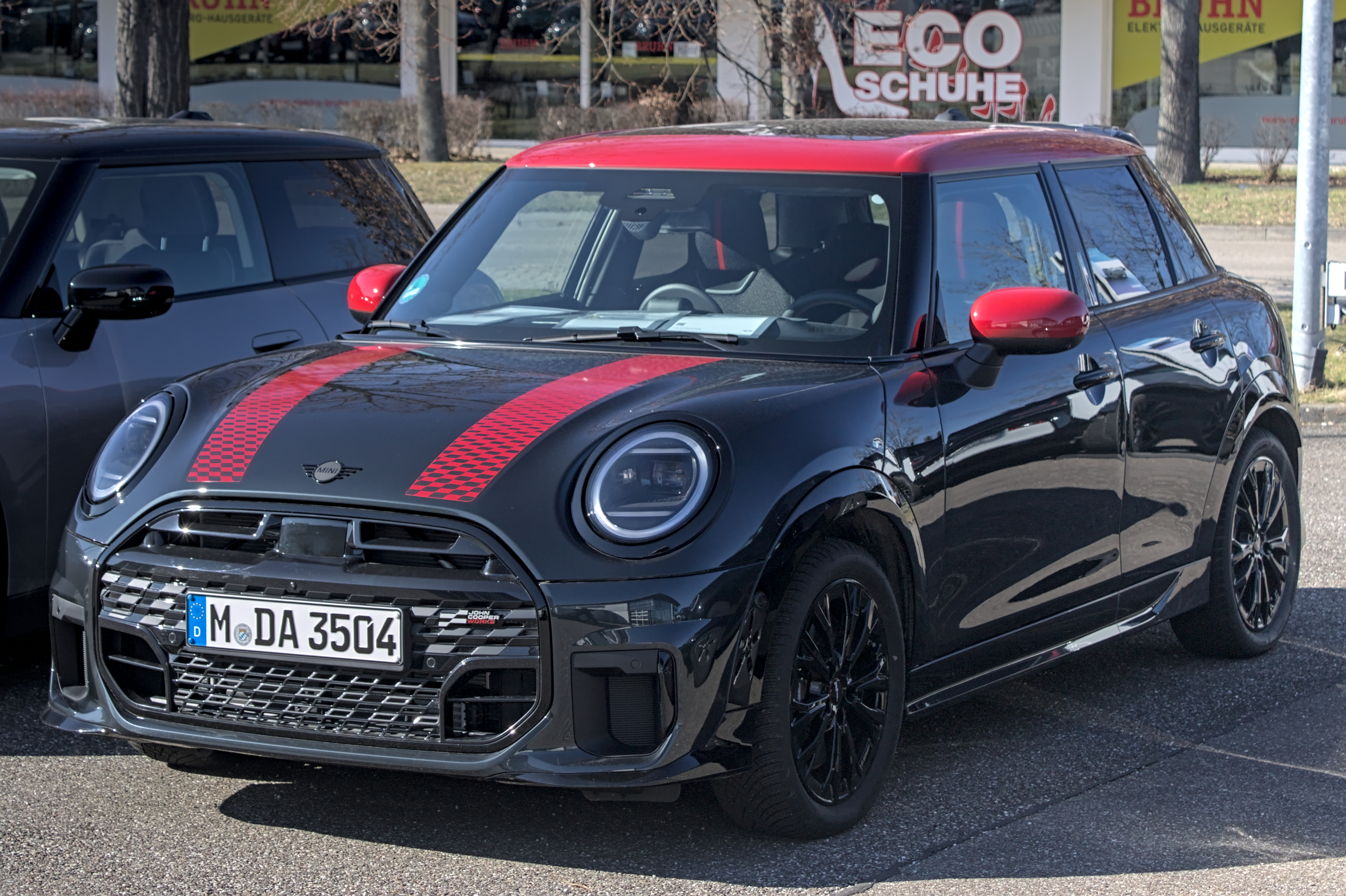
Mini Cooper S 5-Door JCW-Style

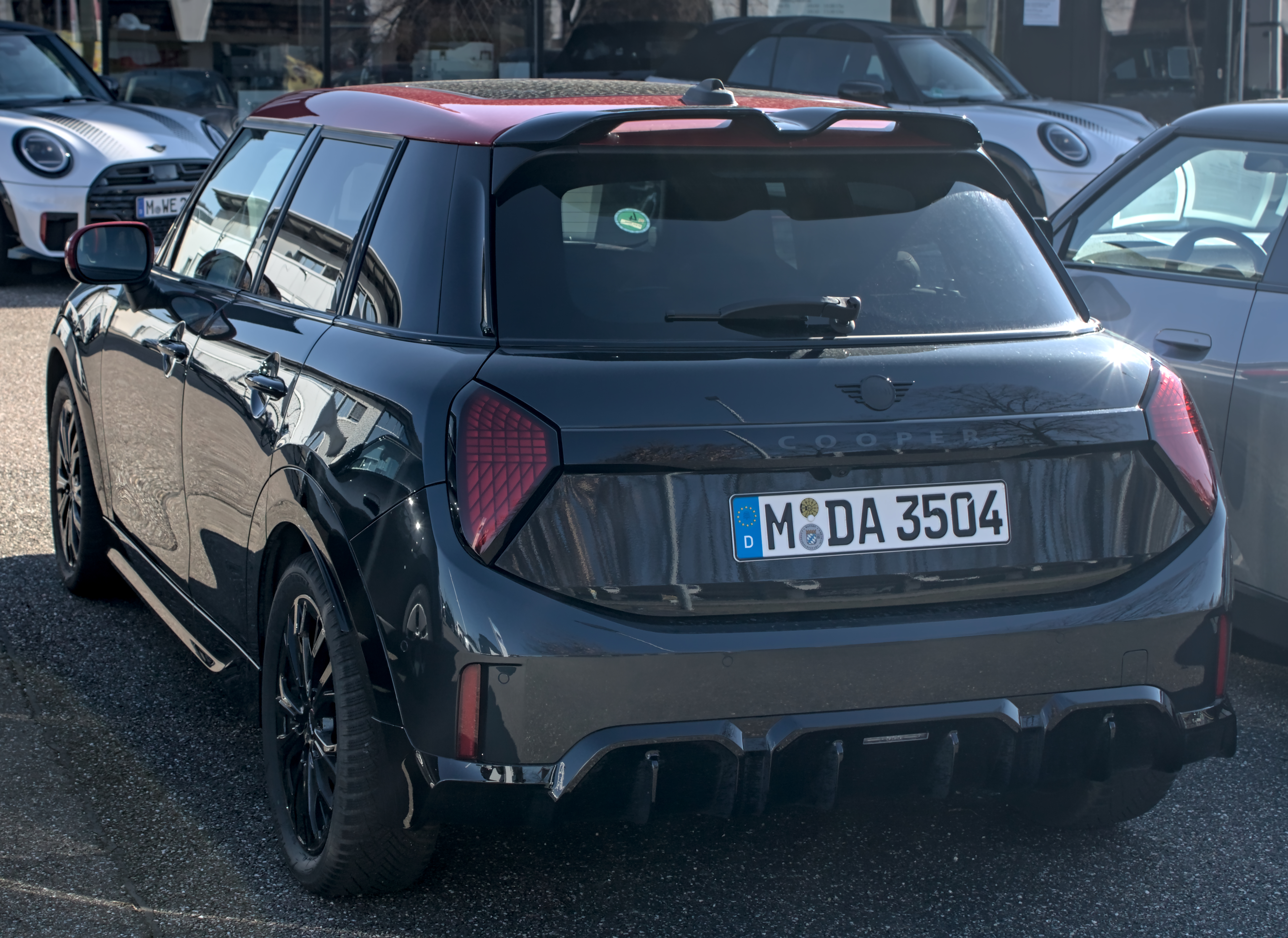
Rear View

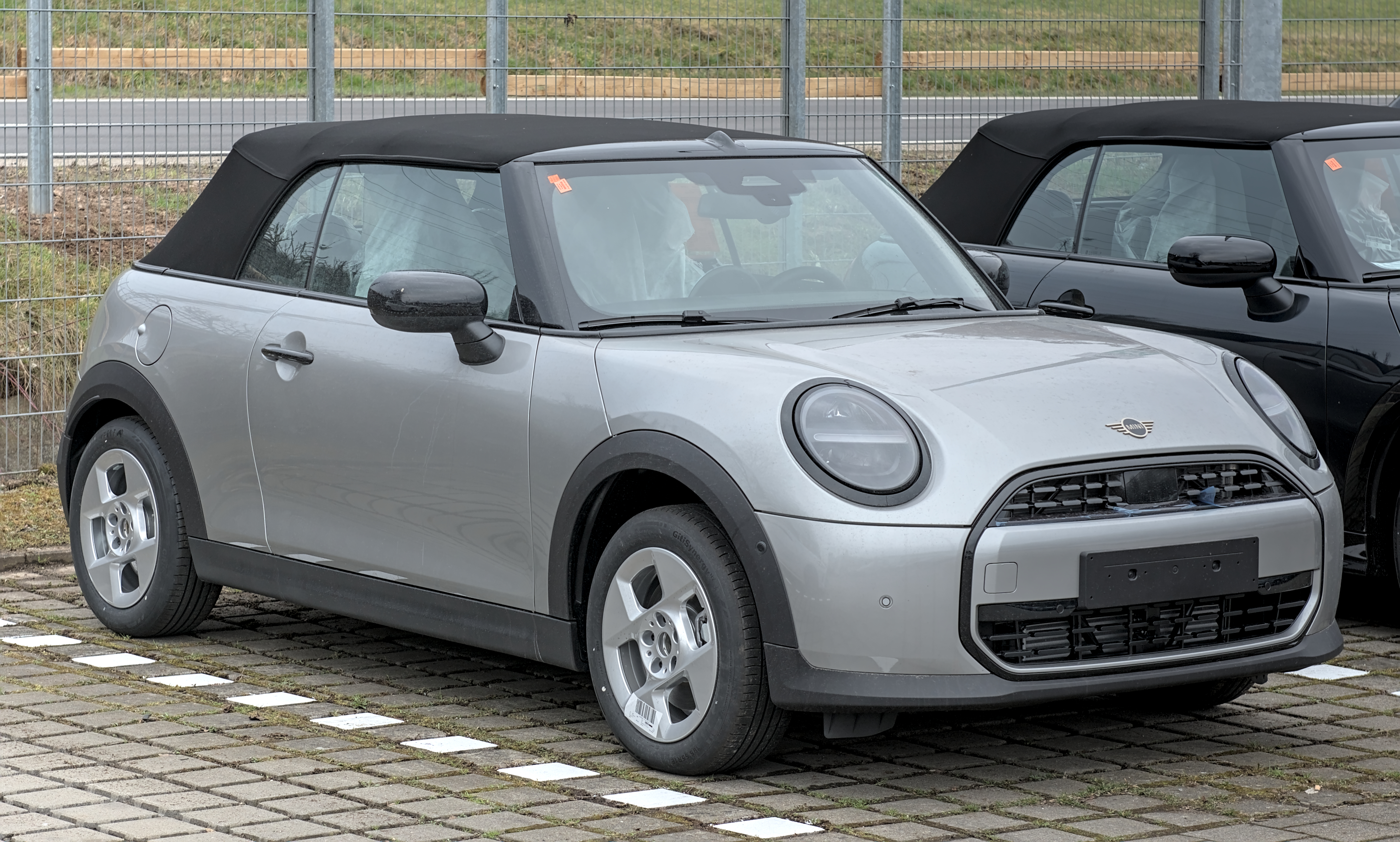
Mini Cooper C Convertible Classic Trim

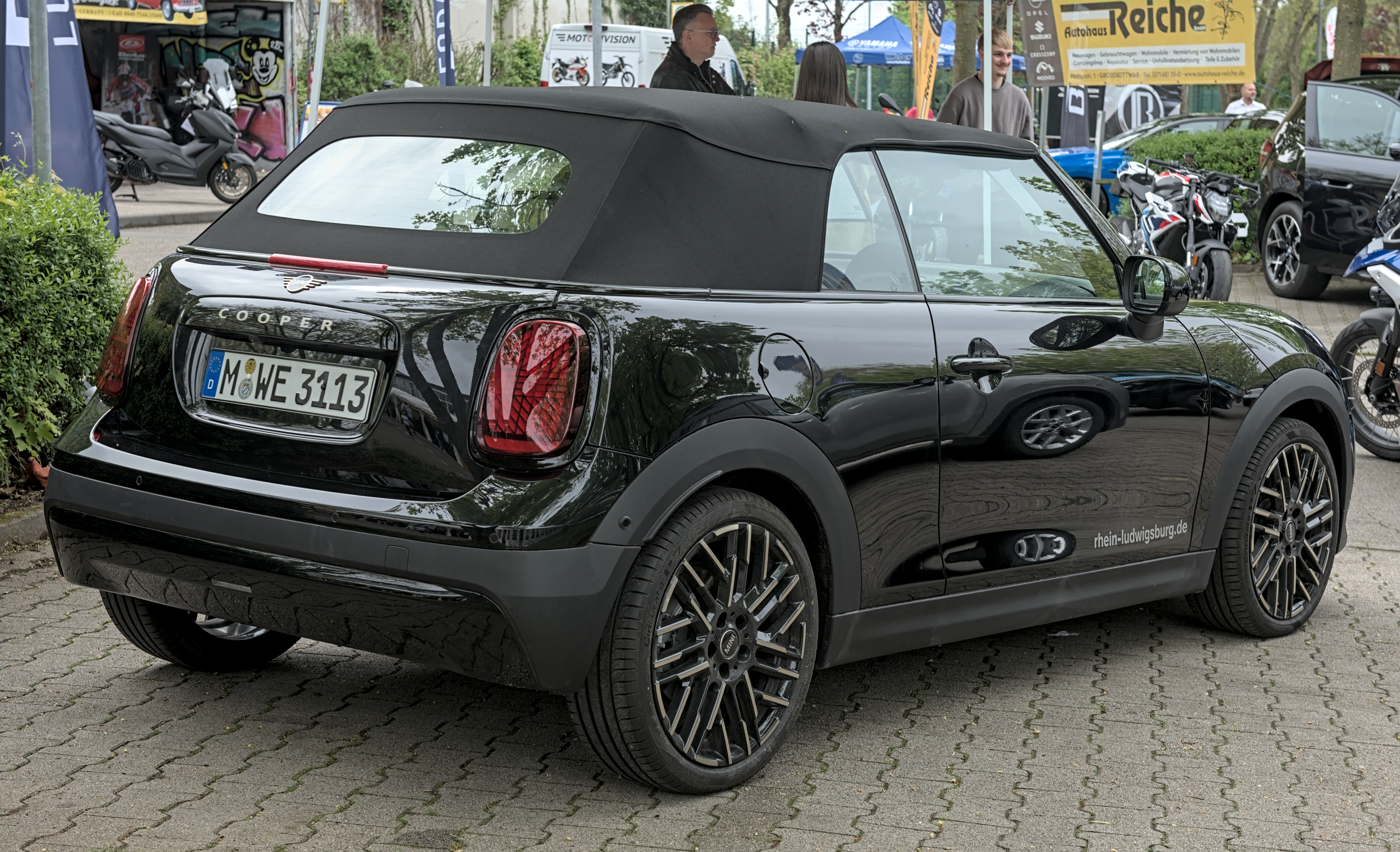
Rear View

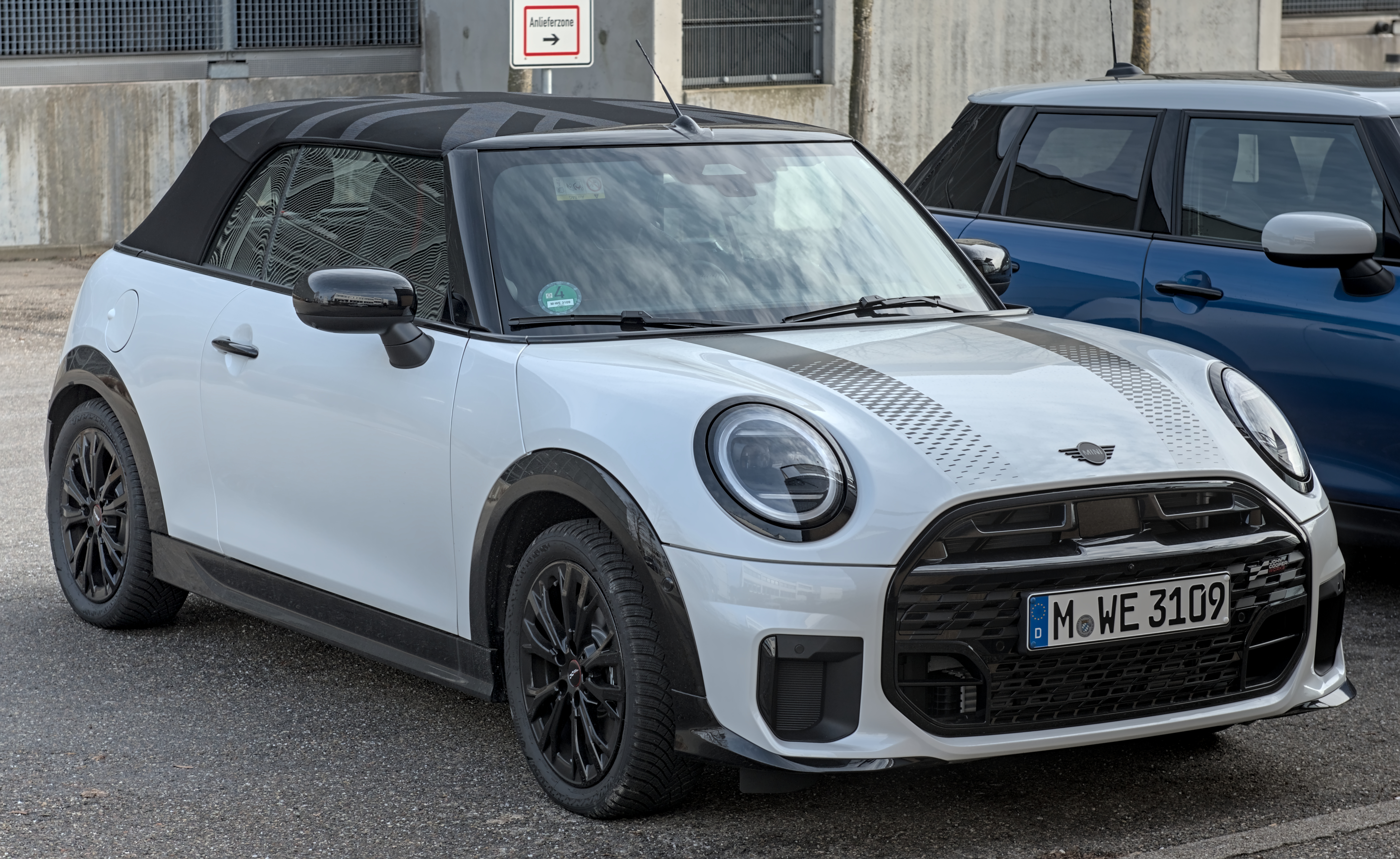
Mini Cooper S Convertible JCW-Style

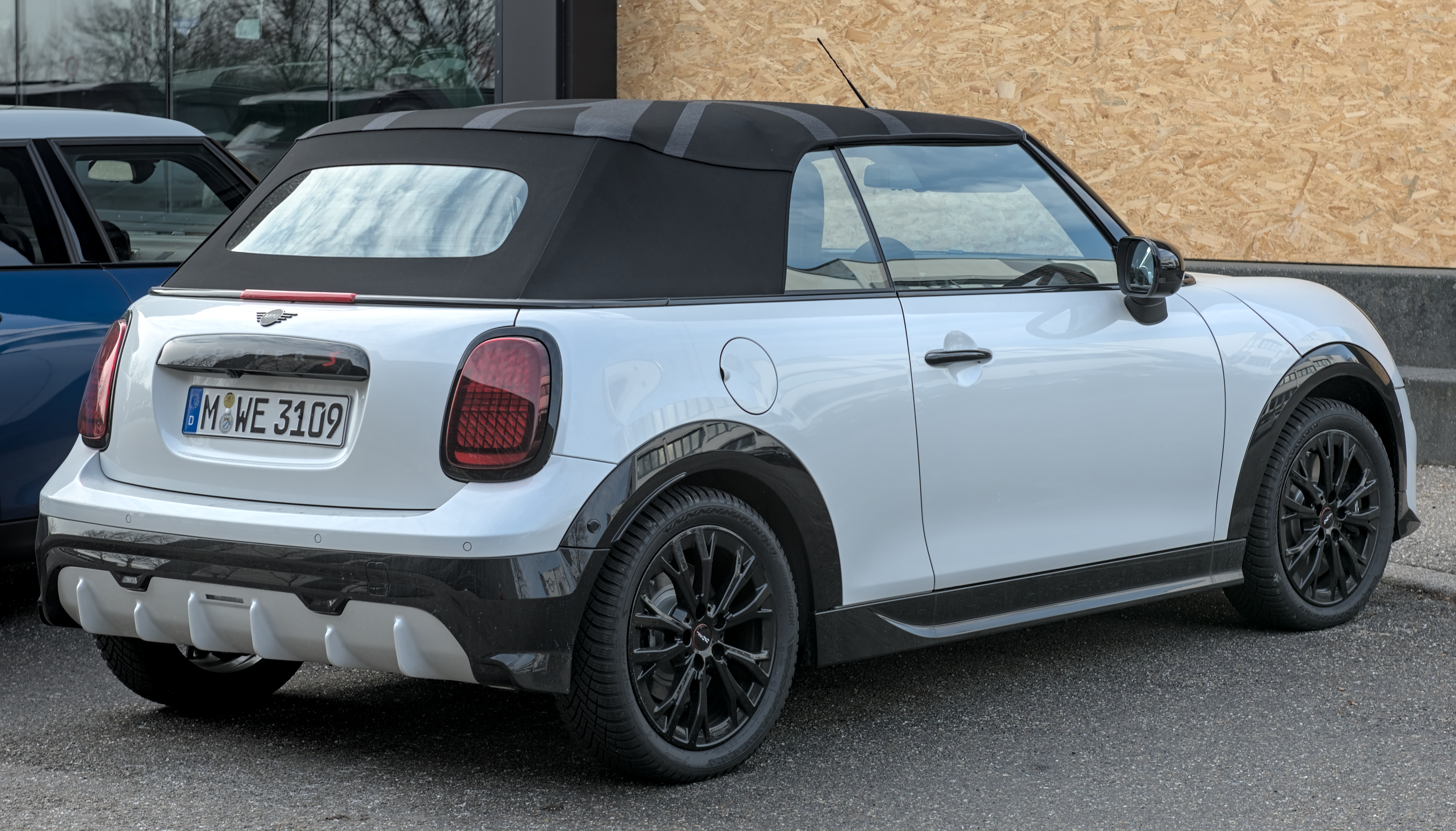
Rear View

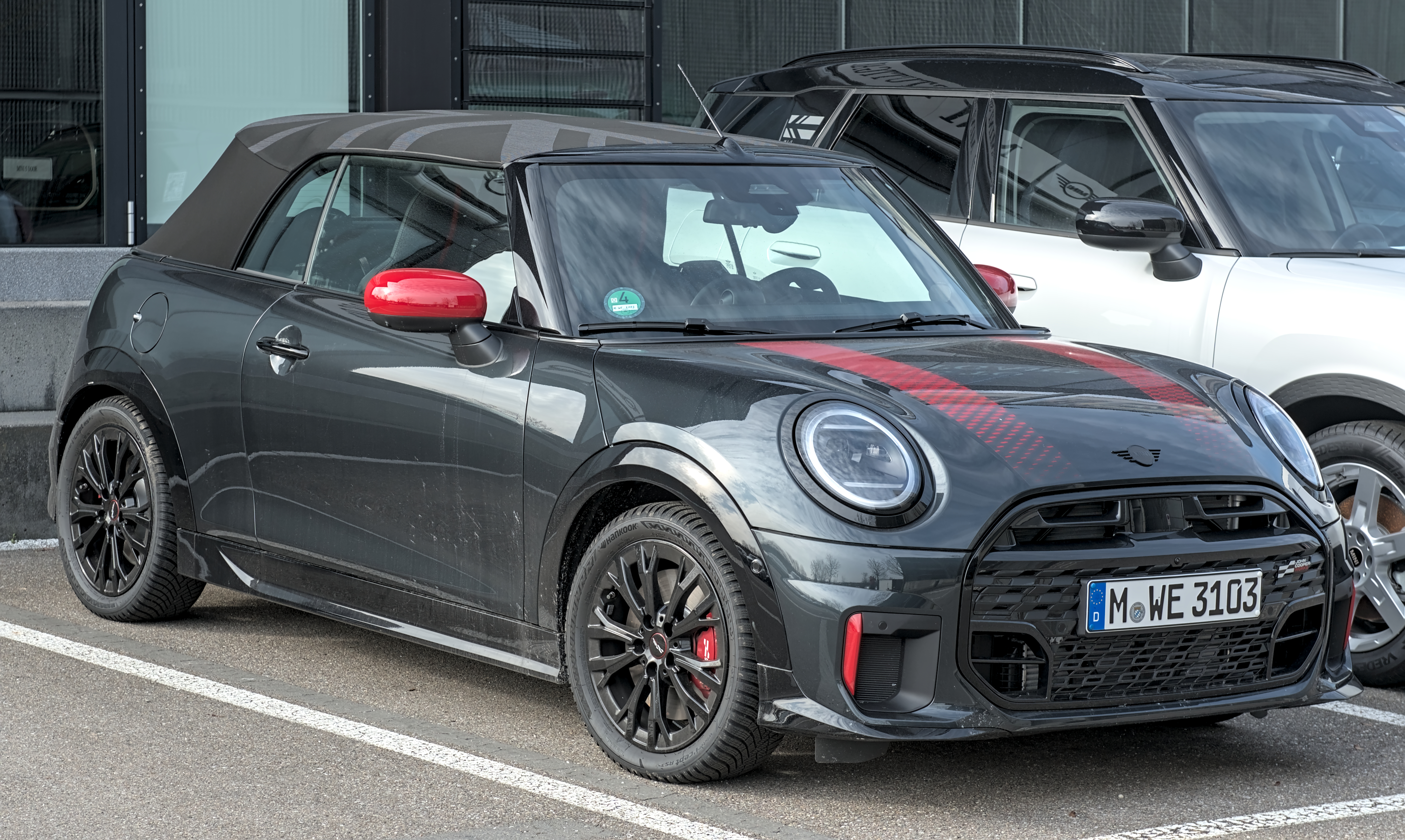
Mini Cooper Convertible JCW

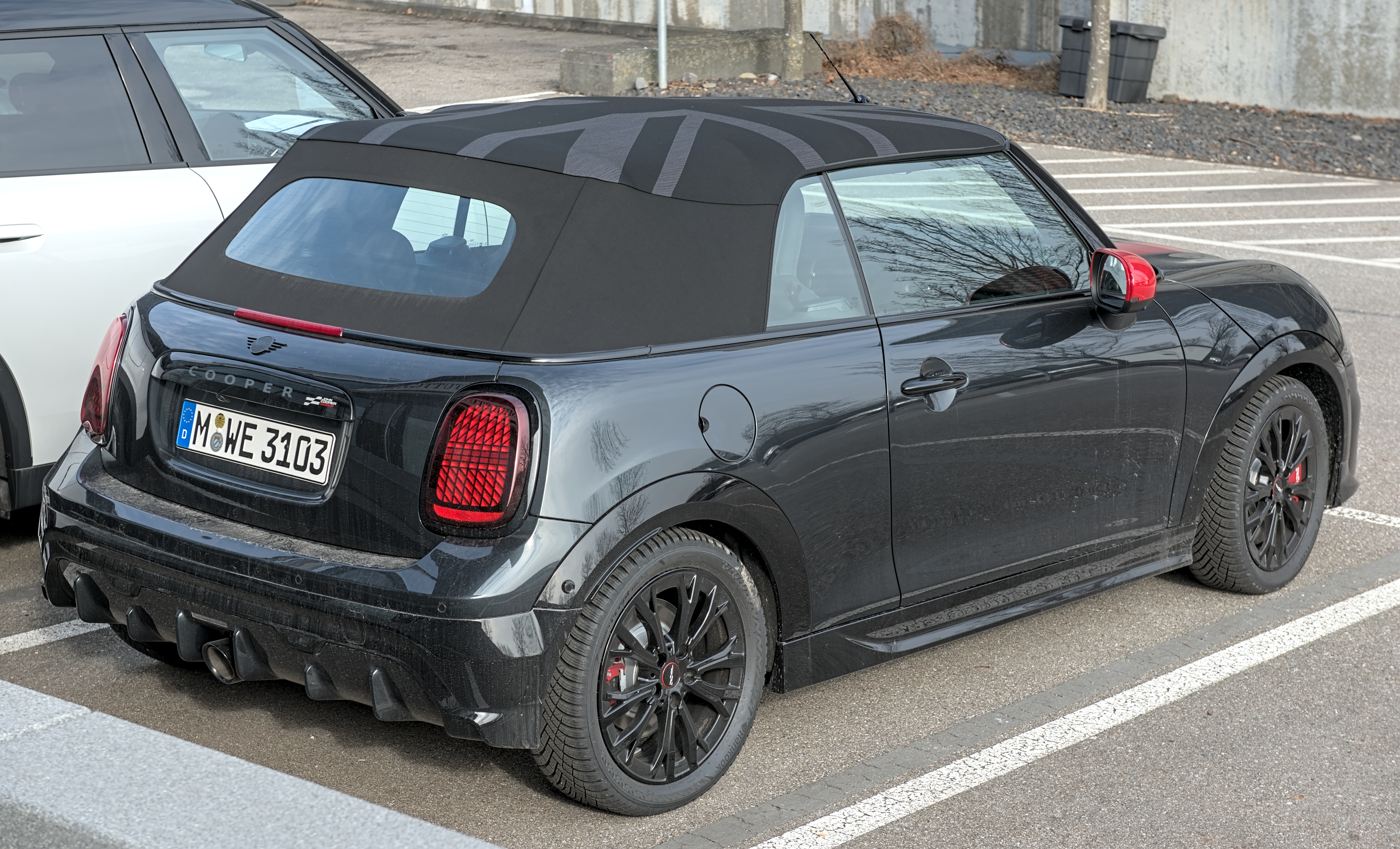
Rear View

=== Safety ===
==== Euro NCAP ====
Euro NCAP test results MINI Cooper C (LHD) (2025)
Test	Points	%
Overall:	5 /5 stars	
Adult occupant:	33.6	83%
Child occupant:	40.5	82%
Pedestrian:	51.3	81%
Safety assist:	13.9	77%

Euro NCAP test results MINI Cooper E (2025)
Test	Points	%
Overall:	5 /5 stars	
Adult occupant:	35.7	89%
Child occupant:	42.8	87%
Pedestrian:	49	77%
Safety assist:	14.4	79%

==== ANCAP ====
ANCAP test results Mini Cooper E (2025, aligned with Euro NCAP)
Test	Points	%
Overall:	5 /5 stars	
Adult occupant:	35.74	89%
Child occupant:	40.68	83%
Pedestrian:	49.01	77%
Safety assist:	15.06	83%

== Reception ==
The Mini Cooper/Cooper S (2001–2006) won the North American Car of the Year award in 2003. The car won the 2006 car of the year at the "Das Goldene Lenkrad" awards in Germany. MotorPress.ca awarded the F56 MINI JCW with their "Driver's Car Award" and "Top Pick" award giving it a rating of 8.3 out of 10, praising its driving characteristics and engine. Fifth Gear awarded the Cooper S their Best Small Car of 2006 award.

The Mini brand enjoyed paradoxically strong sales and customer loyalty in the US, while at the same time being rated worst for problems found in the JD Power survey. In 2009, Mini ranked last, 37 out of 37 brands, in the JD Power Initial Quality Survey, having landed second to last the previous year. The survey gives the same weight to problems from something being broken, and problems due to the car owner finding them difficult to use, unfamiliar, or confusing. The quirky controls found in Minis, such as non-standard windscreen wiper or interior lighting switches, were counted both as "problems" that hurt Mini's ranking in the Initial Quality Survey, and also as distinguishing "idiosyncrasies" that, over time, made owners grow to love the cars. This contributed to brand loyalty and relatively strong sales, and expanding the number of US Mini dealerships, in the midst of the 2008 recession and automotive industry crisis of 2008–10.

Consumer Reports ranked Mini as the least reliable car brand in 2013, saying that, "less-expensive European brands are having more problems", perhaps due to cost-cutting at the expense of reliability. In 2015, Consumer Reports awarded the 2006–2012 Mini Cooper S the title 'Worst Used Car', saying that while it was "cute and delightfully entertaining", the repair frequency was "heartbreaking" because the magazine's surveyed owners reported problems in the areas of "engine major, engine minor, engine cooling, fuel system, body integrity, and body hardware have issues at an alarming rate".

== Sales ==
Year	China					US
Year	Mini	JCW	Cabrio	Mini EV	EV JCW	Total
2022						20,015
2023	10,438	513	1,206	—	—	20,975
2024	7,905	—	—	5,859	—	14,652
2025	8,338	125	51	11,086	1,030	15,818
