= Mini Electric =

All-electric hatchback

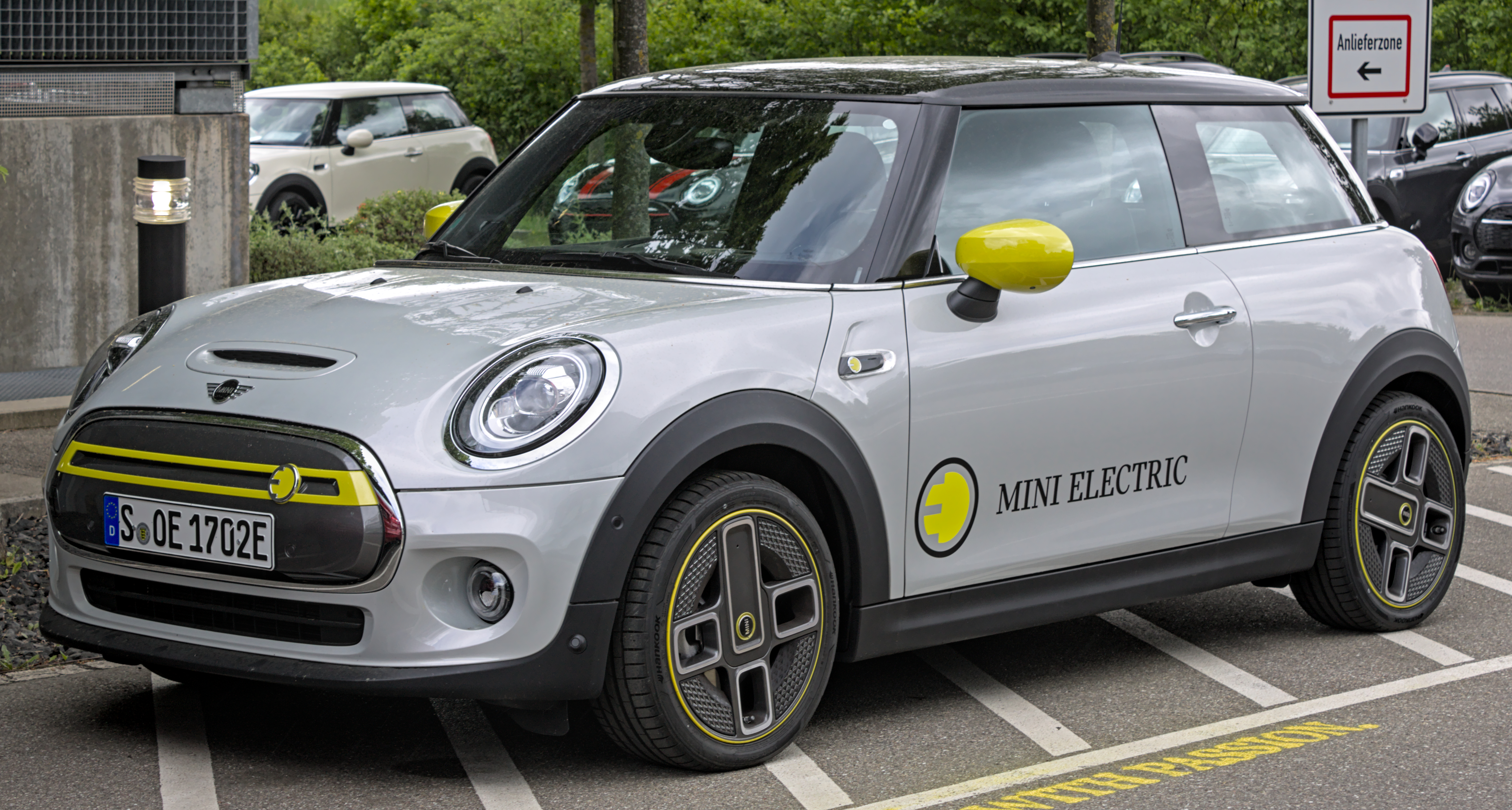
- Mini Electric (pre-facelift)

Overview
- Manufacturer: BMW
- Also called: Mini Cooper SE
- Production: 2019–2024
- Model years: 2020–2024
- Assembly: United Kingdom: Cowley (Plant Oxford)

Body and chassis
- Class: Subcompact/Supermini (B)
- Body style: 3-door hatchback; 2-door convertible (Limited 999 Units)
- Layout: Front-motor, front-wheel-drive
- Related: BMW i3

Powertrain
- Electric motor: 135 kW (181 hp) synchronous electric motor
- Transmission: Single speed with fixed ratio
- Battery: 32.6 kWh
- Electric range: 235 kilometres (144 miles WLTP)
- Plug-in charging: 11 kW on-board AC charger (CCS)

Dimensions
- Wheelbase: 2,495 mm (98.2 in)
- Length: 3,845 mm (151.4 in)
- Width: 1,727 mm (68.0 in)
- Height: 1,432 mm (56.4 in)
- Kerb weight: 1,365 kg (3,009 lb)

Chronology
- Predecessor: Mini E
- Successor: Mini Cooper Electric

The Mini Electric (marketed as the Mini Cooper SE in all markets outside the United Kingdom) is a battery electric version of the third generation Mini Hatch that was launched in 2020 by German automaker BMW under the Mini marque. The drivetrain utilises technology developed for the earlier BMW i3.

== Design ==
The traction motor has an output of 135 kW (181 hp) and 270 N⋅m (199 lb⋅ft) of torque, drawing from a 32.6 kWh battery, of which 28.9 kWh are usable. The battery uses twelve packs of lithium-ion cells arranged in a T-shape between the front seats and below the rear seats. It has an EPA rated range of 110 mi (180 km) on a single charge, with a 36-minute fast charging time to 80% capacity using a 50 kW DC fast charger. According to the WLTP test cycle, the car has a range of 225 to 234 km (140 to 145 mi).

Compared to the Mini E, a limited production battery-electric vehicle leased by Mini to a few hundred customers in the United States in 2008, the acceleration, power, and range were nearly the same, but the battery in the newer Mini Electric takes up less passenger volume; the battery of the Mini E occupied the entire rear seat and cargo area.

The chassis position of the battery shifts the weight balance from 63/37 (front/rear) for a Cooper S with an internal combustion engine to 58/42 or 54/46 (F/R) for a Cooper SE; in addition, the center of gravity is 30 mm (1.2 in) lower for the SE, despite an increase in ride height by 18 mm (0.71 in). The chassis was fitted with unique dampers; springs were borrowed from the Countryman and Clubman models to accommodate the extra weight of the battery, which increased weight by 129 to 159 kg (284 to 350 lb) compared to a base Cooper.

The top speed of the Mini Electric is limited to 150 km/h (93 mph). The Mini Electric has a luggage capacity ranging between 211 and 731 litres, depending on how many seats are used.

=== Styling ===
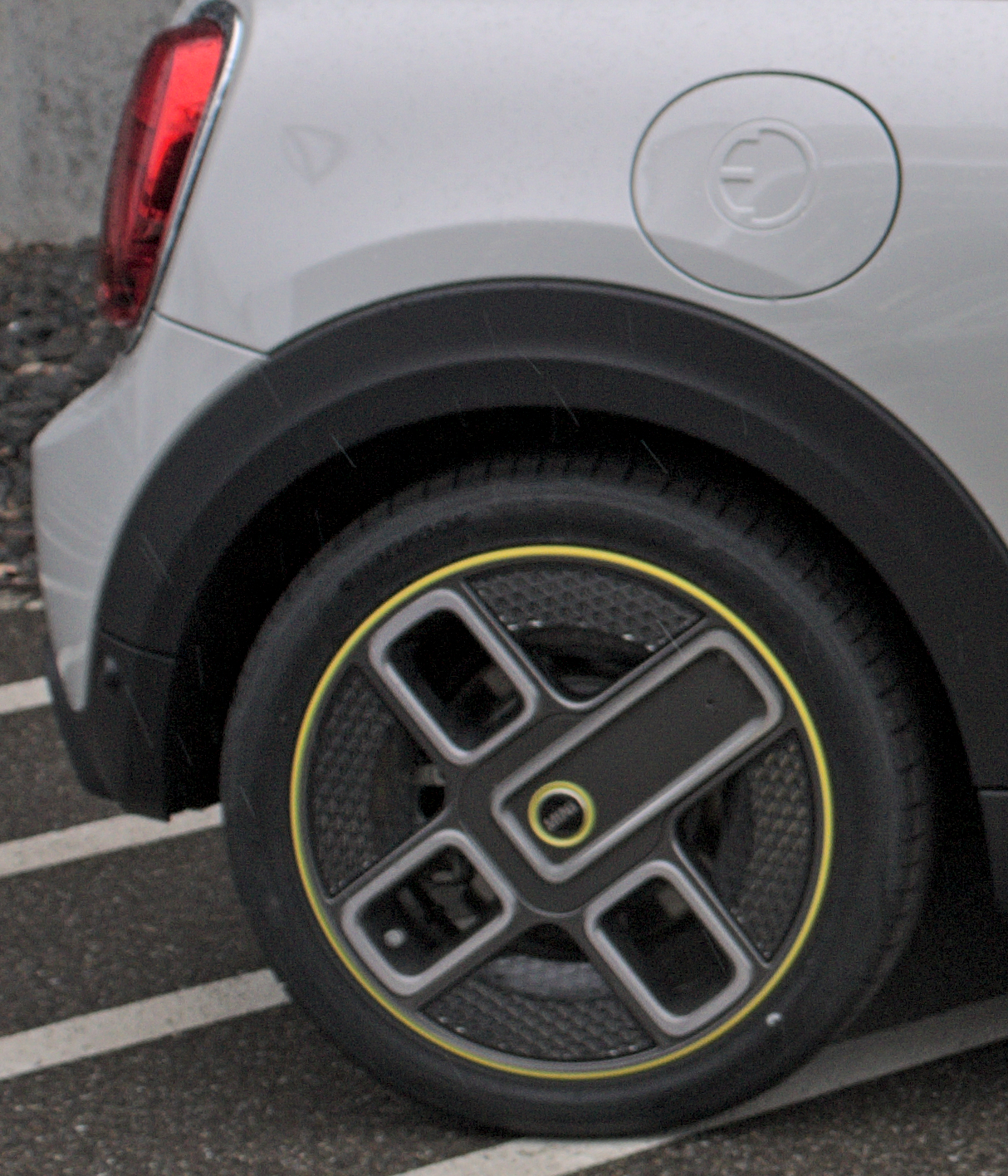
Styling details: "Corona/Power Spoke" wheels and the E/plug ambigram embossed on the charge port door

Because the car does not require a radiator, the grille is closed; additional tweaks to the undercarriage and rear apron were made to reduce aerodynamic drag. Certain badges and trim of the Mini Electric are finished in a bright "Energetic Yellow" colour, which may be specified in grey instead. Inside the car, the digital instrument display, shifter, and starter button are highlighted with the same yellow colour. The charging inlet is located behind the fuel filler door and is regionalised: Type 2/CCS Combo 2 in Europe and Type 1/CCS Combo 1 in North America.

One of the model-specific wheel options, initially branded "Corona Spoke", has a three-hole asymmetric design reminiscent of three-pin BS 1363 household mains sockets in the United Kingdom; the name was updated to "Power Spoke" shortly after the COVID-19 pandemic began. The Mini Electric continues to use the round stylised "E"/plug logo first developed for the Mini E and continued on the Countryman Cooper S E Hybrid.

A facelifted version of the Mini Cooper was unveiled in 2021, reducing the use of bright yellow trim and badges.

== History ==
The Mini Electric should not be confused with the 2010 Mini E which was a limited production vehicle used as a technology and market test platform.

The Mini Electric was previewed by a concept car, the Mini Electric Concept at the 2017 Frankfurt IAA. The production Mini Cooper SE was announced in July 2019 and the international launch was held six months later in Miami, where BMW touted the fleet of press cars would be charged using renewable sources of energy.

The Mini Electric is assembled at Plant Oxford alongside conventionally-powered Mini hatchbacks. At launch, the factory could build up to 120 Mini Electric vehicles per day, and already had 2,000 preorders for the UK market. In the UK, the Mini Electric was offered in one of three different trim levels, with suggested retail prices ranging from £27,900 (for the "Level 1" trim) to £29,900 (Level 2) and £33,900 (Level 3). The corresponding trim levels and prices in the US were "Signature" (US$30,750), "Signature Plus" (US$34,750), and "Iconic" (US$37,750). In 2020 17,580 Cooper SE were sold worldwide.

The "MINI Electric Pacesetter inspired by JCW" was unveiled in March 2021; it functioned as the safety car for the 2020–21 Formula E World Championship. Compared to the roadgoing Mini Electric, the Pacesetter underwent a weight reduction of 130 kg (286 lb) and featured new wheels and a rear wing with integrated safety lights.

In 2021, Paul Smith designed the MINI STRIP, a version of the Mini Electric which shows sustainable ideas, for example a panoramic roof and car mats by remanufactured materials as well as cork in the interior.

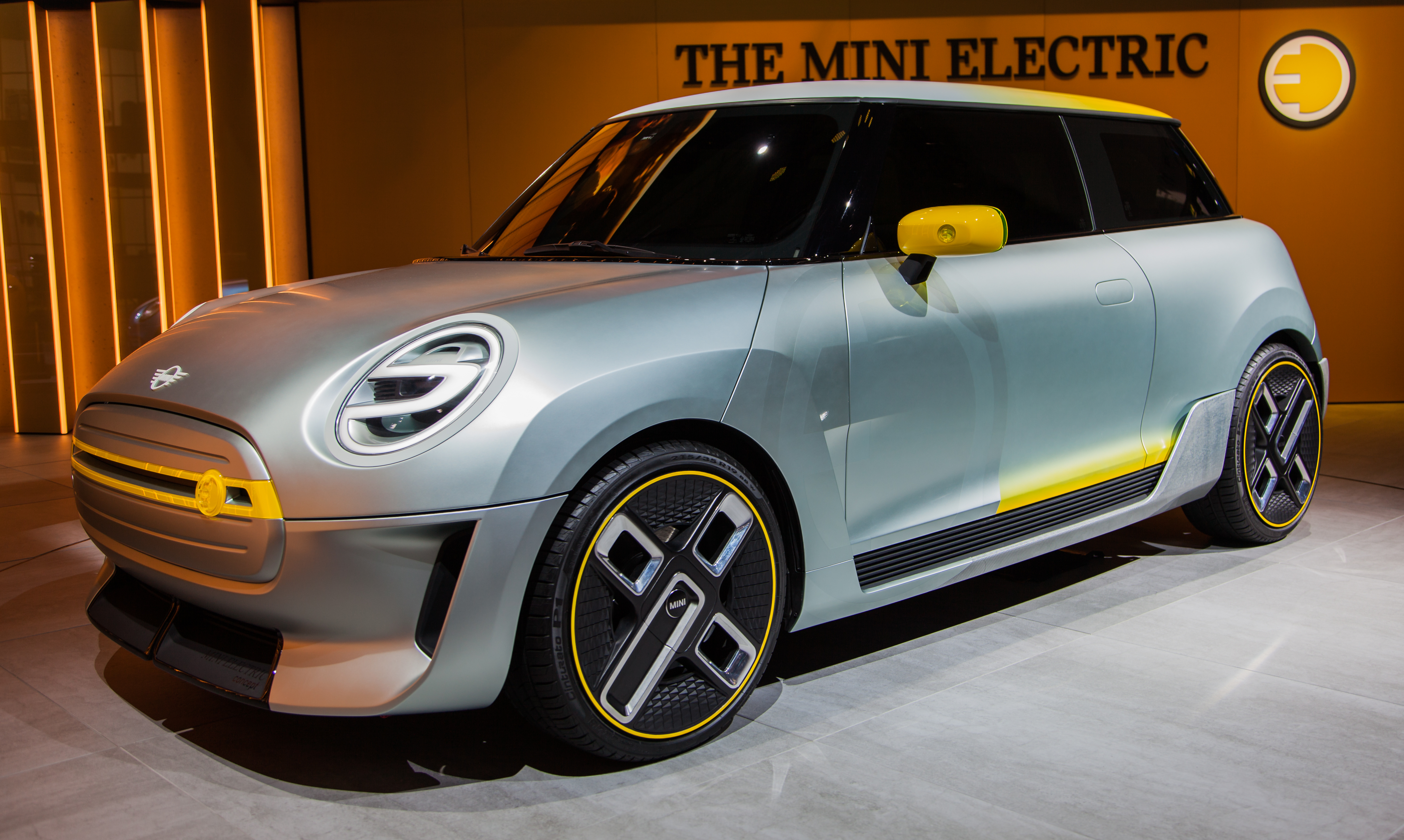
Mini Electric Concept at IAA 2017

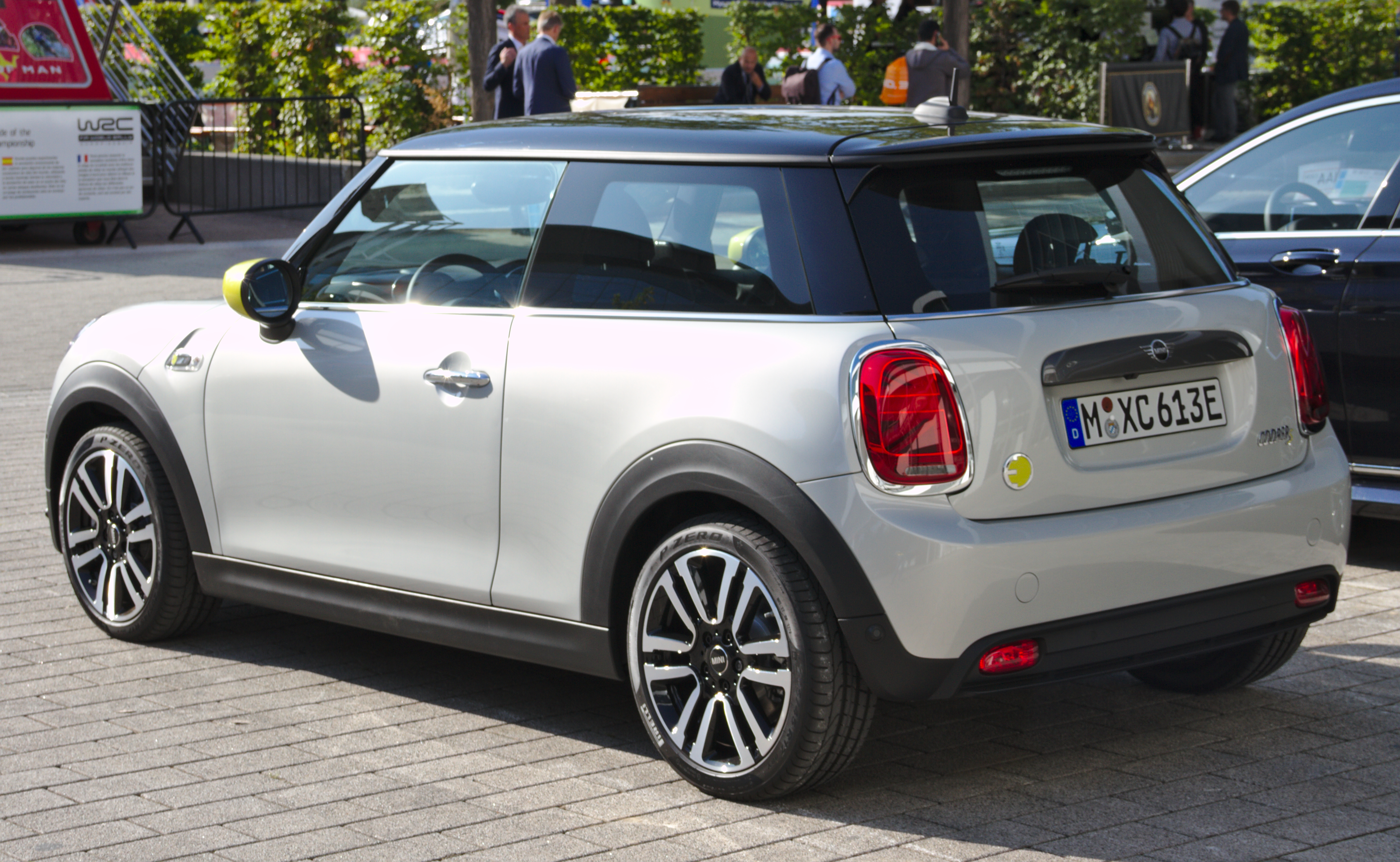
Rear view (pre-facelift)

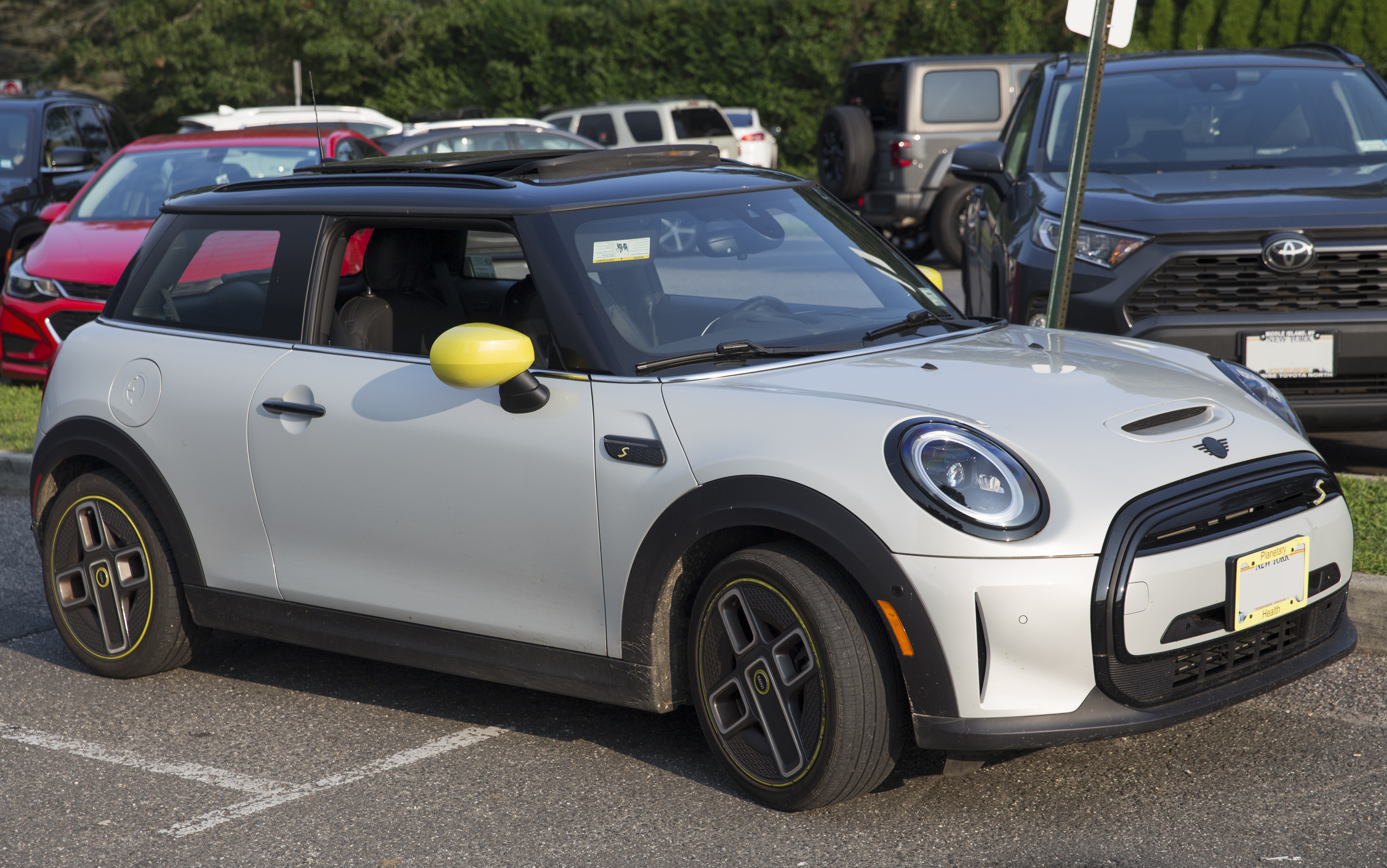
Mini Cooper SE (facelift)

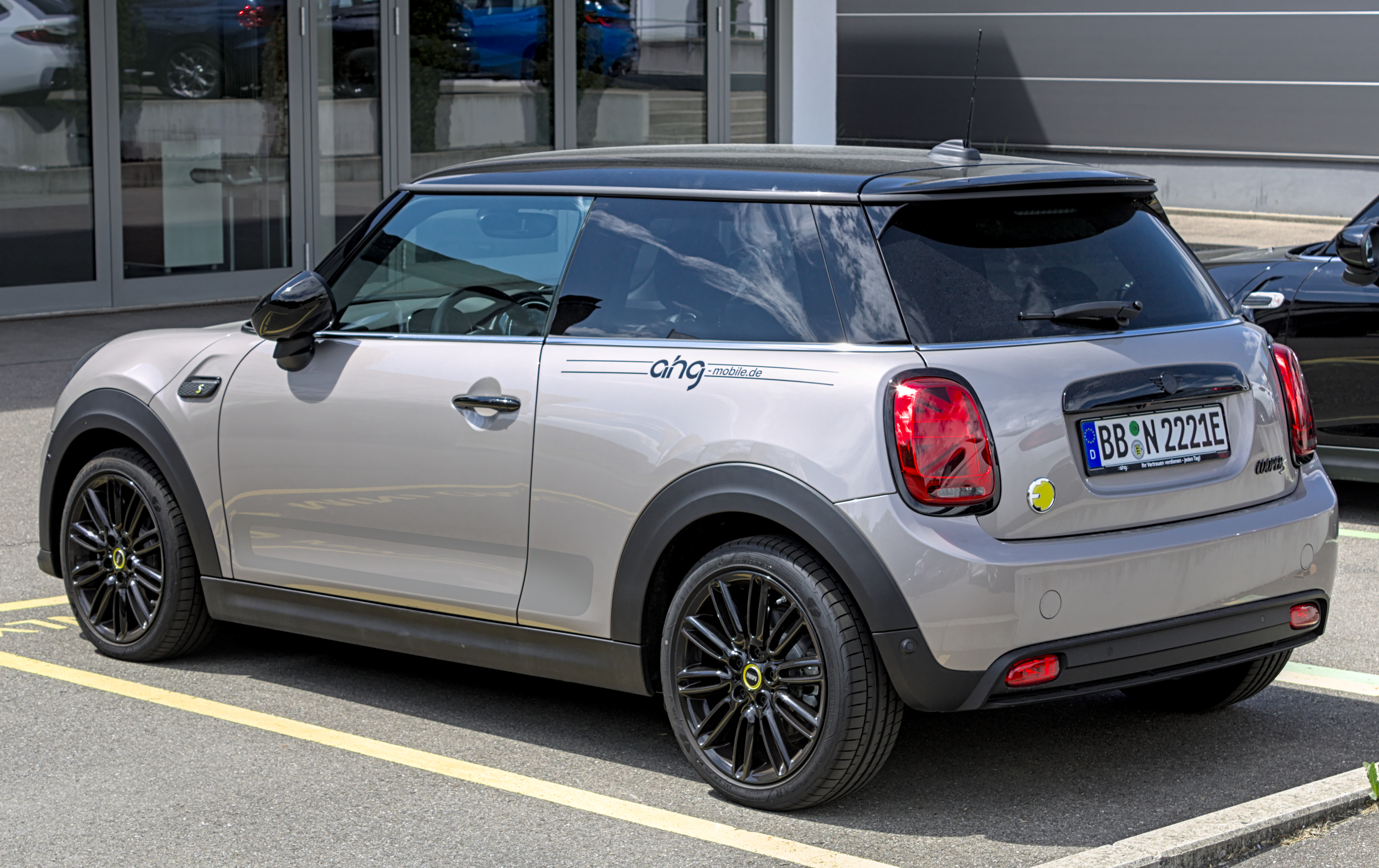
Rear view (facelift)

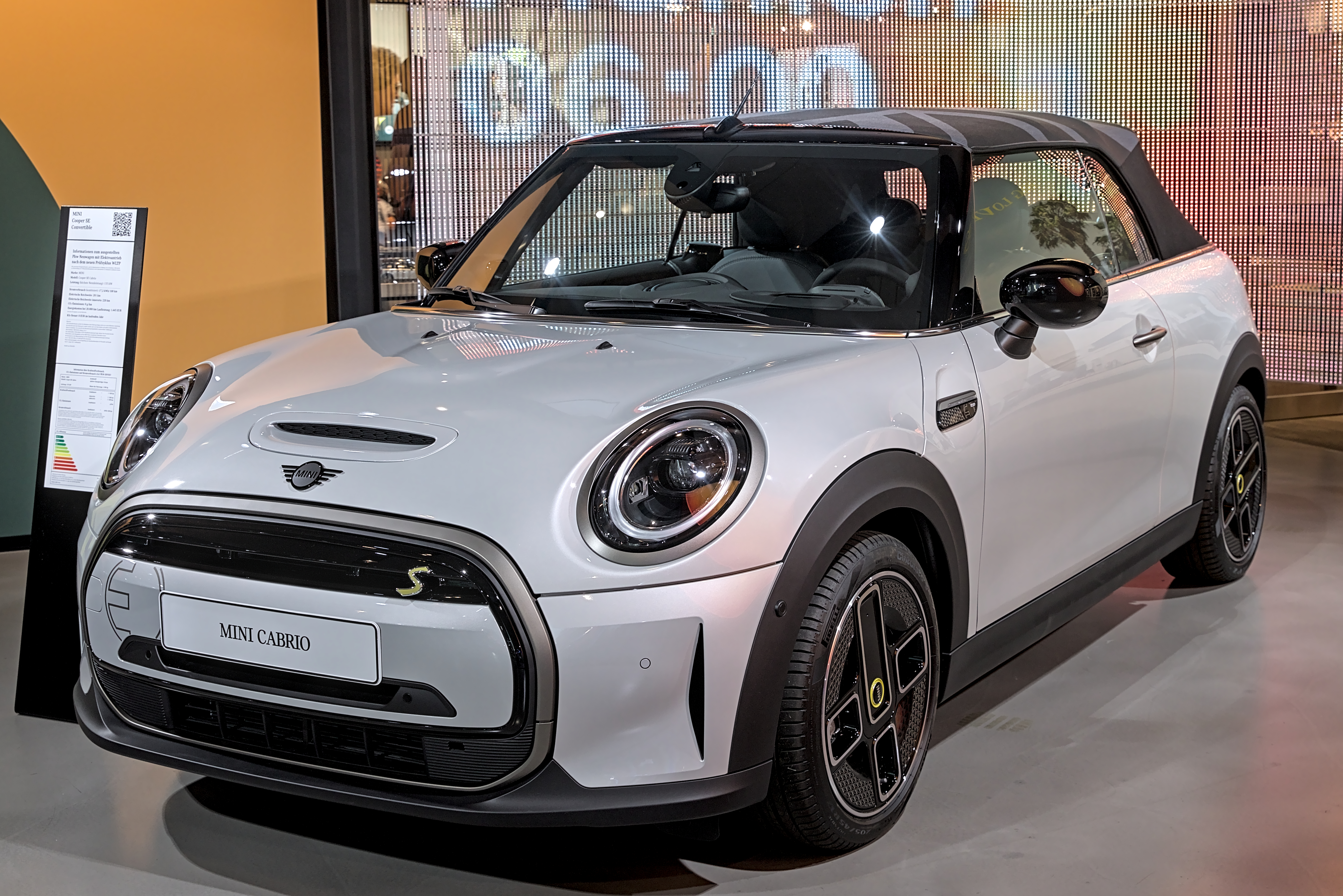
Mini Cooper SE (convertible)

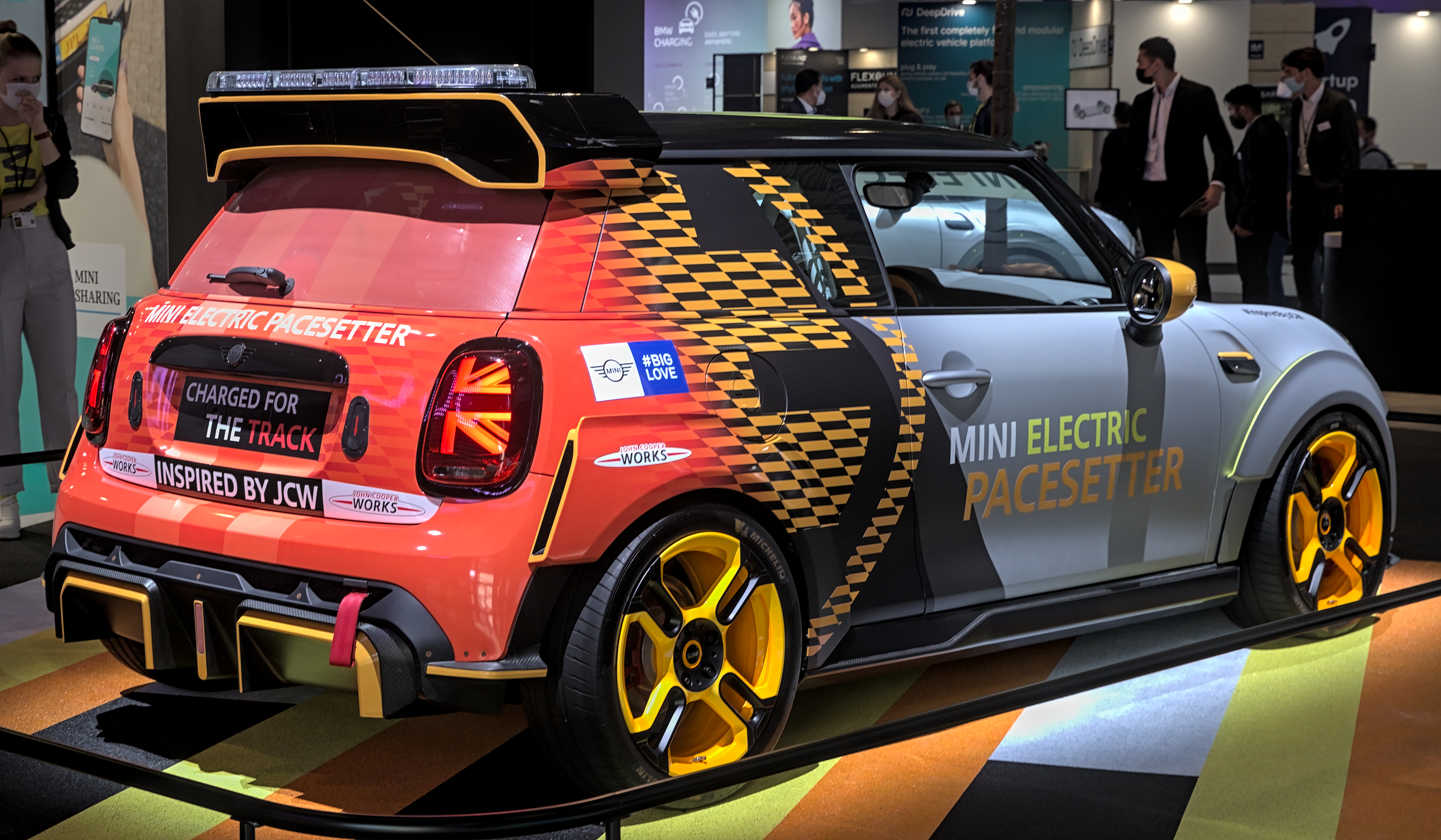
Electric Pacesetter, 2021

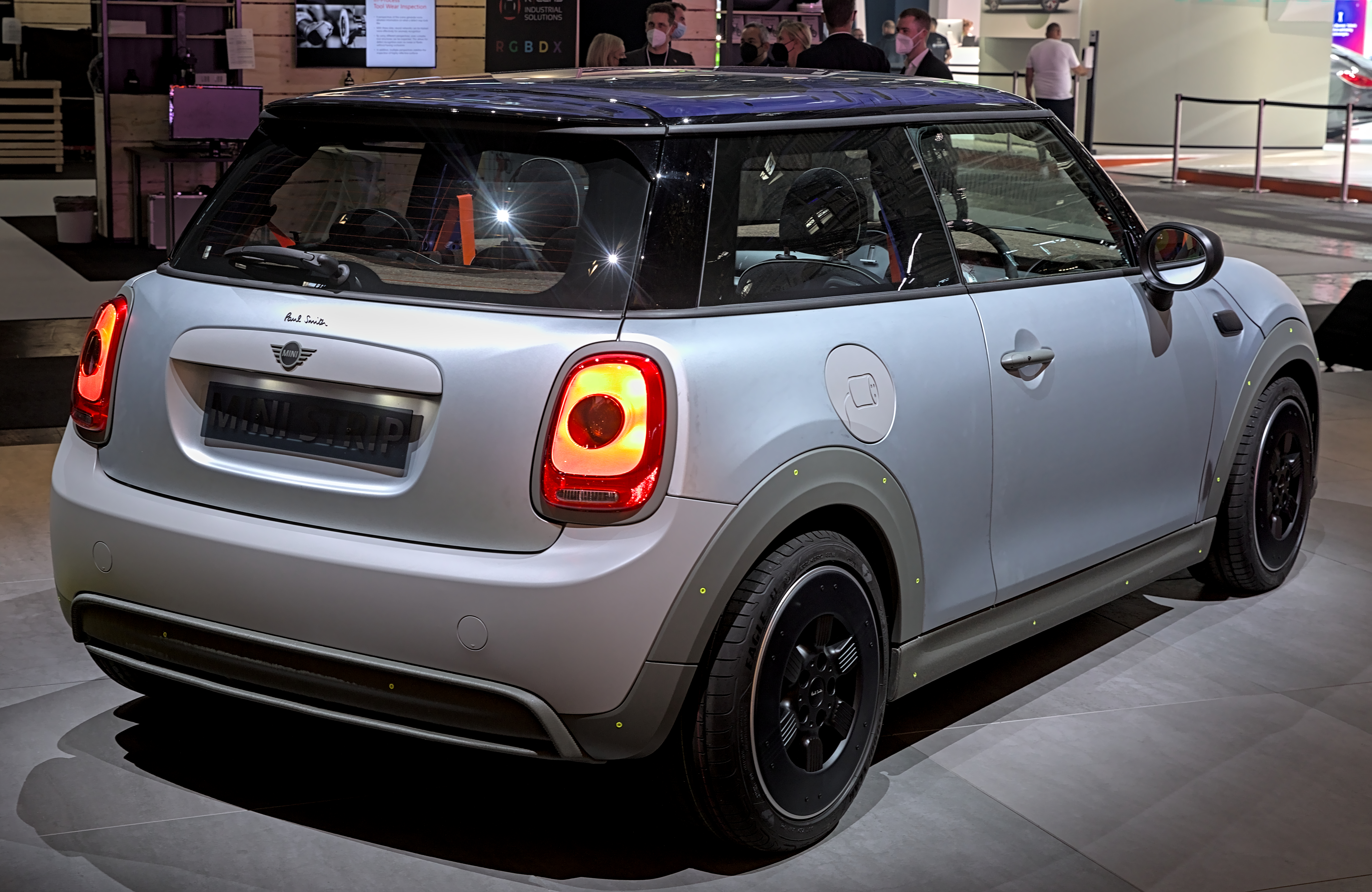
Mini Strip by Paul Smith, 2021

== Reception ==
In 2021, the UK magazine CAR noted "the ride is firm ... the Mini fidgets and fusses more than we'd like; ... [the steering] tugs about lumpily under heavy acceleration and there's a surprising dead spot on the straight and narrow", noting the Mini "is largely indistinguishable from its combustion-engined compatriots" but "you can get the same range for less, more range for a similar price or a generally far more interesting car" from competitors on the British market. Motor Trend echoed CAR: "I can't recommend the Cooper SE ... It is not the confidence-inspiring electric hot hatch I had anticipated. Instead, it's a style-over-substance, disappointing glimpse at how great an electric Mini could be."

In a three-way comparison test with the Honda e and Peugeot e-208 conducted by CAR in 2020, the Mini Electric finished third. The reviewer noted the Mini was "comfortably the quickest car here — but what surprised us more was how it lacked the sophistication of the others" and called the range "desperately short".

In contrast, the US magazine Car and Driver said that if "you don't need to drive 200 miles on a charge and ... you enjoy driving ... this might be the best electric way to get you there." Technology site CNET compared the Cooper SE with the Mazda MX-30 in 2021, noting that while the interior dimensions and driving range were comparable, "the MX-30 is unpleasant to use and dull to drive. Every time one of us gets into the Cooper SE, it makes us happy. The Mazda, on the other hand, feels like a bore."

== Competitors ==
- Honda e
- Hyundai Ioniq
- Mazda MX-30
- Nissan Leaf
- Peugeot e-208
- Renault Zoe
- MG4 EV
- Dacia Spring
