= B-segment =

Car size classification

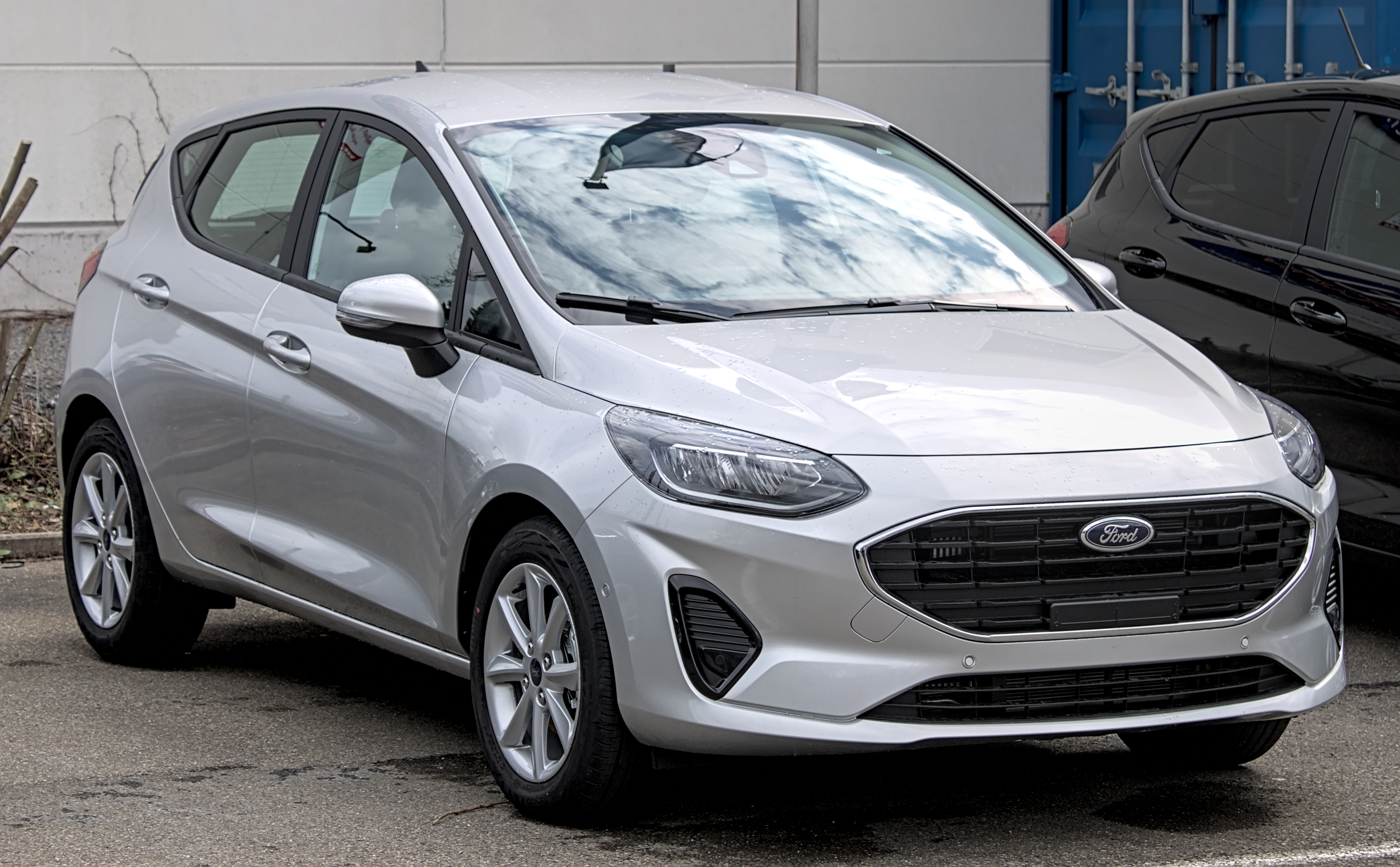
Ford Fiesta hatchback

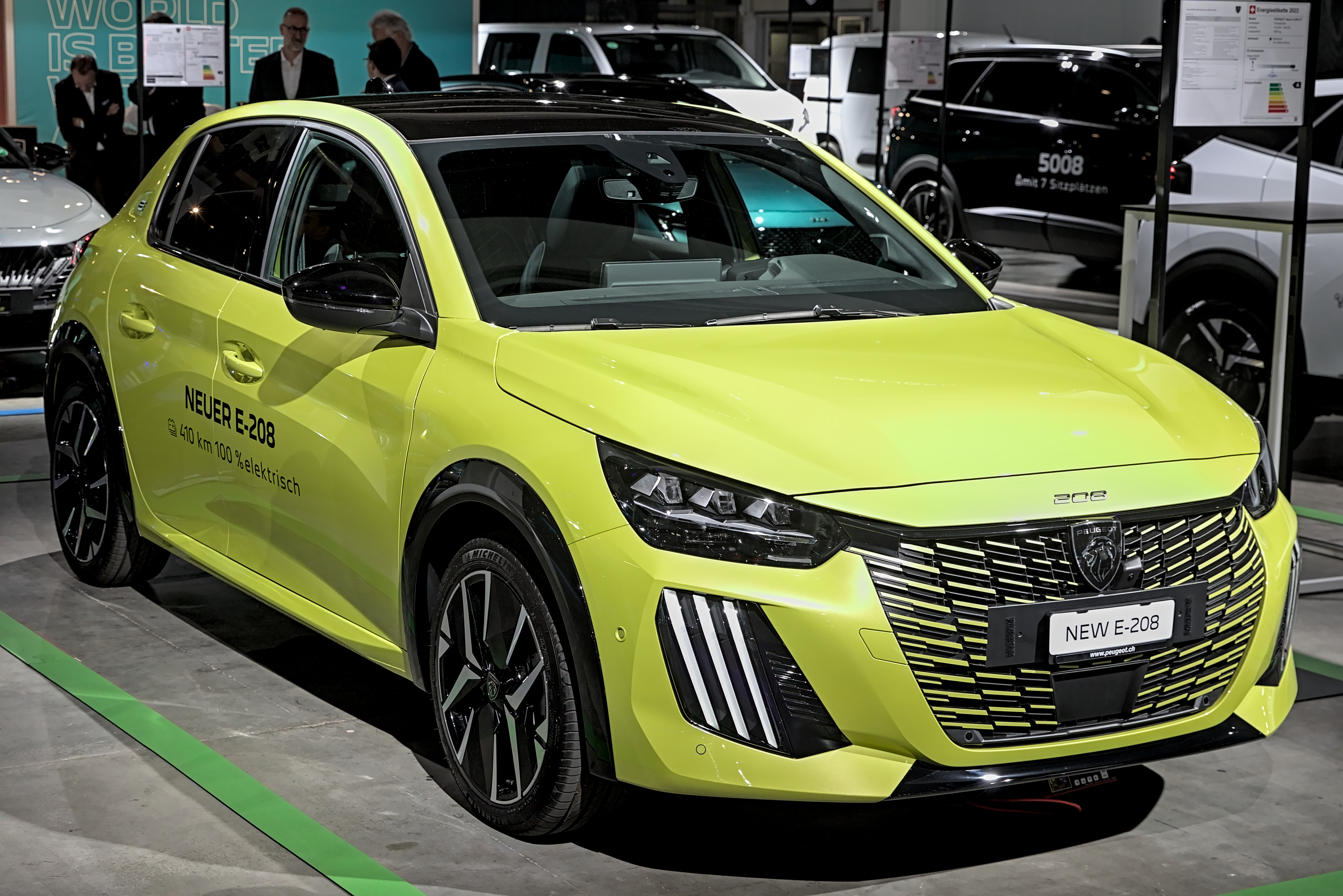
Peugeot e-208 hatchback

The B-segment is the second smallest of the European segments for passenger cars between the A-segment and C-segment, and commonly described as "small cars". The B-segment is the third largest segment in Europe by sales volume, accounting for 15.5% percent of total car sales in 2024 according to JATO Dynamics. B-segment cars include hatchback, saloon, estate, coupe/convertible, MPV, and crossover/SUV body styles.

The B-segment is considered as the European equivalent to the subcompact category widely known in North America, the A0-class in China, and the supermini category for B-segment hatchbacks in Great Britain.

== Definition ==
The European segments are not based on size or weight criteria. In practice, B-segment cars have been described as having a length of approximately 3.7–4.2 m (146–165 in), and may vary depending on the body styles, markets, and era. In some cases, the same car may be differently positioned depending on the market.

The Euro NCAP vehicle class called "Supermini" also includes smaller A-segment cars alongside B-segment cars.

In Britain, the term "supermini" is more widely used for B-segment hatchbacks. The term was developed in the 1970s as an informal categorisation, and by 1977 was used regularly by the British newspaper The Times. By the mid-1980s, it had widespread use in Britain.

In Germany, the term "small cars" (German: Kleinwagen) has been endorsed by the Federal Motor Transport Authority as equivalent to the B-segment. The segment accounts for 15.1 percent of total car registrations in the country in 2020.

== History ==
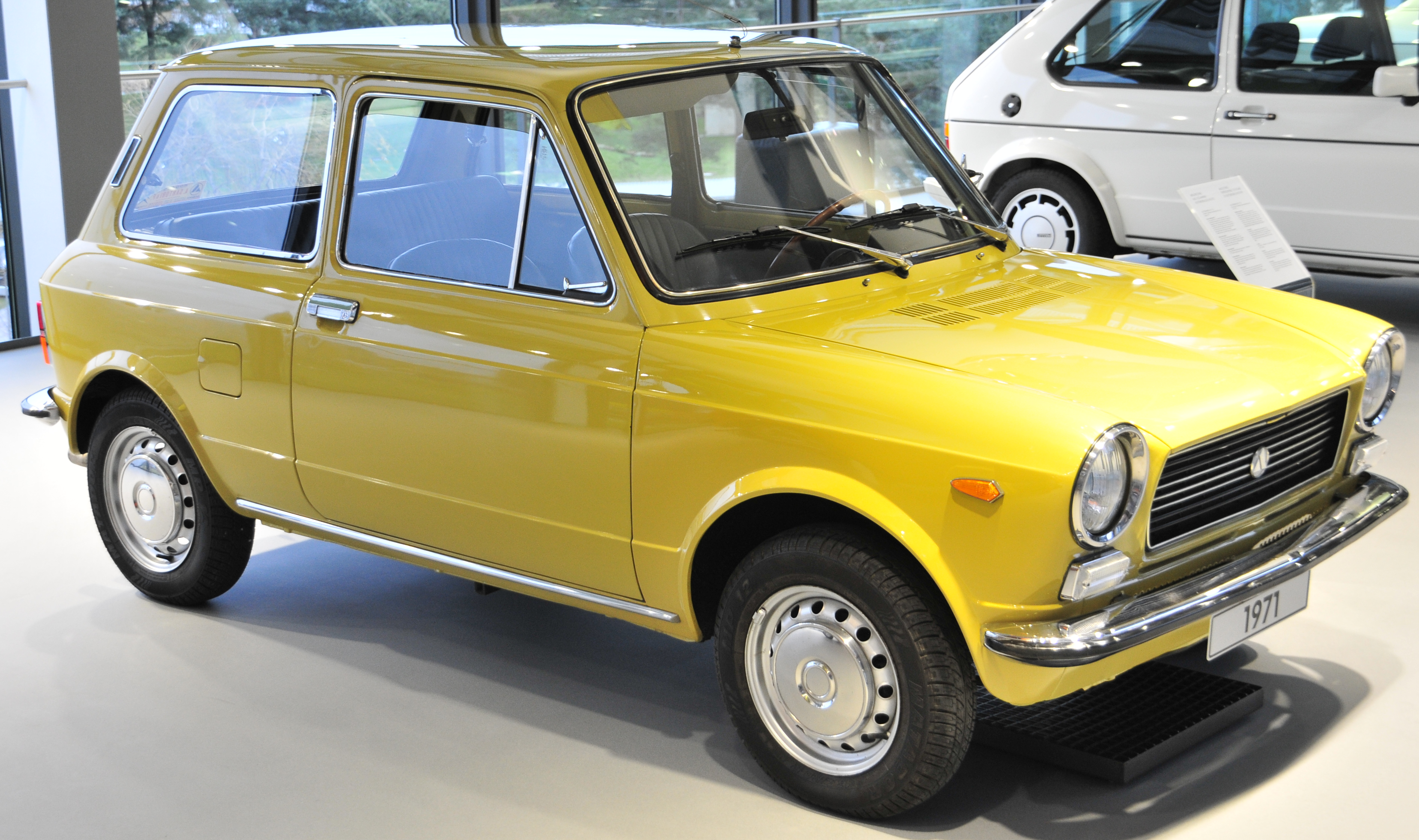
The Autobianchi A112 has been regarded as the pioneer of supermini, predating the "B-segment" term.

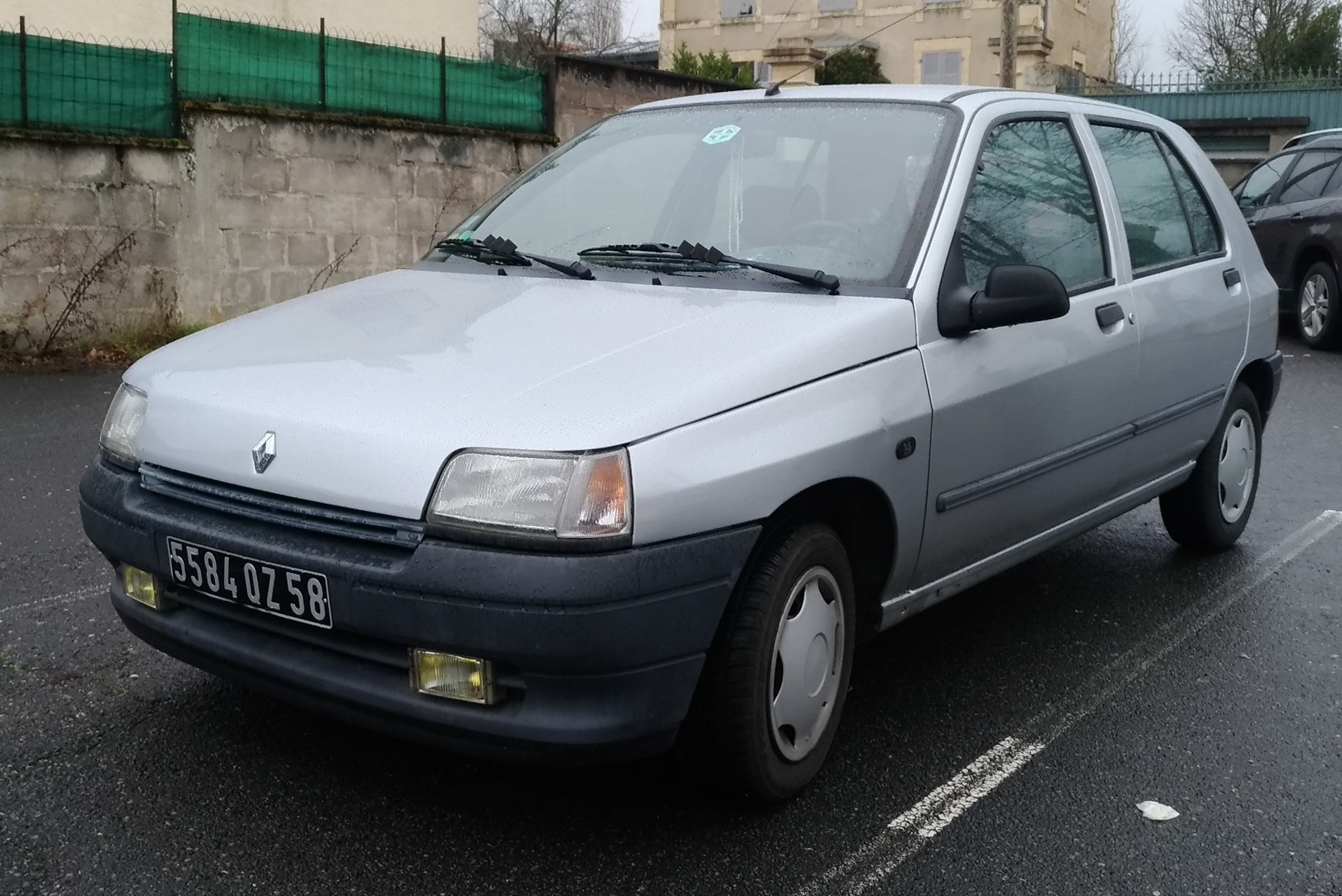
1990–1998 Renault Clio I

The term supermini, which precedes the B-segment term, emerged in the UK in the 1970s, as car manufacturers sought a new design to surpass the influential Mini, launched in 1959, and journalists attempted to categorise such a vehicle. The car which is widely regarded as the first modern supermini is the Autobianchi A112, launched in 1969. It was later followed by the Fiat 127, Renault 5, VW Polo and Honda Civic, which are similar in concept and size.

These supermini or B-segment cars were considered to feature better comfort and convenience, with the safety and surefootedness of the Mini's front-wheel drive/transverse engine package. That meant the addition of a hatchback and folding rear seats. The oil crisis in the 1970s was also argued to increase supermini market share.

In 1976, Ford launched the Ford Fiesta which became popular. The segment began to be more popular in the 1980s. By the mid-1980s, the term supermini had become established as a formal car classification term, eventually being adopted in European Commission classification as the B-segment.

The 1990 Renault Clio and 1983 Fiat Uno were significant models in the supermini or the B-segment, being the recipients of the European Car of the Year award. The Clio replaced the long-running Renault 5, although the latter remained in production until 1996. In 1993, the Nissan Micra (K11), became the first Japanese car company to be receive the European Car of the Year award. In 1999, the Toyota Yaris received the European Car of the Year award, and was noted for its high roof which allowed for improved interior space. Another notable model is the Opel Corsa, which was the best-selling car in the world in the year 1998 thanks to its extensive international presence. It recorded a global sales of 910,839 units that year, in which 54 percent was contributed by its European sales. It took the world number one spot from the Toyota Corolla at 906,953 sales.

=== Safety and performance ===
Safety features have improved for the cars in the segment. In 1995, both petrol and diesel B-segment vehicles had only around 40 percent of the listed safety options installed (side impact bars, driver/passenger airbag, side airbag, ABS, electronic braking system, stability control), whereas by 2010 they were averaging over 90 percent. This represents a significant improvement in vehicle safety over the period, despite petrol and diesel B-segment vehicles averaging an inflation-adjusted price increase of 6 percent and 15 percent respectively.

Studies from the European Union and JATO has found that the average maximum power output of B-segment vehicles has increased by 40 percent between 1995 and 2010, while the average overall vehicle weight only increased by around 20 percent in the same period. Fuel consumption has decreased by around 20 percent, and power-to-weight ratio has increased by 15 percent.

== Body styles ==
Hatchback is the most popular body style for the segment. While the majority is equipped with five doors, many European-oriented hatchbacks were offered with both three-door and five-door versions, with 31 percent of European customers opting for three-door B-segment hatchbacks by 2007. The share has decreased to 13 percent in 2016 due to the shift of market preference which is moving towards prioritizing usability and practicality. As the result, by late 2010s, a number of manufacturers had stopped offering three-door versions of its B-segment hatchback models in Europe.

Other body styles currently available in the segment in Europe are saloon (example: Dacia Logan), estate (example: Dacia Logan MCV and Škoda Fabia Combi), and coupe/convertible (example: Mini Cooper Cabrio/Convertible).

=== Hot hatch ===
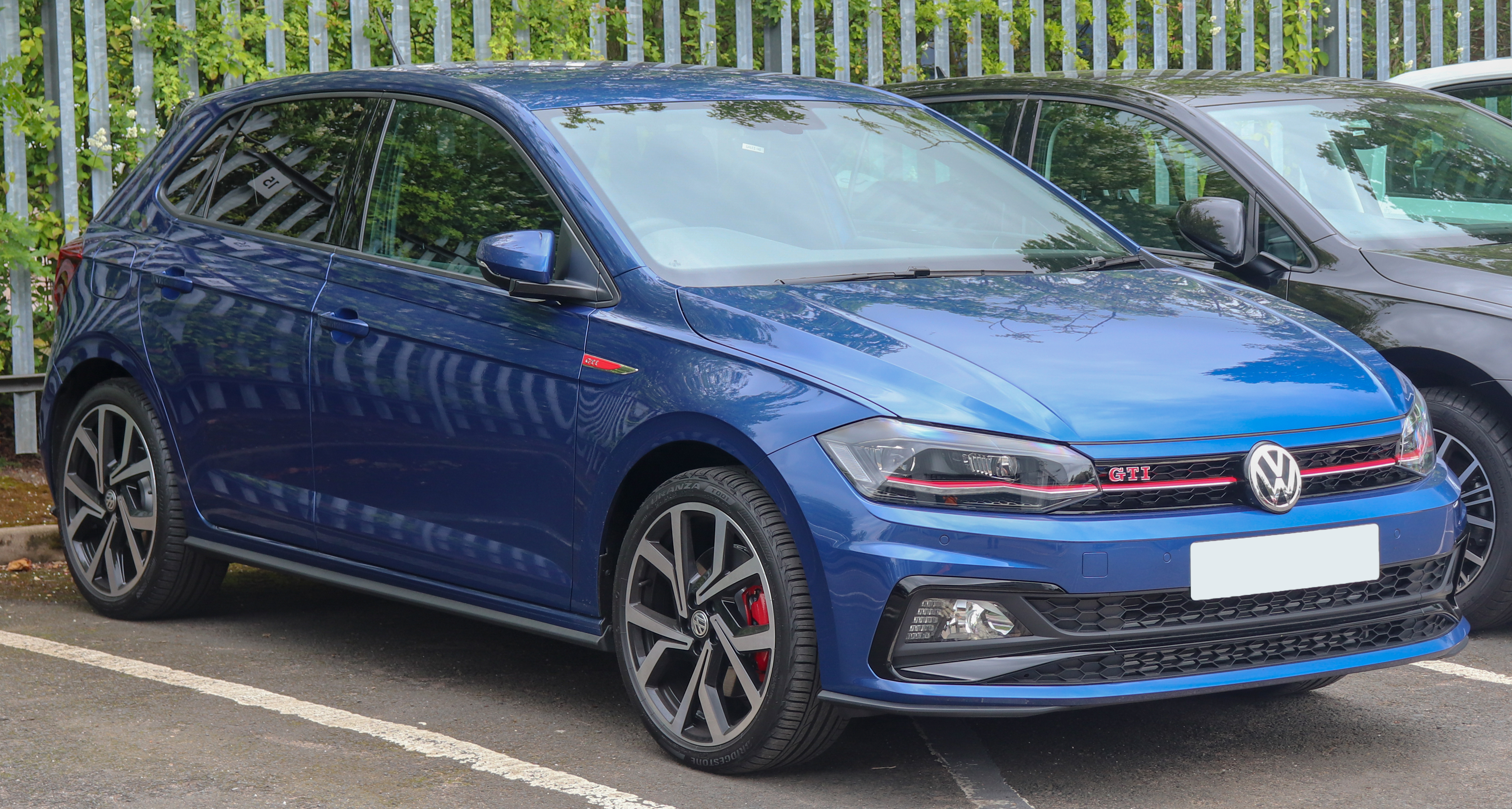
Volkswagen Polo GTI

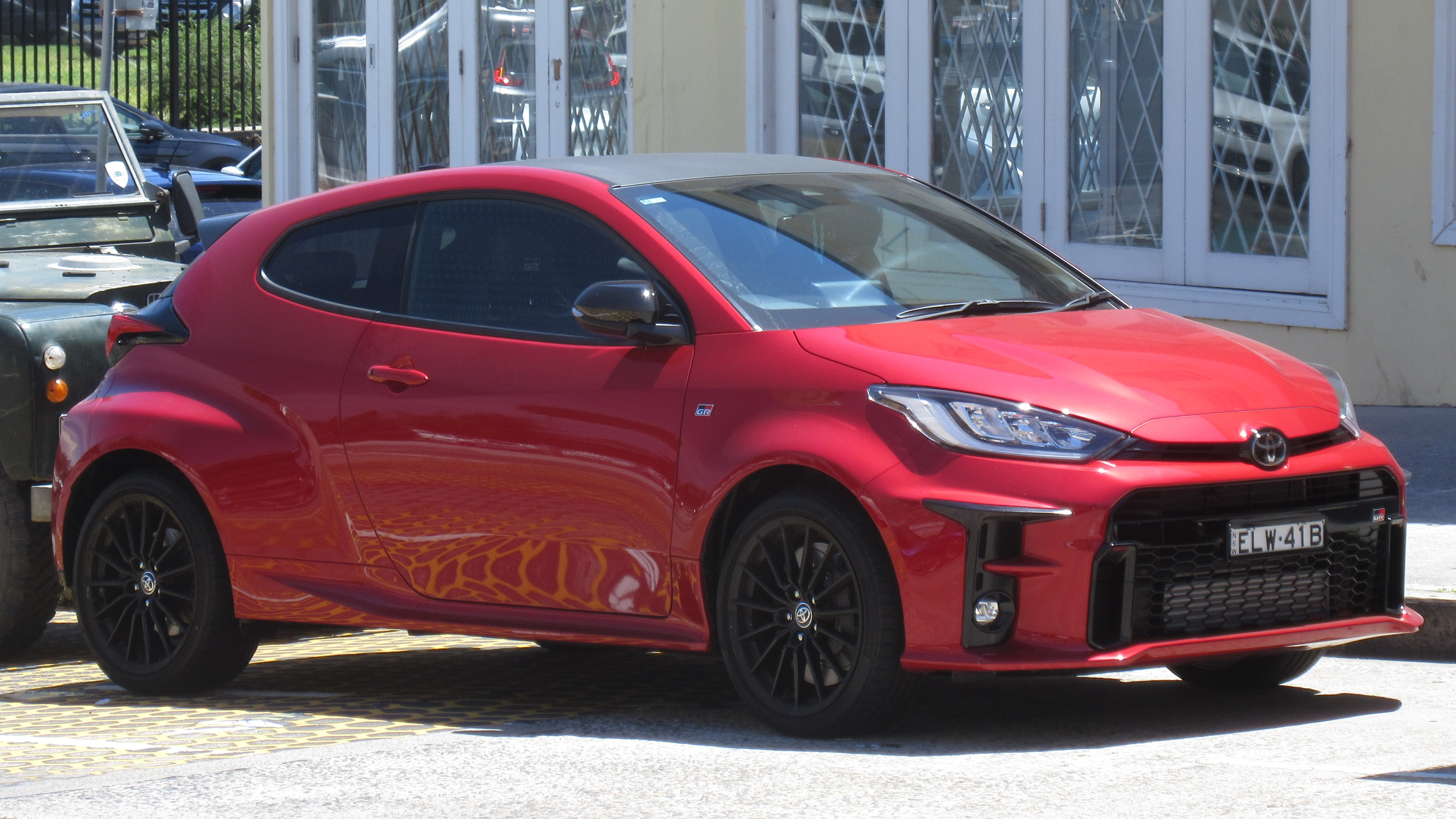
Toyota GR Yaris

Performance-oriented versions of B-segment hatchbacks were developed and sold as a more expensive offering. Current examples include the Ford Fiesta ST, Hyundai i20 N, Peugeot 208 GTi, Suzuki Swift Sport, Toyota GR Yaris, Volkswagen Polo GTI, among others.

=== MPV/minivan ===
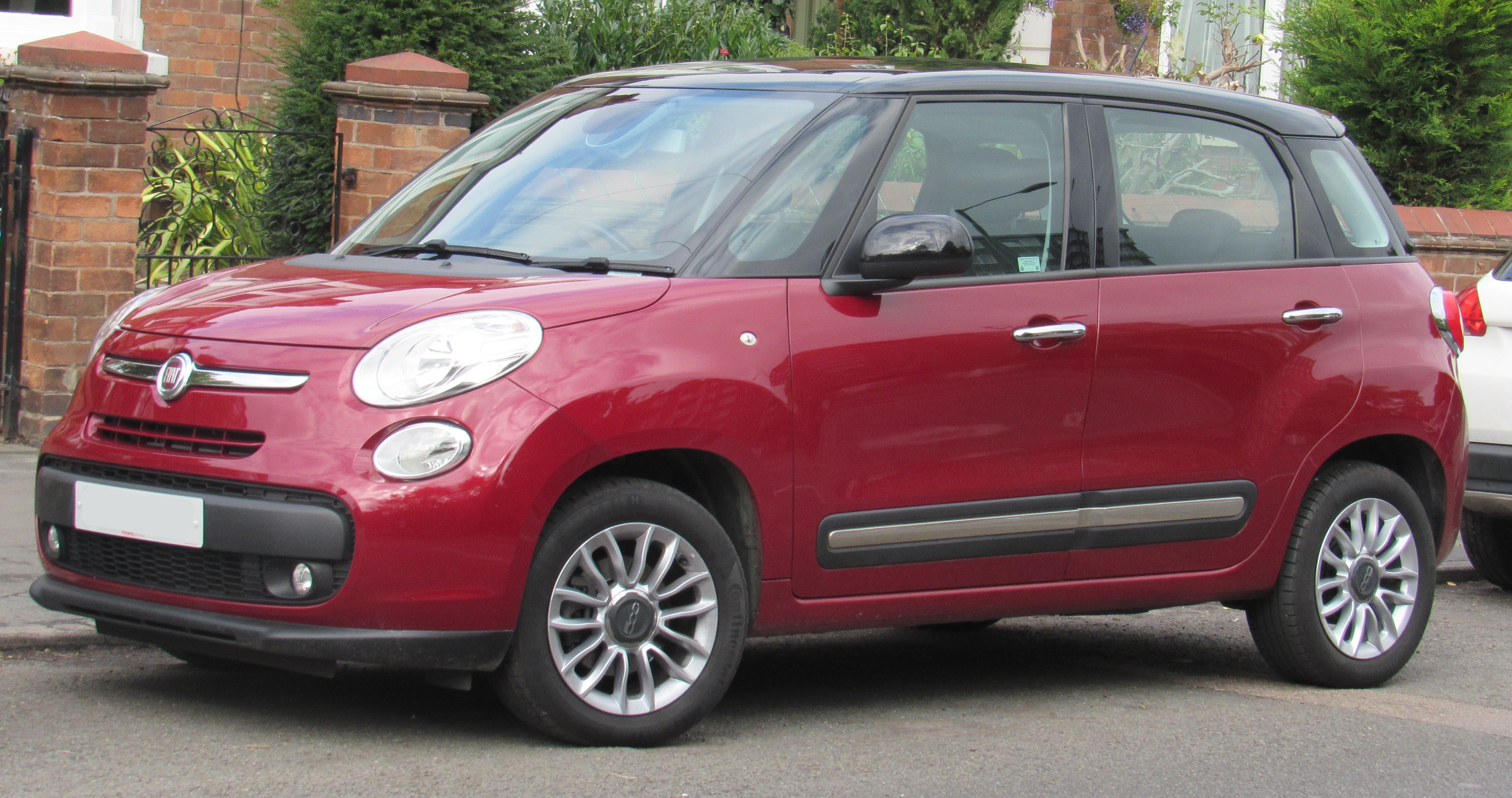
Fiat 500L (2012–2022)

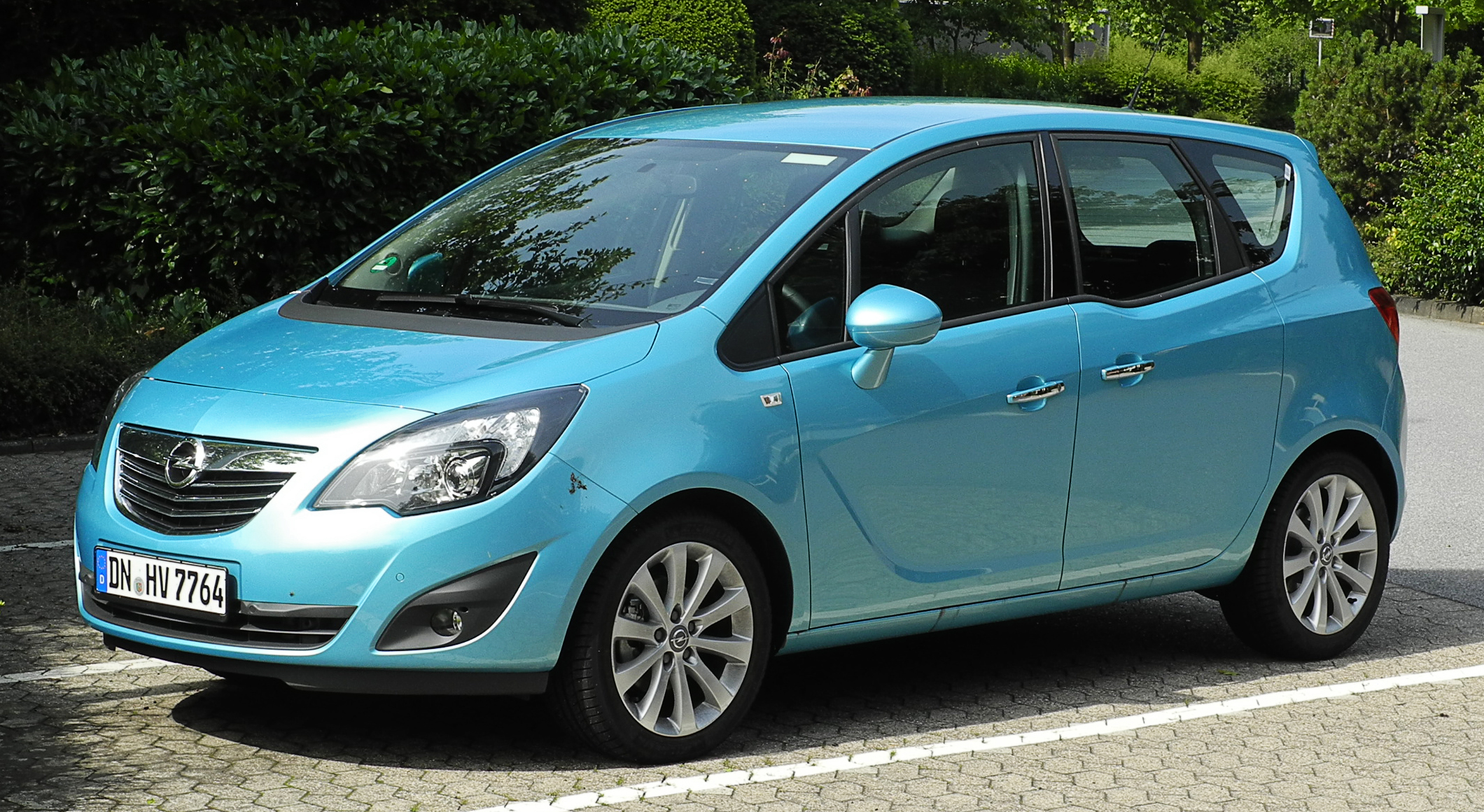
Opel Meriva (2003–2017)

B-segment MPV (also called mini MPV or B-MPV) are taller and/or longer derivatives of B-segment hatchbacks with an emphasis in interior space and practicality. Examples are the Citroën C3 Picasso, Fiat 500L, and Ford B-Max.

=== Crossover/SUV ===
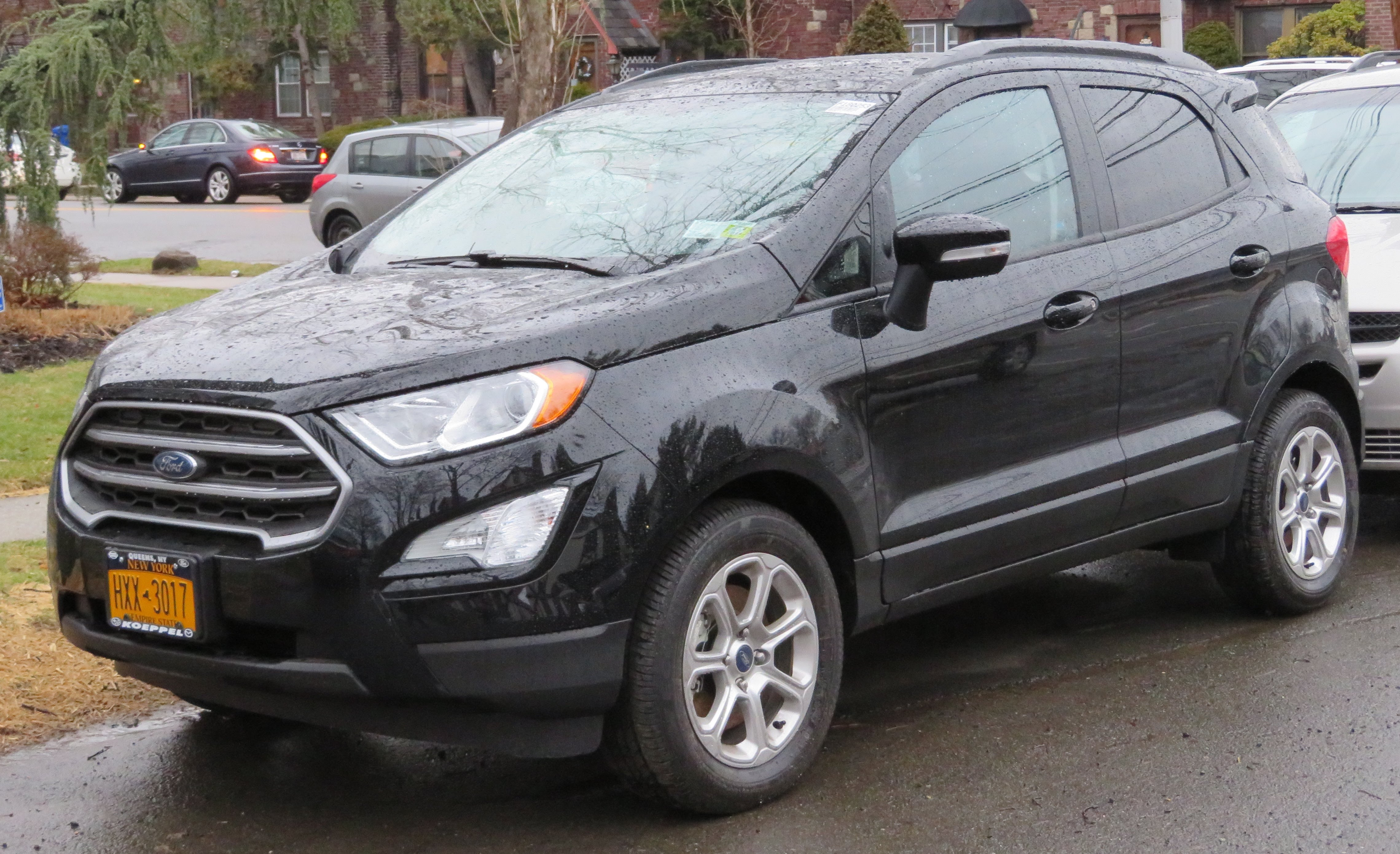
Ford EcoSport

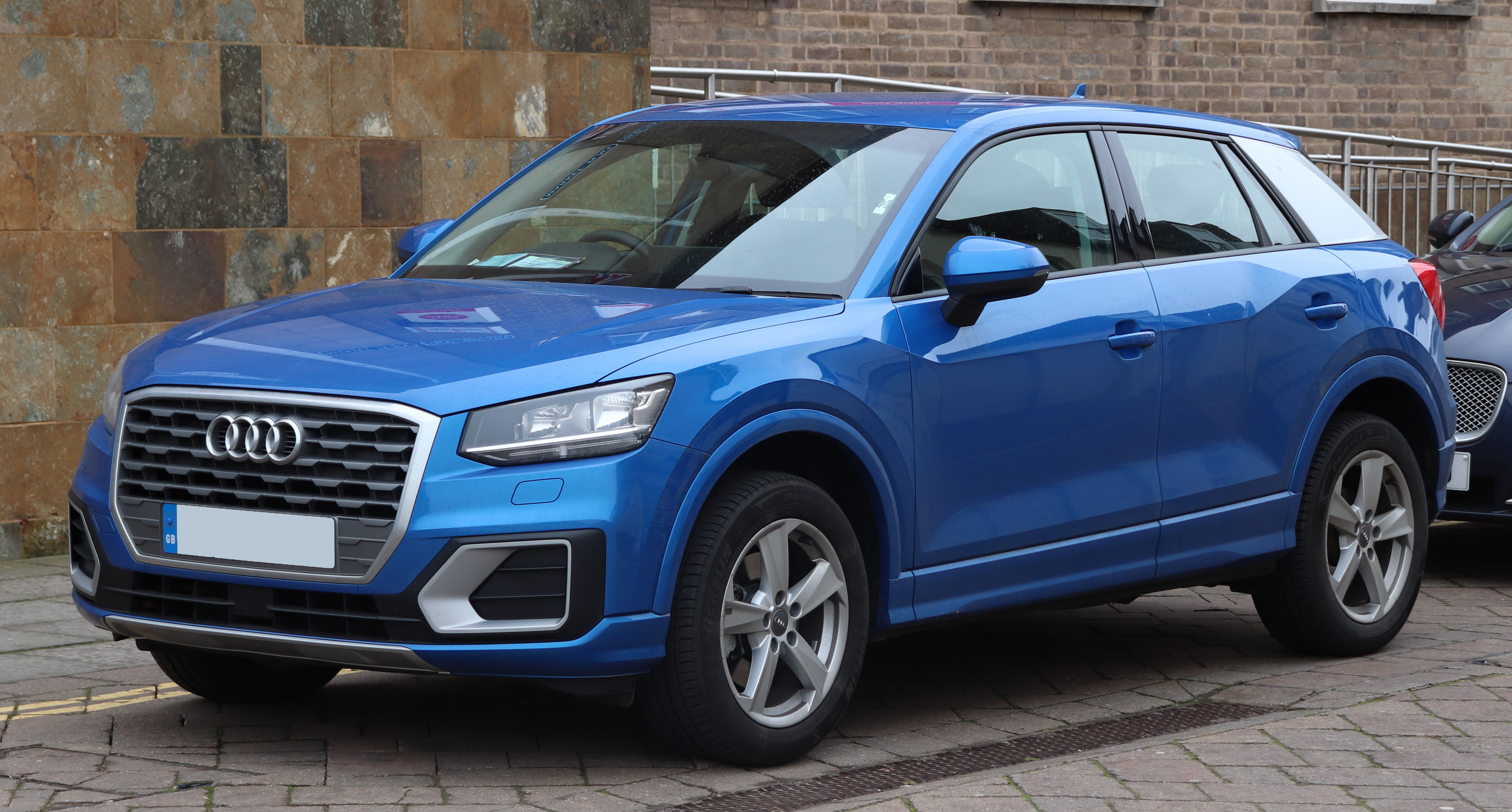
Audi Q2

B-segment crossovers or SUVs (also called subcompact crossover SUV, small SUV, or B-SUV ) are crossovers/SUVs that has a dimensions on par or slightly larger than traditional B-segment cars, and often are built on the same platform as B-segment hatchbacks or saloons. B-segment SUVs are usually excluded by analysts from traditional B-segment car sales. 22 percent of SUV global sales were contributed by B-segment SUVs in 2019.

== Electric vehicles ==
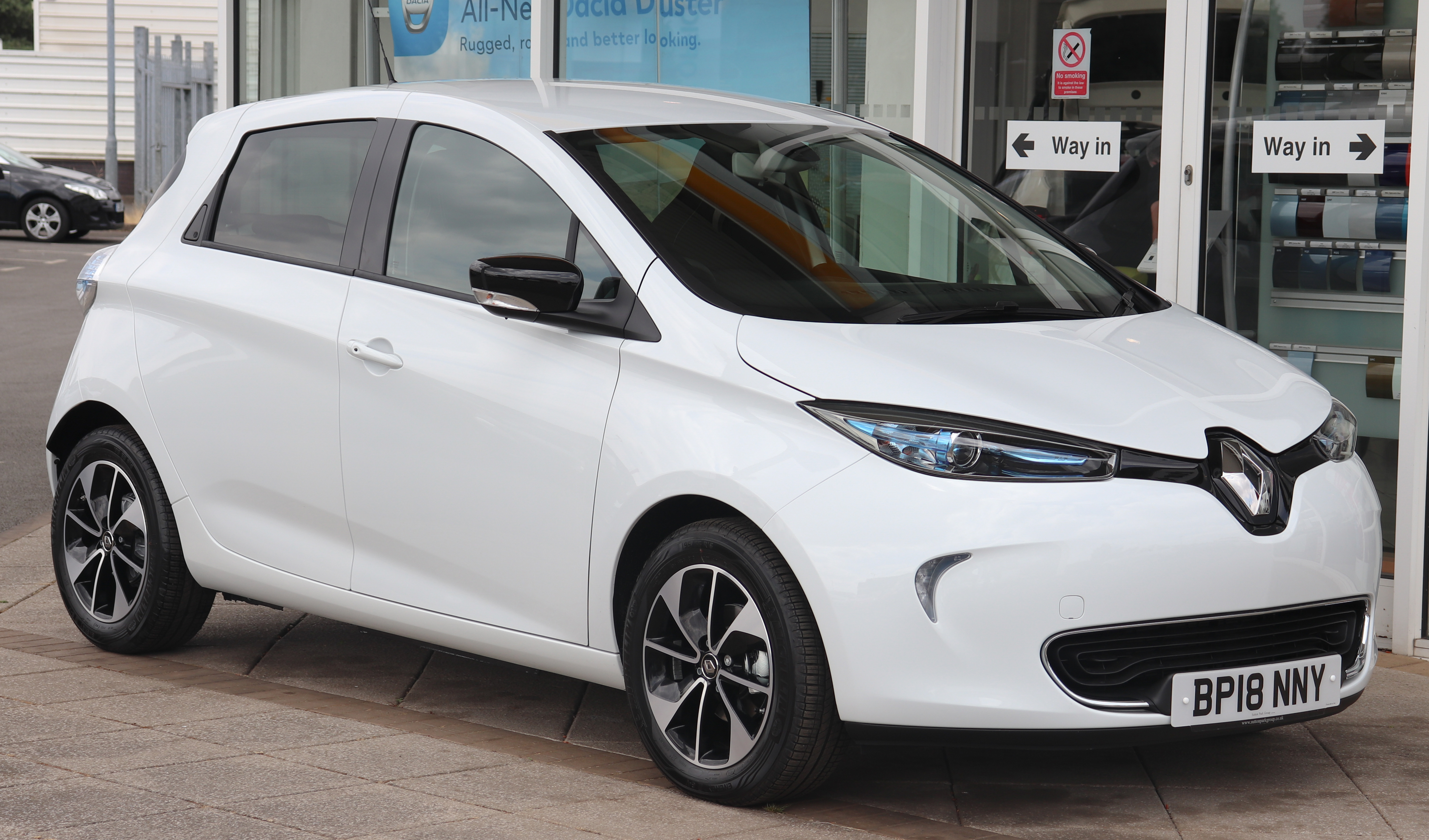
The Renault Zoe is one of the first mass-market B-segment electric cars in Europe.

One of the first mass-market electric B-segment cars in Europe was the Renault Zoe, released in 2012. Global sales of the Zoe achieved the 50,000 unit milestone in June 2016, and 200,000 units by March 2020. Other manufacturers followed suit; Groupe PSA introduced the Peugeot e-208 and Opel Corsa-e in 2019, while Honda followed with the low-volume Honda e, and Mini with their Mini Electric.

== List of vehicles ==
Category:Subcompact cars ( 330 )

== See also ==
- Car classification
- Subcompact car
