= BMW ActiveE =

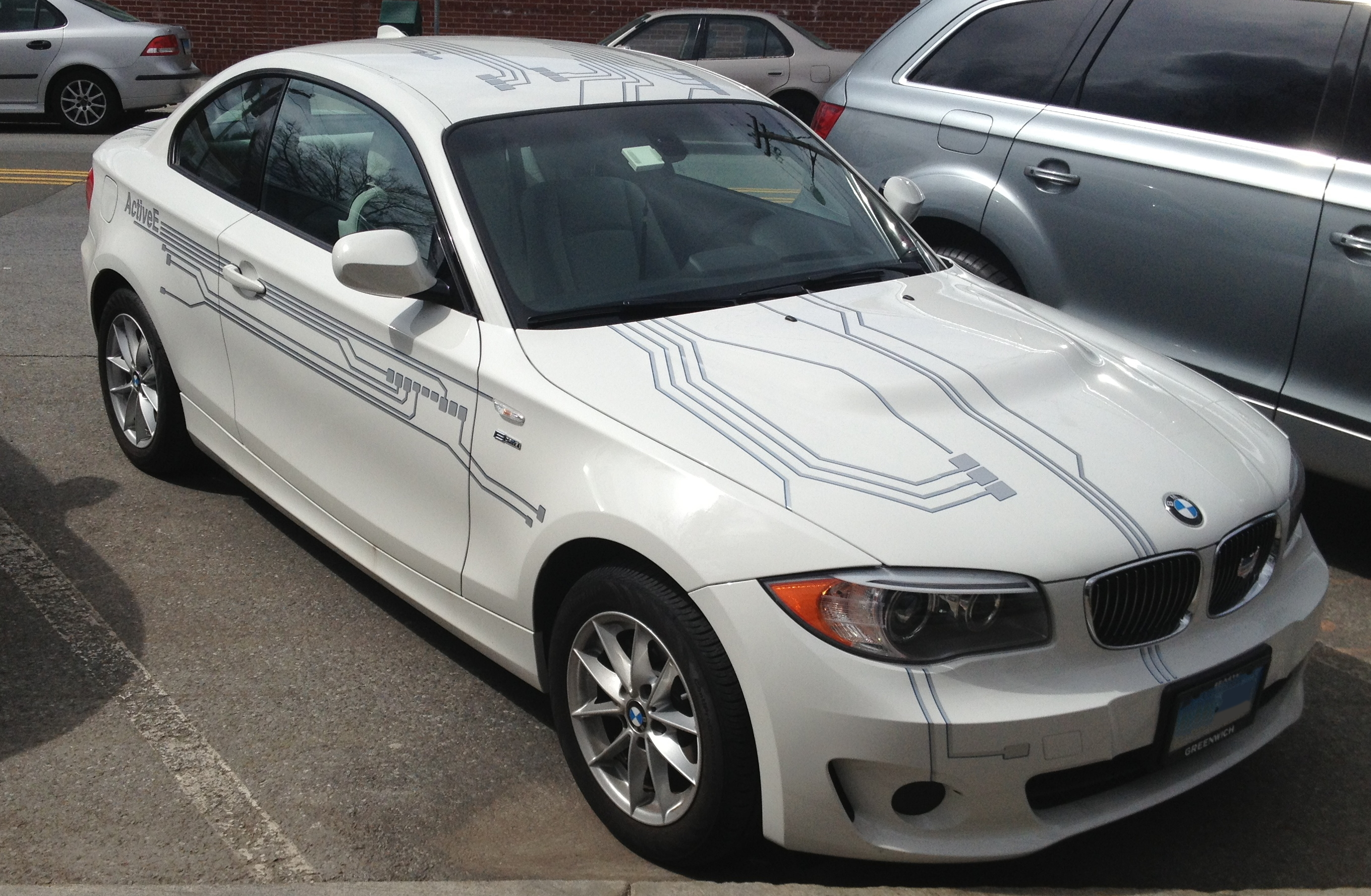

Overview
- Manufacturer: BMW
- Also called: BMW 1 Series ActiveE
- Production: 2012; 1,100 built
- Model years: 2012
- Assembly: Germany: Leipzig (BMW Leipzig Plant)
- Designer: Chris Bangle (BMW 1 Series)

Body and chassis
- Class: Electric vehicle demonstrator
- Body style: 2-door coupe
- Layout: Rear-motor, rear-wheel drive
- Platform: BMW 1 Series (E82/E88)
- Related: BMW 1 Series (E87)

Powertrain
- Electric motor: 168 hp (125 kW)
- Transmission: 1-Speed Electric Drive
- Battery: 32.0 kWh lithium-ion battery
- Electric range: 151 km (94 mi) (EPA)

Dimensions
- Wheelbase: 14 ft 4.2 in (172.2 in; 437.4 cm)
- Width: 5 ft 8.8 in (68.8 in; 174.8 cm)
- Height: 4 ft 8 in (56.0 in; 142.2 cm)
- Curb weight: 1,800 kg (4,000 lb)

Chronology
- Predecessor: Mini E
- Successor: BMW i3, BMW i8

The BMW ActiveE was a demonstration electric car based on the BMW 1 Series small family cars. It was the second vehicle after the Mini E to be developed under BMW Group’s Project i. The electric drive system was the latest addition to BMW’s EfficientDynamics programme. The US Environmental Protection Agency official range is 151 kilometres (94 mi), with an energy consumption of 33 kW·h/100 miles, and the agency rated the ActiveE's combined fuel economy at 2.3L/100 km (102 miles per gallon gasoline equivalent).

The four-seater, rear-wheel drive ActiveE was unveiled at the North American International Auto Show in Detroit in January 2010. Deliveries of the ActiveE for field testing in the U.S. began in January 2012, after the Mini E trial ended. A total of 1,100 vehicles were planned to participate in the program worldwide, with 700 allocated for the U.S. trial and 35 to a trial in China. Participants in the Mini E trial had priority to lease the new electric car. Production began at BMW's Leipzig plant in July 2011.

After the field trial of the Mini E, BMW took reservations for drivers, who BMW calls "Electronauts", in mid-2012. The field trial of the ActiveE started in early 2012. BMW stopped accepting reservations for the ActiveE, and has leased out all of their ActiveE cars. The lease details were similar to that of the Mini E lease details, a two-year limited lease with free maintenance. The lessee had to complete online surveys and take their ActiveE into their local BMW dealership for analysis and service periodically.

Once the ActiveE program ended, all ActiveE cars were taken off of the road. Lessees returned their ActiveE vehicles to BMW, and were not able to purchase them. The cars were donated to tech schools or museums for analysis and disassembly, as well as for display purposes.

== Specifications ==
The electric car had a 32 kWh lithium-ion battery pack developed in cooperation with SB LiMotive and an all-electric range of 160 kilometres (99 mi). The ActiveE takes 8.5 seconds to reach 97 kilometres per hour (60 mph) and its maximum speed was electronically limited to 140 kilometres per hour (87 mph). The ActiveE had an EcoPro mode that retards throttle response, shuts down the defrosters and tweaks the climate control to boost efficiency by up to 10%.

The ActiveE had a 125 kW (168 hp) electric synchronous motor integrated into the rear axle to power the rear wheels, the same configuration that will be used in the BMW i3. The motor weighs 91 kg (201 lb) and delivers 249 N⋅m (184 ft⋅lbf) of torque. The curb weight of the ActiveE is 1,815 kg (4,001 lb), nearly 360 kg (790 lb) heavier than a BMW 135i, but the ActiveE has a 50:50 weight distribution. The liquid-cooled storage cells are located under the hood, in the transmission tunnel and where the fuel tank would normally reside. The rear-mounted electric motor reduces the trunk space to 200 L (7.1 cu ft) versus 280 L (9.9 cu ft) in the standard BMW 1 Series.

Based on some of the lessons learned by BMW regarding cold weather problems during the Mini E field testing, the ActiveE was planned to have liquid cooling and liquid heating, with a thermal management system that was hoped to keep ActiveE batteries at an optimal performance temperature. The ActiveE comes with all the standard ConnectedDrive features including navigation, Sirius satellite radio, Google Local Search and Send-to-Car functionality, and a range of connected apps that normally come in higher-spec models. Also included with the ActiveE is a reworked BMW MyRemote application for the smartphones that allows remote locking and unlocking, horn and headlamp activation, and GPS-based CarFinder that allows the user to find the E within 1 km (0.62 mi). The smartphone app also allows the user to find charging stations, get range information and pre-heat or cool the car to help extend the range.

Like other electric vehicles with use of the motor for regeneration of battery power, the Active E had a different driving experience from a car powered by an internal combustion engine: taking pressure off of the accelerator pedal results in deceleration as the motor brakes and regenerates electricity. Many drivers rarely used the brakes except to hold the car at a stop.

== EPA ratings ==
The US Environmental Protection Agency official range is 151 km (94 mi), with a city/highway combined energy consumption of 33 kWh/160 kilometers. Under its five-cycle testing, EPA rated the ActiveE at 2.3L/100 km (102 miles per gallon gasoline equivalent) combined fuel economy, with a rating of 37.88 kpl equivalent in city driving and 33.98 kpl equivalent on highways.

== Production ==
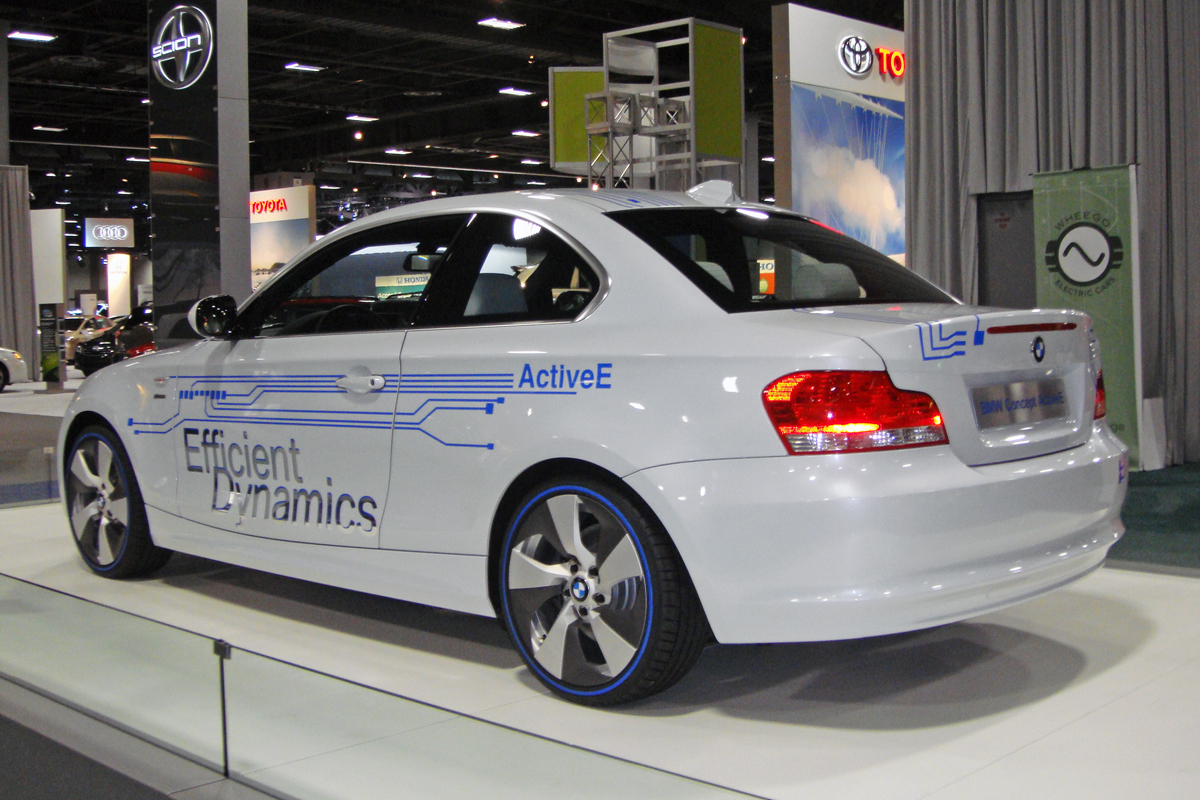
ActiveE concept electric car exhibited at the 2010 Washington Auto Show.

Production of the ActiveE began at BMW's Leipzig plant in July 2011.

== Field testing ==
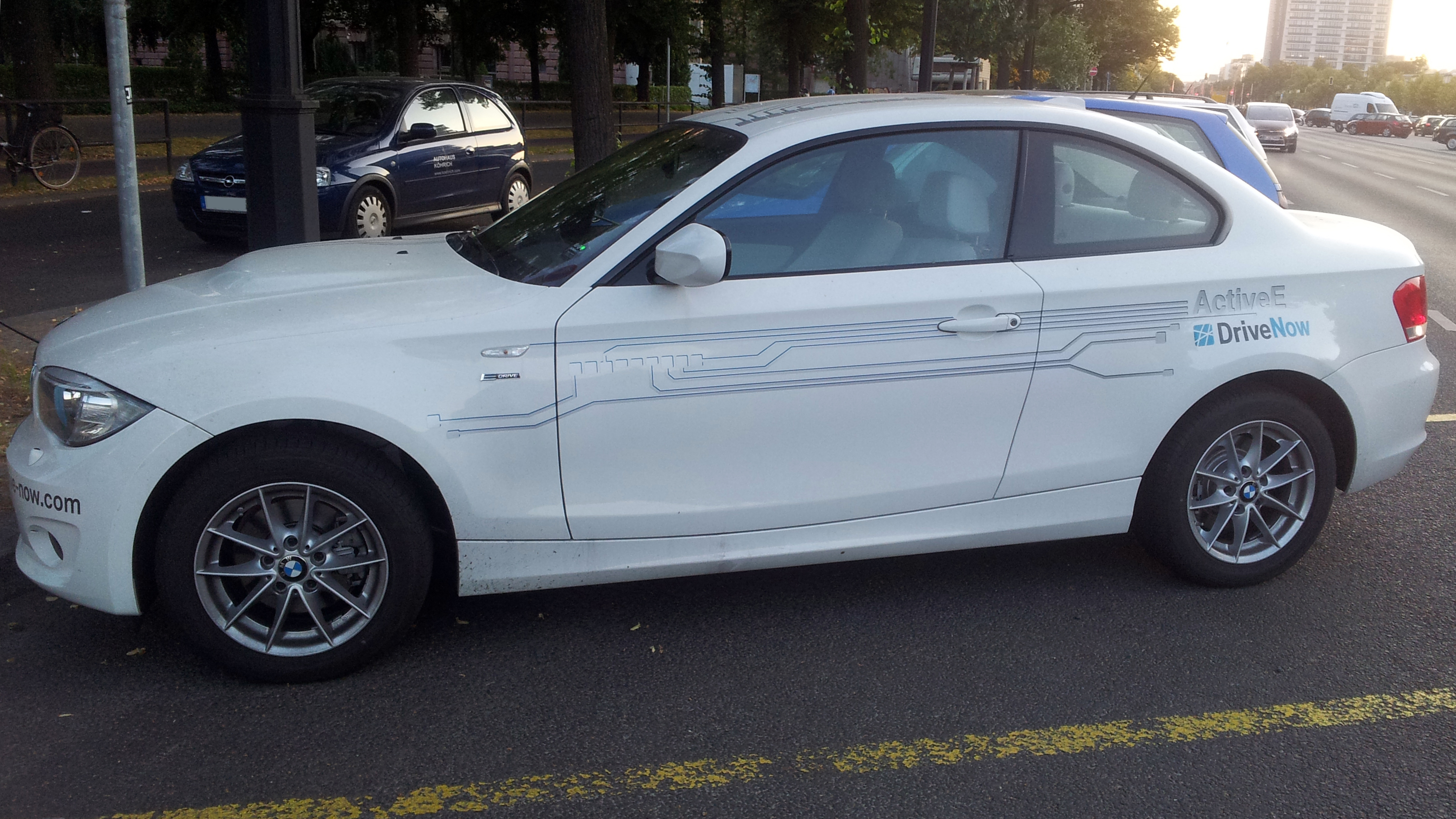
BMW ActiveE parked in Germany.

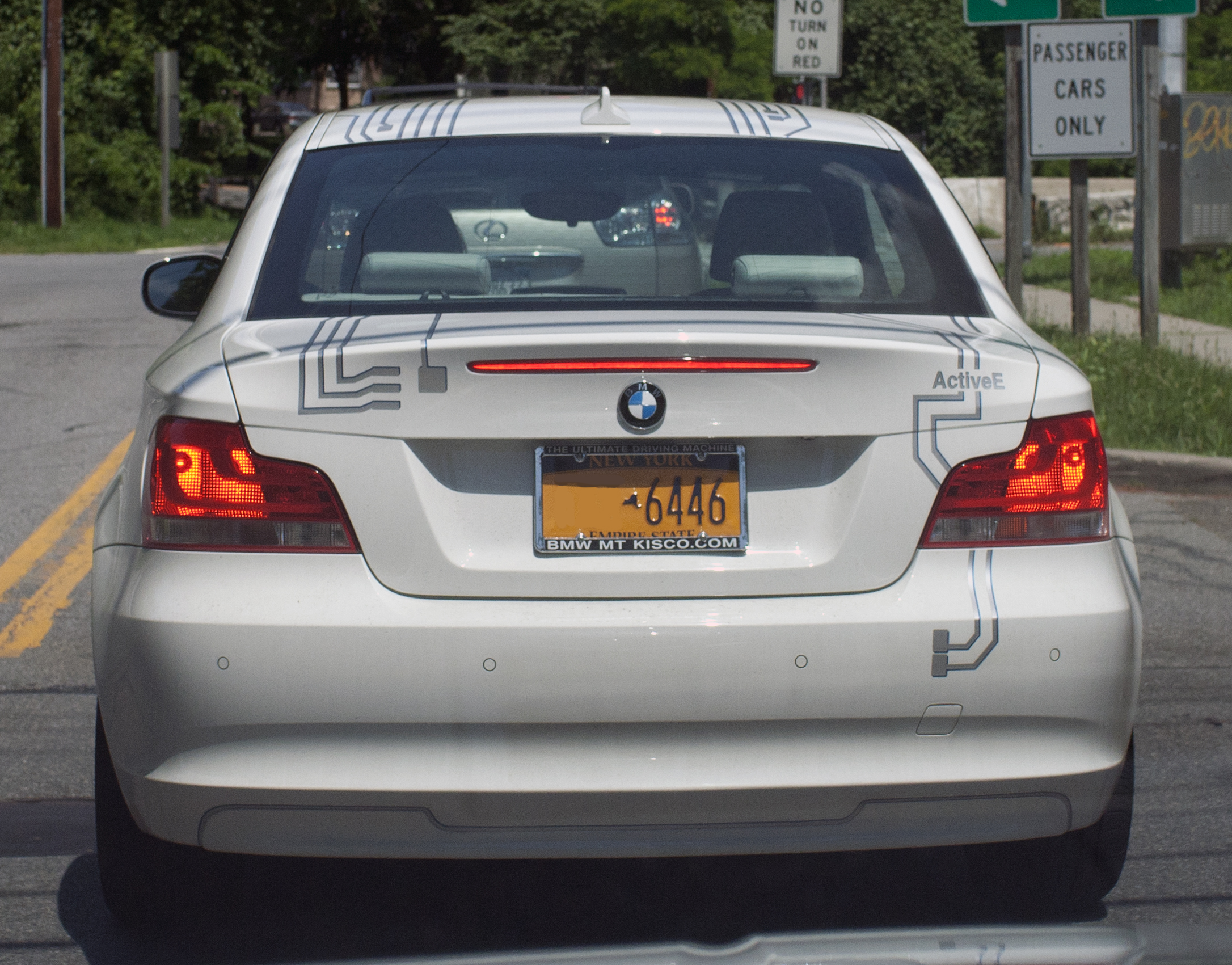
BMW ActiveE undergoing field testing in New York.

=== United States ===
The first ActiveE delivery in the United States took place in New Jersey on 13 January 2012. BMW explained that the first delivery went to the customer that logged more miles than anyone else in the U.S. Mini-E program. Participants in the Mini E trial had priority as test pilots for the new electric car. This trial was as a follow-up to the Mini E field testing and as a second phase of BMW's Project i. The third and last phase of "Project i" was the development of the BMW i3, an urban electric car that went into mass production in 2013.

The ActiveE field testing was expected to include 700 cars and in addition to Los Angeles and New York, where the Mini E U.S. trials took place, it will also be available in San Diego, San Francisco, Sacramento, Boston, and select markets in Connecticut. The 700 ActiveE test pilots were dubbed by BMW as "Electronauts." The ActiveE lease pricing was $499 a month for 24 months with a down payment of US$2,250. A total of 673 units were leased in the U.S. through August 2012, and no additional units were delivered during 2013. An additional 70 cars were used in BMW's DriveNow carsharing pilot in the San Francisco Bay Area.

As thanks for their participation in the trial lease program, ActiveE drivers enjoyed priority ordering the BMW i3 and the first batch of cars was allocated to these customers with delivery scheduled for the end of April 2014, ahead of the American market launch in May. ActiveE customers were allowed to order the i3 with any option they select and they received for free the heated seats and DC quick charge options. Also, BMW created some unique features for the i3 cars of ActiveE lessees, such as embroidered front trunk liner and BMW i floor mats, and interior, exterior and door sill badging. BMW called these cars the “Electronaut Edition i3″ and could only be purchased by ActiveE customers.

=== United Kingdom ===
A total of 160 ActiveEs were deployed during the London 2012 Summer Olympics as part of BMW fleet of 4,000 low-emission vehicles allocated to transport dignitaries and officials during the Olympiad.

=== Germany ===
ActiveEs have been in use by the carsharing service DriveNow in a few German cities, amongst them Berlin and Munich, from 2013 onward. Those were later replaced by BMW i3 models.

== See also ==
- BMW 1 Series
- BMW i
- BMW i3 (BMW Mega City Vehicle)
- BMW i8 (Concept Vision EfficientDynamics)
- Mini E
- Plug-in electric car
- Government incentives for plug-in electric vehicles
- List of modern production plug-in electric vehicles
