= Mini E =

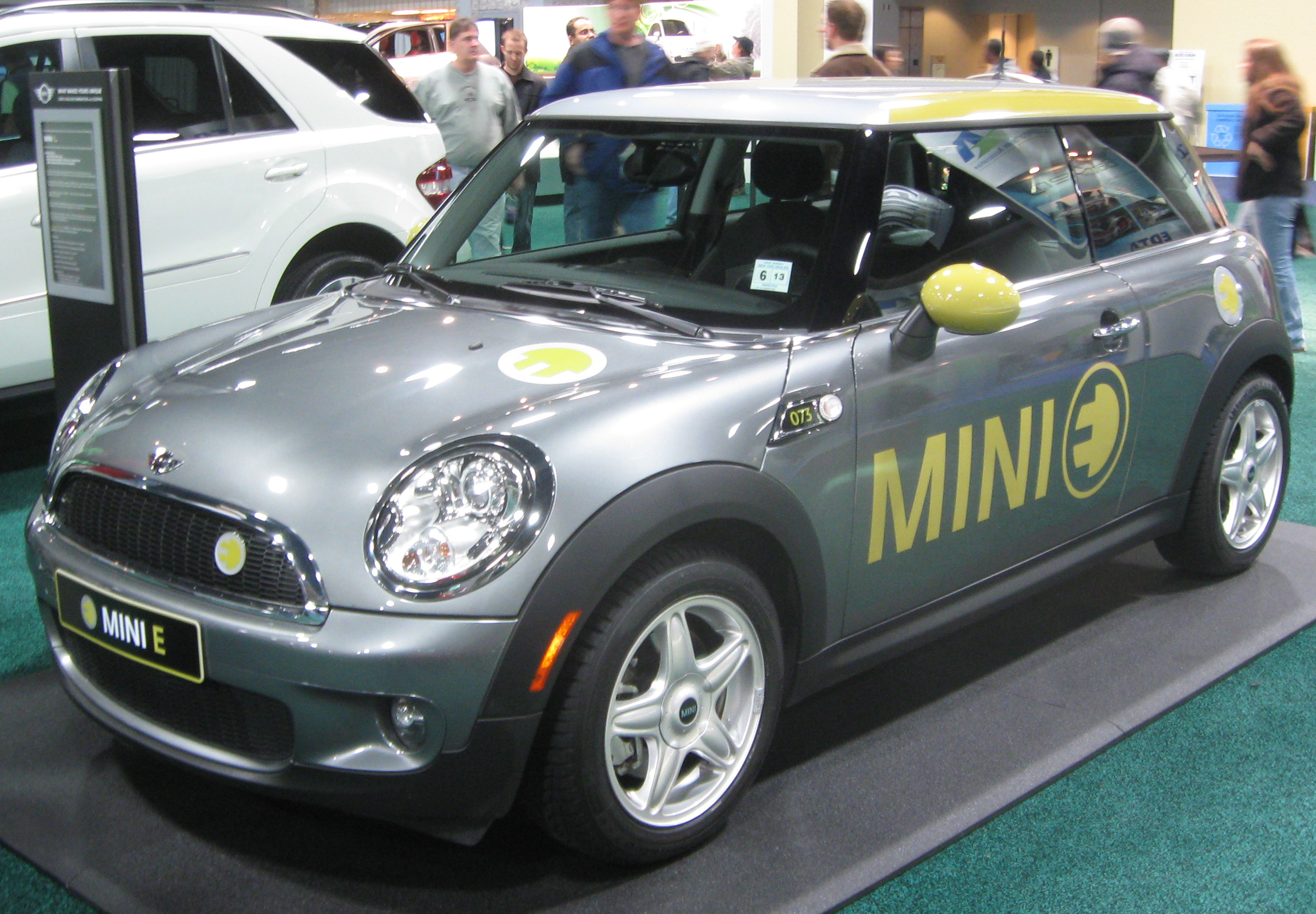

Overview
- Manufacturer: BMW i
- Production: 2009–2010
- Assembly: United Kingdom: Cowley, Oxfordshire (Plant Oxford)

Body and chassis
- Class: Small family car
- Body style: 3-door hatchback
- Layout: FF layout

Powertrain
- Electric motor: 150 kW (200 hp) asynchronous motor
- Transmission: 1-speed helical
- Battery: 35 kilowatt-hours (130 MJ) lithium ion battery
- Range: 100 mi (160 km)
- Plug-in charging: ODU proprietary connector for DaimlerChrysler

Dimensions
- Wheelbase: 97.1 in (2,466 mm)
- Length: 146.2 in (3,713 mm)
- Width: 66.3 in (1,684 mm)
- Height: 55.4 in (1,407 mm)

Chronology
- Successor: BMW ActiveE, Mini Electric

The Mini E was a demonstration electric car developed by BMW i as a conversion of its Mini Cooper car. The Mini E was developed for field trials and deployed in several countries, including the United States, Germany, UK, France, Japan and China. The field testing of the Mini E was part of BMW Project i, which was followed in January 2012 by a similar trial with the BMW ActiveE, and the last phase of project was the development of the BMW i3 urban electric car, that went into mass production in 2013. In 2019, BMW announced that the mass market Mini Electric will go in to production.

The first trial was launched in the U.S. in June 2009, and the Mini E was available through leasing to private users in Los Angeles and the New York/New Jersey area. Another field test was launched in the UK in December 2009, where more than forty Mini E cars were handed to private users for two consecutive six-month field trial periods. This trial program allowed the BMW Group to become the world's first major car manufacturer to deploy a fleet of more than 500 all-electric vehicles for private use. After the trial, some Mini Es were displayed in museums, others shipped to Germany for further lab testing, and the rest dismantled and crushed. The 40 Mini Es that participated in the UK trial were kept in use after the trial ended in March 2011, participating in promotional activities and forming part of BMW Group UK's official vehicle fleet for the London 2012 Olympic Games.

All Mini E vehicles were equipped similar to a standard Mini Cooper hatchback.

== History ==
The Mini E was unveiled at the 2008 Los Angeles Auto Show. BMW used its Mini brand to test its electric powertrain technology, but the vehicle was also developed in order to meet new California regulations that require carmakers to offer zero emission vehicles.

== Specifications ==
=== Powertrain ===
The Mini E is powered by an asynchronous electric motor that is mounted in the former engine bay and is rated at 204 PS (150 kW) and 160 lbf⋅ft (220 N⋅m) of torque. Drive is sent to the front wheels. The Mini E employs a lithium-ion battery pack with an overall capacity of 130 megajoules (35 kWh). The batteries weigh 572 pounds (259 kg) and replace the back seat. Top speed is electronically limited to 95 mph (153 km/h), with 0–62 mph (0–100 km/h) acceleration in 8 seconds. The car's range is 156 miles (251 km) on a single charge under optimal conditions. Estimates of normal driving conditions put ranges at 109 miles (175 km) city and 96 miles (154 km) highway.

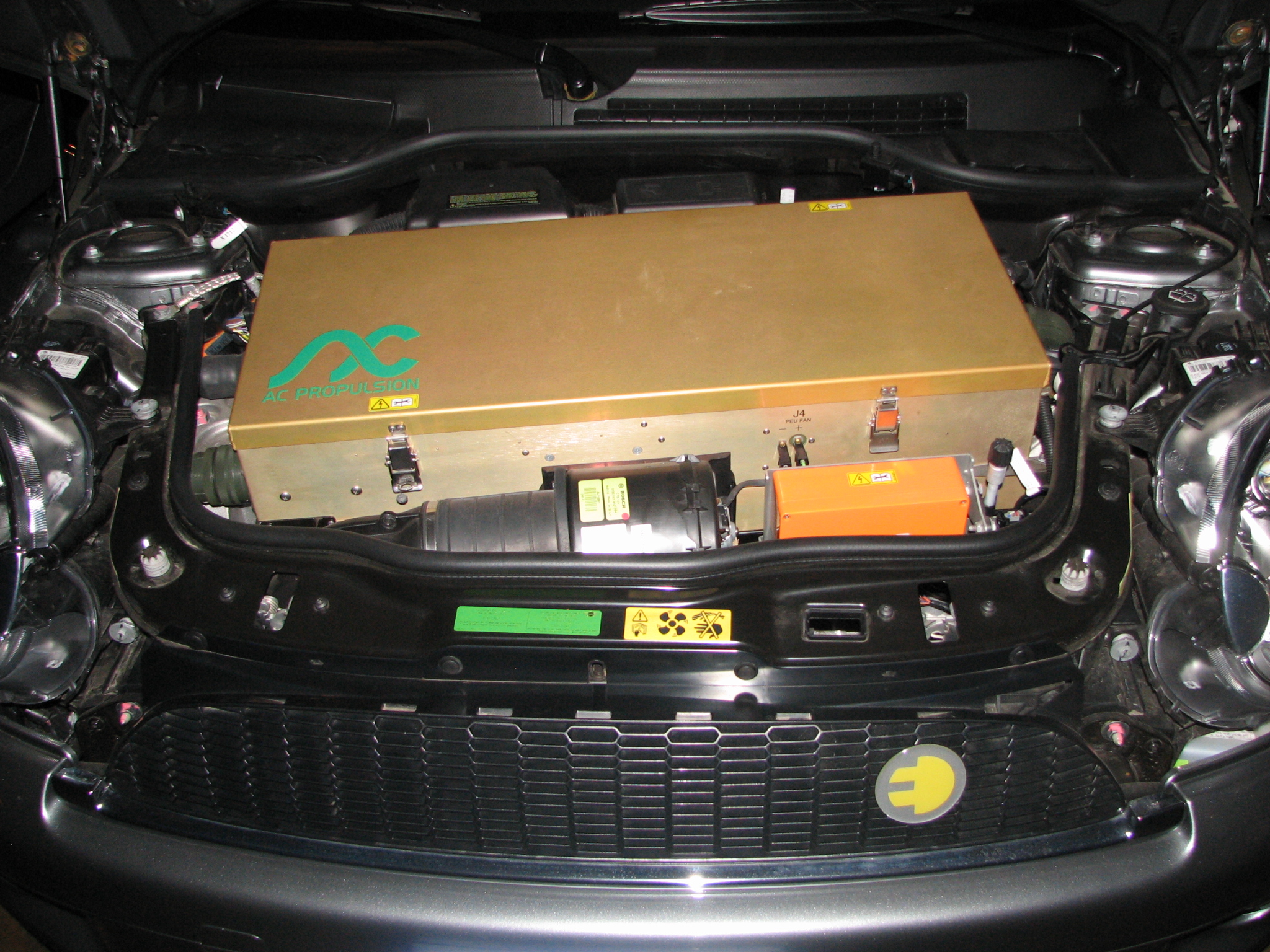
Mini E under the bonnet

AC Propulsion issued a news release on 19 November 2008, announcing they were a supplier for Mini E. The news release stated that AC Propulsion supplied a specially developed version of its proprietary tzero, a registered trademark, technology, including air-cooled copper-rotor induction motor and Li ion battery on the Mini E. It is characterized by high performance, high efficiency, and fast charging.

=== Charging ===
The Mini E could be charged by 120-volt (at 12 amp) and 240-volt (at 32 or 48 amp) power sources; charging times were 20 hours and 3.5 hours (fast-charge system). Charge rate was set from the instrument panel before charging.

The 240-volt 32-amp home "wall box" charging stations for the US trial were made by Clipper Creek, with a proprietary electrical connector to the car made by ODU.

=== Performance ===
The accelerator was a drive-by-wire system with a soft start to limit the electric motor's response and prevent burnout from a standstill. After this initial delay, response goes back to normal.

The Mini E's regenerative braking was designed to capture as much kinetic energy as possible giving it a distinct driving characteristic. When the driver released the acceleration pedal, the Mini E started braking, slowing it down significantly as if the brake pedal were pressed.

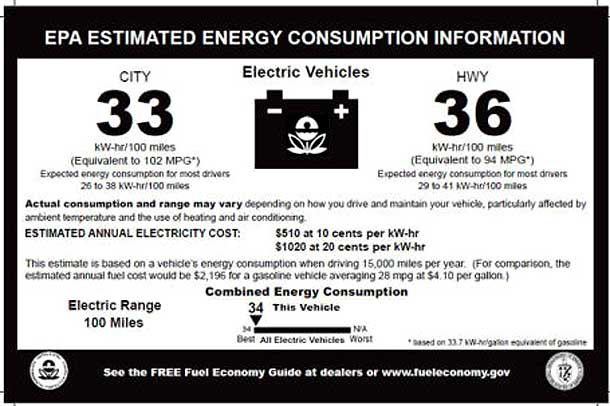
2009 U.S. Environmental Protection Agency's fuel economy label for the Mini E

=== EPA ratings ===
The United States Environmental Protection Agency (EPA) certified the Mini E range as 100 mi (160 km), with a city/highway combined energy consumption of 34 kW·h/100 miles. Under its five-cycle testing, EPA rated the Mini E at 98 miles per gallon gasoline equivalent (2.4 L/100 km) combined fuel economy, with a rating of 102 mpg_{‑US} (2.3 L/100 km; 122 mpg_{‑imp}) equivalent in city driving and 94 mpg_{‑US} (2.5 L/100 km; 113 mpg_{‑imp}) equivalent on highways. This information was displayed in the window sticker in terms of energy consumption, as 33 kW·h/100 miles for city and 36 kW·h/100 miles for highway.

=== Production ===
The Mini factory in Oxford, England supplied vehicle gliders to a team in Munich, Germany who added the electric running gear.

== Field trial program ==
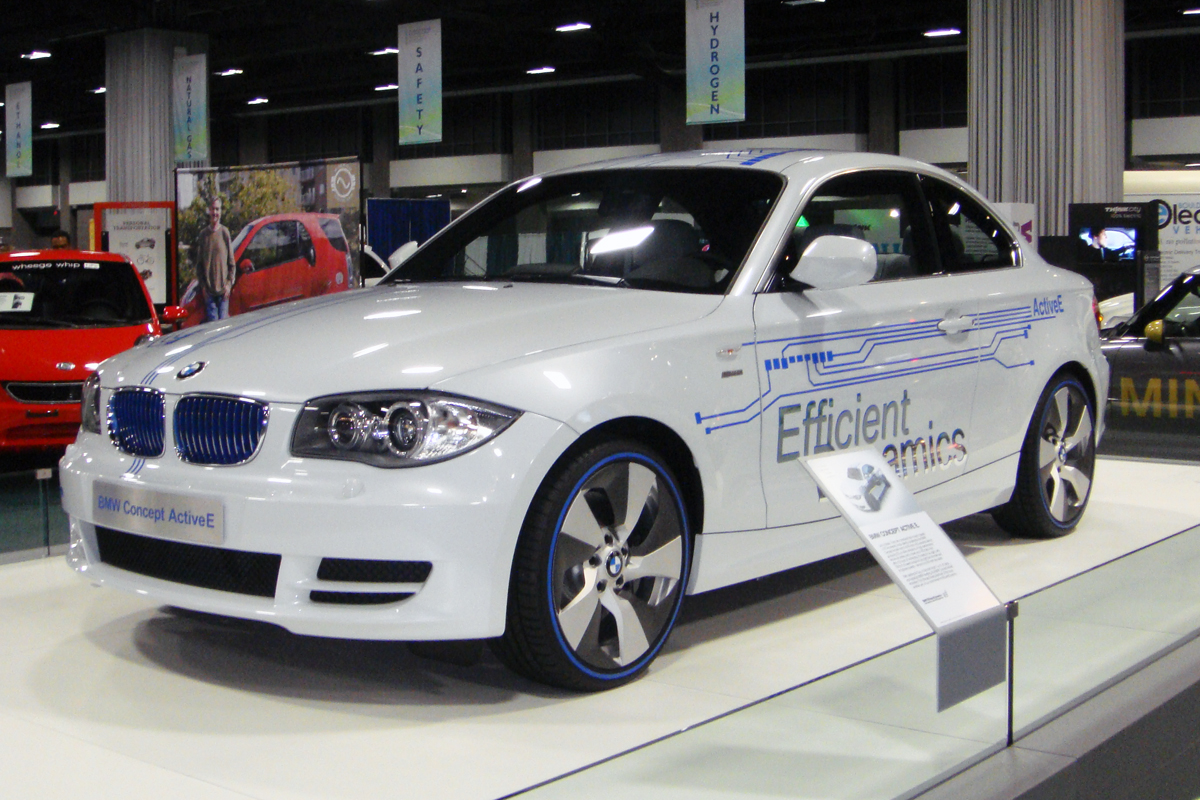
The Mini E trial was followed by the field testing of the BMW ActiveE in the U.S. that began in January 2012.

Field testing of the Mini E was part of BMW Project i, and was followed in January 2012 by a similar trial with the BMW ActiveE all-electric vehicle. After the Mini E trial program ended, some cars were displayed in museums, others shipped to Germany for further lab testing, and the rest dismantled and crushed.

Mini E drivers participating in the field trial program of the vehicle were required to participate in online surveys and discussions, and to bring their vehicle into their local dealership to be worked on. The car was available only as a three-year limited lease, and drivers were required to return their cars to BMW who destroyed or donated them to tech schools and museums for display, disassembly, and analysis purposes.

=== U.S. program ===
In the U.S. 9,500 people signed up to lease the 450 Mini Es available. In June 2009, BMW started the program by leasing 250 units in the Los Angeles area and 200 in the New York/New Jersey area. The leasing price was set at US$850 (approx. €600) a month for one year and included collision coverage, maintenance costs, and home installation of the charging station. Residents of New Jersey did not pay sales tax on their lease due to the existing state exemption for battery electric vehicles.

In May 2010, BMW announced that leasing could be renewed for another year at a lower price of US$600 a month. This renewal was offered to all individuals who had a Mini E lease at the time but fleet customers were excluded and according to BMW half of all lessees agreed to the extension.

=== European program ===
==== France ====
Field testing in Paris with 50 units began in 2010.

==== Germany ====
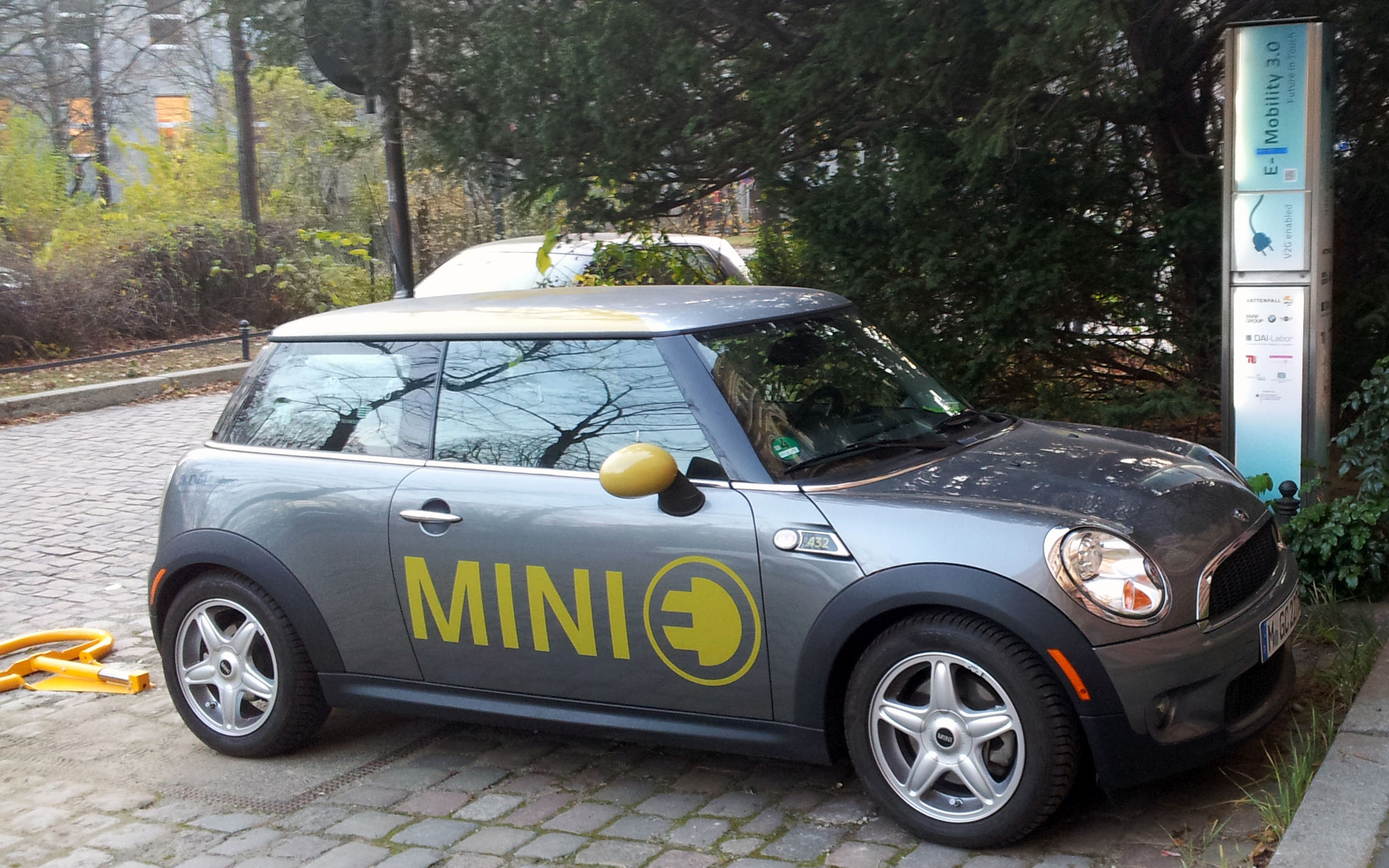
Mini E recharging in Germany

A total of 100 trial vehicles were assigned to Germany. Testing in Berlin began in June 2009, and for the second phase, a total of 70 vehicles were delivered in March 2011 to private customers and fleet users. Field testing began in Munich in September 2010, for a leasing fee of €400 (approx. US$517) per month.

==== United Kingdom ====
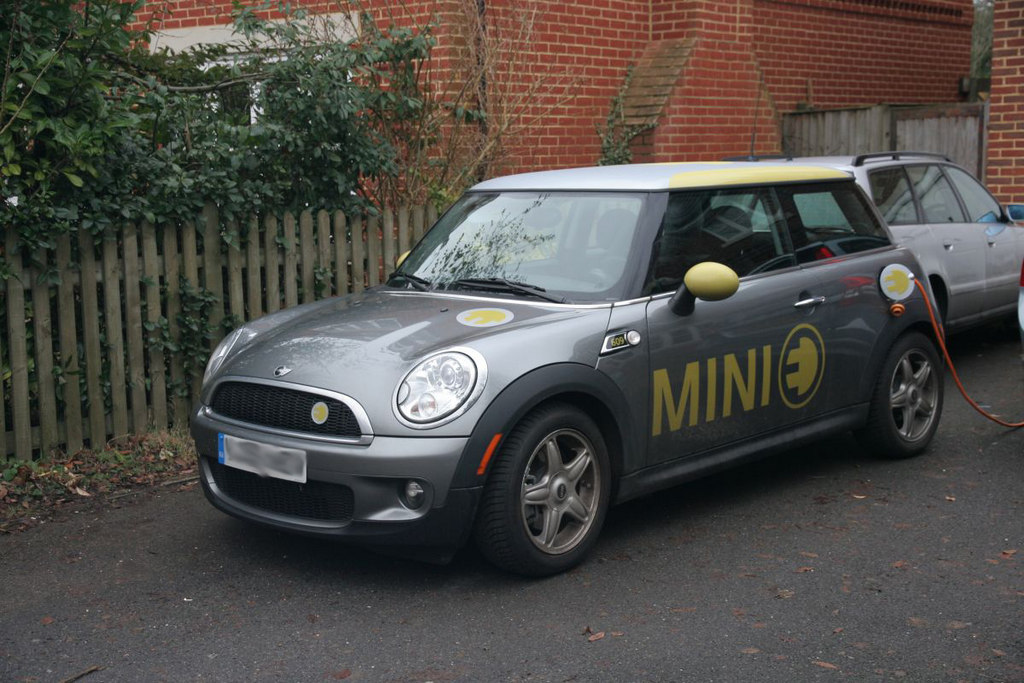
Mini E recharging in the UK

Testing in the U.K. took place between December 2009 and March 2011 with 40 Mini E cars handed to private users for two consecutive six-month field trial periods. The leasing price was set at £330 (around US$536) per month, which included VAT, insurance, service, and maintenance. One MINI E was delivered to the Government car pool in Downing Street to be tested by ministers in an urban environment on their official business around London.

The UK trial was a partnership between BMW Group UK, Scottish and Southern Energy, the South East England Development Agency (SEEDA), Oxford City Council and Oxfordshire County Council. Data collection and research was conducted by Oxford Brookes University's Sustainable Vehicle Engineering Centre throughout the UK project. Funding support was provided by the Technology Strategy Board and the Department for Transport (DFT) as part of the £25 million (US$41 million) UK-wide program involving trials of 340 ultra-low carbon vehicles from several car makers. The selected test area is roughly a triangle contained within the M40 motorway between the M25 motorway and Oxford, the A34 south to the M3 motorway, and the M3 back to the M25.

The 40 Mini E electric cars were kept in use after the trial was completed in March 2011, participating in activities to promote awareness and understanding of electric vehicles. These cars were part of the BMW Group UK's official vehicle fleet of 4,000 low-emission luxury vehicles deployed for the London 2012 Olympic Games. The fleet also included 160 BMW ActiveE electric cars.

=== China ===
Field testing in Beijing started on 22 February 2011. Testing also took place in Shenzhen.

=== Japan ===
A field trial took place in Tokyo in 2011.

=== Field test results ===
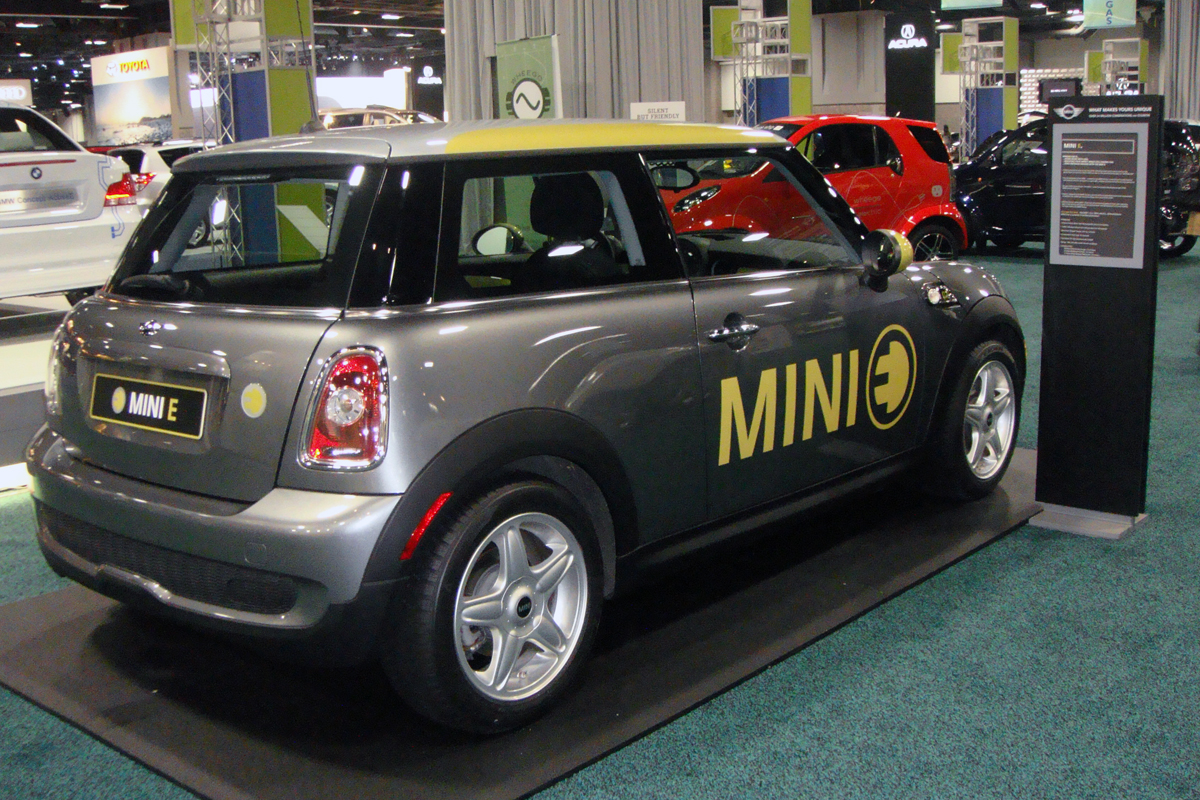
Rear view of the Mini E.

The main concerns reported by those participating in the U.S. during the first year trial were range anxiety and lack of public charging infrastructure, as the country had only 734 public charging stations, most located in California. Another concern was the 100-mile (160 km) range on a fully charged battery reducing to between 80 and 90 miles (140 km) during very cold weather. In the UK, an abnormally harsh winter also showed how very low temperatures diminished power output until the battery 'warmed-up'. There was one report of the range dropping below 40 miles (64 km) in sub-zero weather. There were issues reported with exterior charging points as winter temperatures dropped dramatically.

Other complaints in the U.S. related to the lack of space in the car as the battery pack eliminated the Mini's back seat and most of its cargo area, and the difficulties found in practice to install the charging equipment in homes; installation permits, site visits, inspections and installation could take up to a month.

BMW

According to the BMW team of engineers responsible for the demonstration program, the following facts and key lessons were learned during the Mini E first year trial:

- Most of the Mini E applicants were well-educated and well-off males over 35, with an affinity for new technology, willing to experience a new and clean technology, and for them the lower vehicle running costs were not very important.
- Most drivers used the Mini E as a second vehicle and for the daily commute.
- Longest trip in a Mini E to date was 158 kilometres (98 mi)
- In the Berlin trial, the average Mini E remained stationary for over five hours in 80 per cent of the cases while being charged and most of the customers only charged their vehicles only two or three times a week. U.S. participants were more likely to charge up every night.
- Before the test, drivers said they expected range and charging time limitations to be a problem, however, during the actual trials these issues were only felt to be limitations in very few specific cases.
- In the Berlin test, BMW decided to compare how people drive an electric car to how they drive a more traditional model. For this purpose they identified willing applicants who had either a BMW 116i or a Mini Cooper and put data loggers in those vehicles. The results showed that vehicle usage of the Mini E only differs marginally from that of comparable Mini Cooper and BMW 116i trips.

UC Davis study

In May 2011 the Plug‐in Hybrid & Electric Vehicle (PH&EV) Research Center at the University of California, Davis published the results of a consumer study of the U.S. Mini E field trial. The study is based on surveys and interviews conducted with more than 120 families who leased the electric car for the period of June 2009 to June 2010. Some of the key findings of the consumer study are the following:

- 95% of the respondents drove fewer than 80 miles (130 km) a day; and 71% drove fewer than 40 miles (64 km).
- The study shows that households adapted their driving around the capabilities of the electric car, and respondents said the MINI E met 90% of their daily driving needs.
- Many drivers found that having limited cargo space and only two seats was more restrictive than the limited range.
- Cold weather had a significant impact on drivers in the New York and New Jersey areas, which suffered a particularly harsh winter during the study period. These drivers discovered an unacceptable drop in the vehicles' range when using the heater.
- In California, though infrequent, hot weather during August 2009 resulted in range loss and battery thermal management problems that required attention from BMW.
- Most drivers reported initial difficulties in mastering the MINI E aggressive regenerative braking system which is integrated into the accelerator pedal. However, all drivers said that once they learned to like the system, they discovered that they could travel more smoothly, and learned to control almost all acceleration and braking events with one pedal. They also discovered, thanks to the display panel information, that they recovered energy proportional to their expertise with the single pedal.
- 99% of respondents found home charging easy to use.
- 71% of respondents said they were more likely now to purchase an electric vehicle than they were a year ago, and only 9% said they are less likely.
- 88% of respondents said they are interested in buying a battery electric vehicle or plug-in hybrid electric vehicle in the next five years.

Oxford Brookes University

In August 2011 BMW published the results of the UK trials. The findings are based on the 40 test cars driven by 62 members of the public and 76 pool users, who together drove 258,105 miles (415,380 km) over two six-month periods. The data was collected electronically and the research was carried out by Oxford Brookes University. The following are some of the main findings:

- The Mini Es logged a daily journey distance of 29.7 miles (47.8 km), slightly more than the 26.5 miles (42.6 km) recorded by the control cars, a mix of Mini Coopers and BMW 116i models. The UK average daily distance driven for private cars overall is less than 25 miles (40 km).
- The average cost to charge over 6 months was £60, representing less than 2 pence per mile.
- Drivers did not charge their Mini E every night. The average was 2.9 times a week. Most charged at home, with 82% using their wall-mounted charging box 90% of the time.
- Four out of five people reported that 80% of their trips could be done exclusively in the Mini E, and this increased to 90% saying that with the addition of rear seats and a bigger boot, all their trips could have been done in the Mini E.
- 84% of the drivers said that the severe low temperatures during both phases of the field trial affected the distance that could be driven between charges, but despite that, four out of five participants told the researchers they thought the Mini E was suitable for winter use.
- When asked for suggestions to deal with the potential danger from the low noise at low speeds, more than half (56%) said that instead of an artificial noise, the driver should pay more attention. However just over a quarter (28%) said they’d like to have a warning noise below 12.5 miles per hour (20.1 km/h).
- The trial found that one week was all that was needed for customers to adapt to the characteristics and peculiarities of driving an EV, such as charging, range, regenerative braking and low noise.
- For fleet users who swapped out of their regular car reported that the Mini E was fine for 70% of journeys made during the working day, while the pool car success rate was even better with between 80 and 90% of regular trips achievable

=== Range record ===
As part of the 21st Century Automotive Challenge held at Penn State University on 23 May 2010, Mini E No. 466 achieved the longest trip in an electric car to date, achieving 147.3 miles (237.1 km). The Mini E went on to win the efficiency competition, traversing three mountain ranges in the rain.

== Alternative electric Mini ==
Nevada's Hybrid Technologies has started production of its electric-powered BMW Mini Cooper all-lithium model. The new electric Mini uses Hybrid Tech's own proprietary advanced lithium management and battery-balancing system. Top speed is only around 80 mph (130 km/h) but driving at a slower speed preserves battery-life and means owners will be able to travel up to 120 miles (190 km) on a single charge.

EVTV has published a free "how-to" series of videos documenting their conversion of a 2009 Mini Cooper Clubman to electric drive. The project uses a more powerful AC induction motor from MES-DEA and TIMS600 controller to provide 177 lb⋅ft (240 N⋅m) of torque. It uses 112 readily available Sky Energy 100 Ah LiFePO_{4} cells to provide an energy storage of 40.3 kWh and a range of 125 miles (201 km). Top speed of 120 mph (190 km/h). This is an open source project using parts readily available to anyone from existing suppliers and intended for those inclined to do their own conversion of an existing 2009 Mini Cooper Clubman.

CravenSpeed, of Portland, Oregon, US, has built and will offer instructions and parts for converting a 2002–2006 Hatchback Mini into an all-electric vehicle. Utilizing the existing transmission mated to a DC motor, their relatively inexpensive conversion kit will produce modest power and about an 80 km (50 mi) range per charge while keeping the rear seats and cargo room completely untouched.

== Motorsport ==
In April 2010, the Mini E, driven by Thomas Jäger, became the first electric car to lap the Nürburgring Nordschleife in under 10 minutes.

== See also ==
- BMW ActiveE
- BMW i
- BMW i3
- PML Mini QED, a 2006 electric concept car based on the Mini
- Government incentives for plug-in electric vehicles
- List of electric cars currently available
- List of modern production plug-in electric vehicles
- List of production battery electric vehicles
- Plug-in electric vehicle
- Smart ED
