= Peugeot e-208 =

Battery electric B-segment hatchback

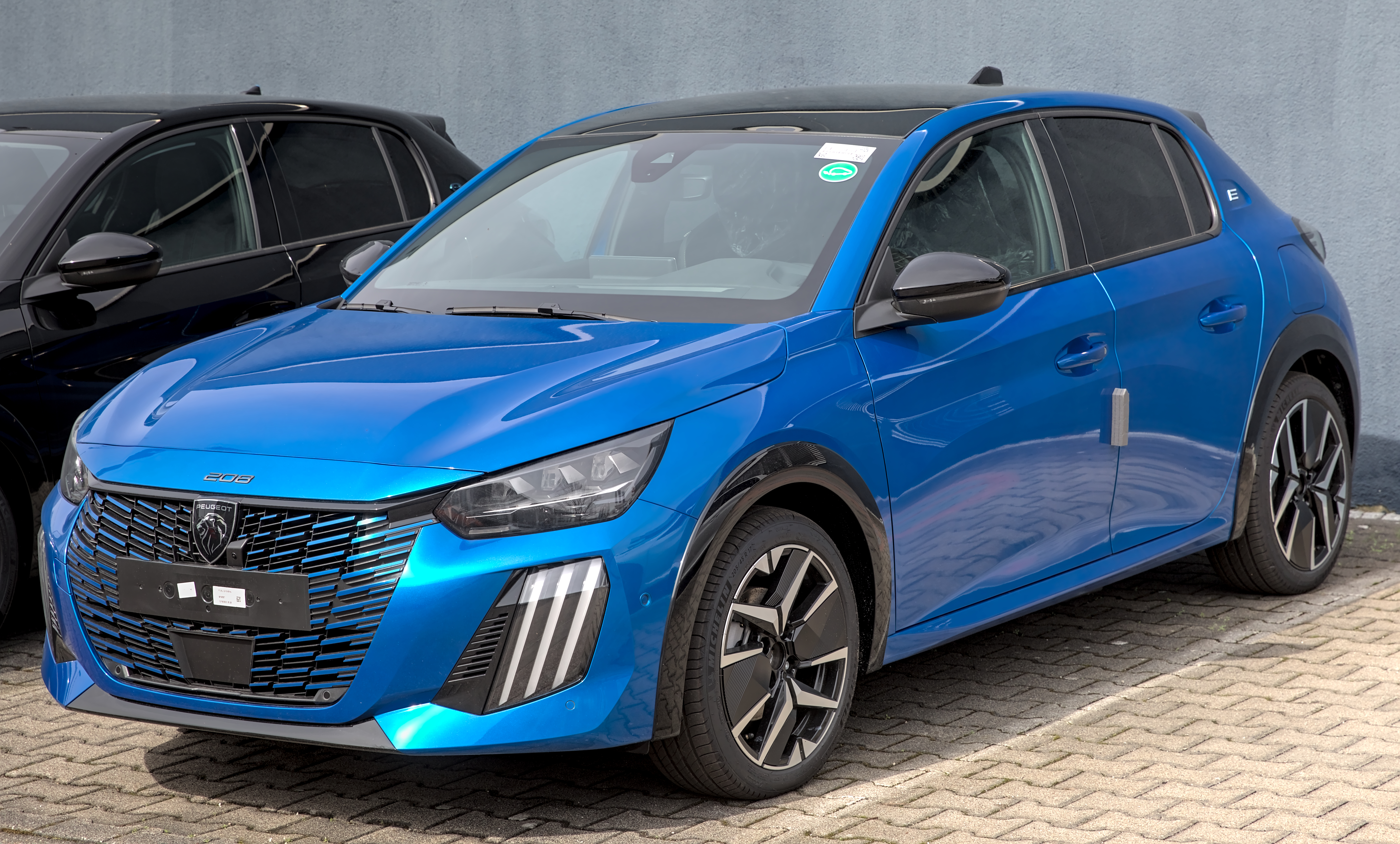
- Peugeot e-208 restyling 2023

Overview
- Manufacturer: Peugeot
- Production: 2019–present
- Assembly: Slovakia: Trnava
- Designer: Kevin Gonçalves; Yann Beurel; Eric Dejou

Body and chassis
- Class: Supermini (B)
- Body style: 5-door hatchback
- Layout: Front-motor, front-wheel-drive
- Platform: Common Modular Platform
- Related: Peugeot 2008 (P24); Opel Corsa F; Opel Mokka B; DS 3 Crossback; Citroën_C4; Lancia Ypsilon IV

Powertrain
- Electric motor: Permanent magnet synchronous motor : Electric 136 (since 2019); Electric 156 (since 2024)
- Battery: 50 kWh CATL NMC lithium-ion (136 HP); 54 kWh FinDream NMC Battery lithium-ion (156 HP - 2024-2025); 51 kWh CATL NMC Battery lithium-ion (156 HP - 2025-present)

Dimensions
- Wheelbase: 2,540 mm (100.0 in)
- Length: 4,055 mm (159.6 in)
- Width: 1,745 mm (68.7 in)
- Height: 1,430 mm (56.3 in)

Peugeot e-208 is the electric version of the popular Peugeot 208, initially introduced in 2019 at the Geneva Motor Show. The e-208 came with a 100 kW engine and a heat-pump controlled 50 kWh lithium-ion battery.

Peugeot e-208 was positively received by reviewers and the market. Sales exceeded Peugeot initial forecasts several times over.

Second generation Peugeot e-208 is expected to debut in 2026.

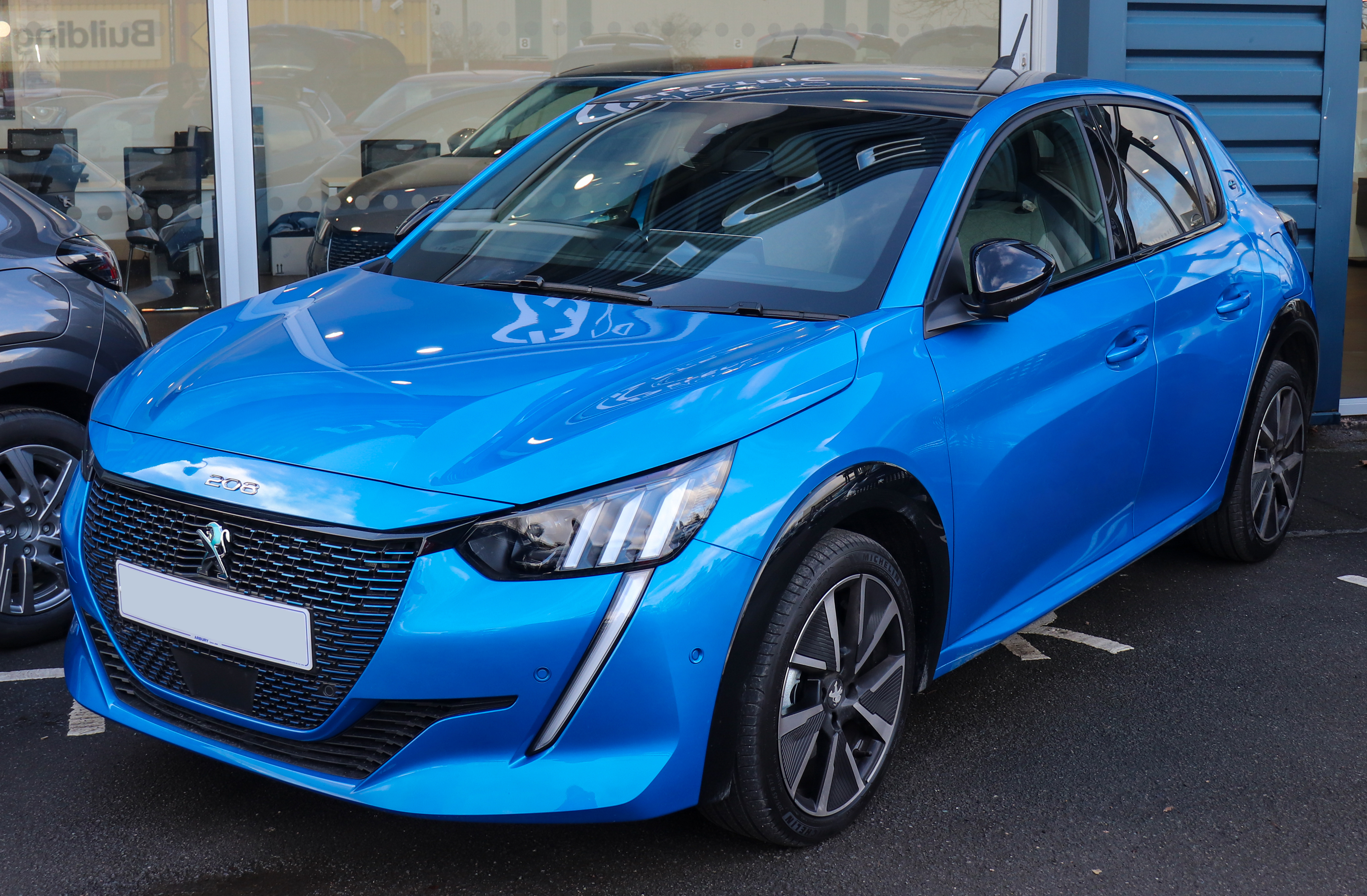
The pre-restyling version
