= German National Platform for Electric Mobility =

Logo

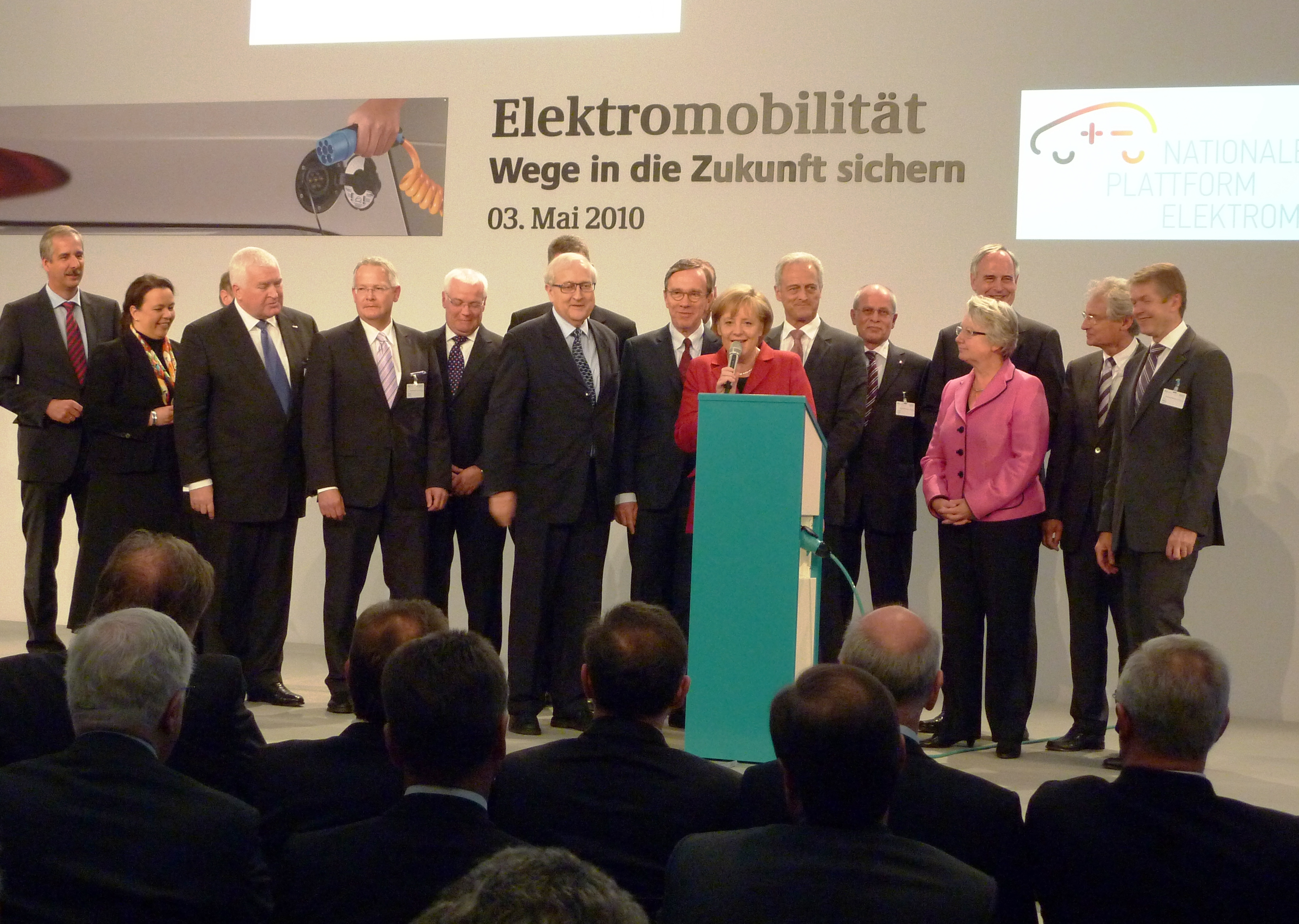
Inauguration meeting in Berlin on 3 May 2010

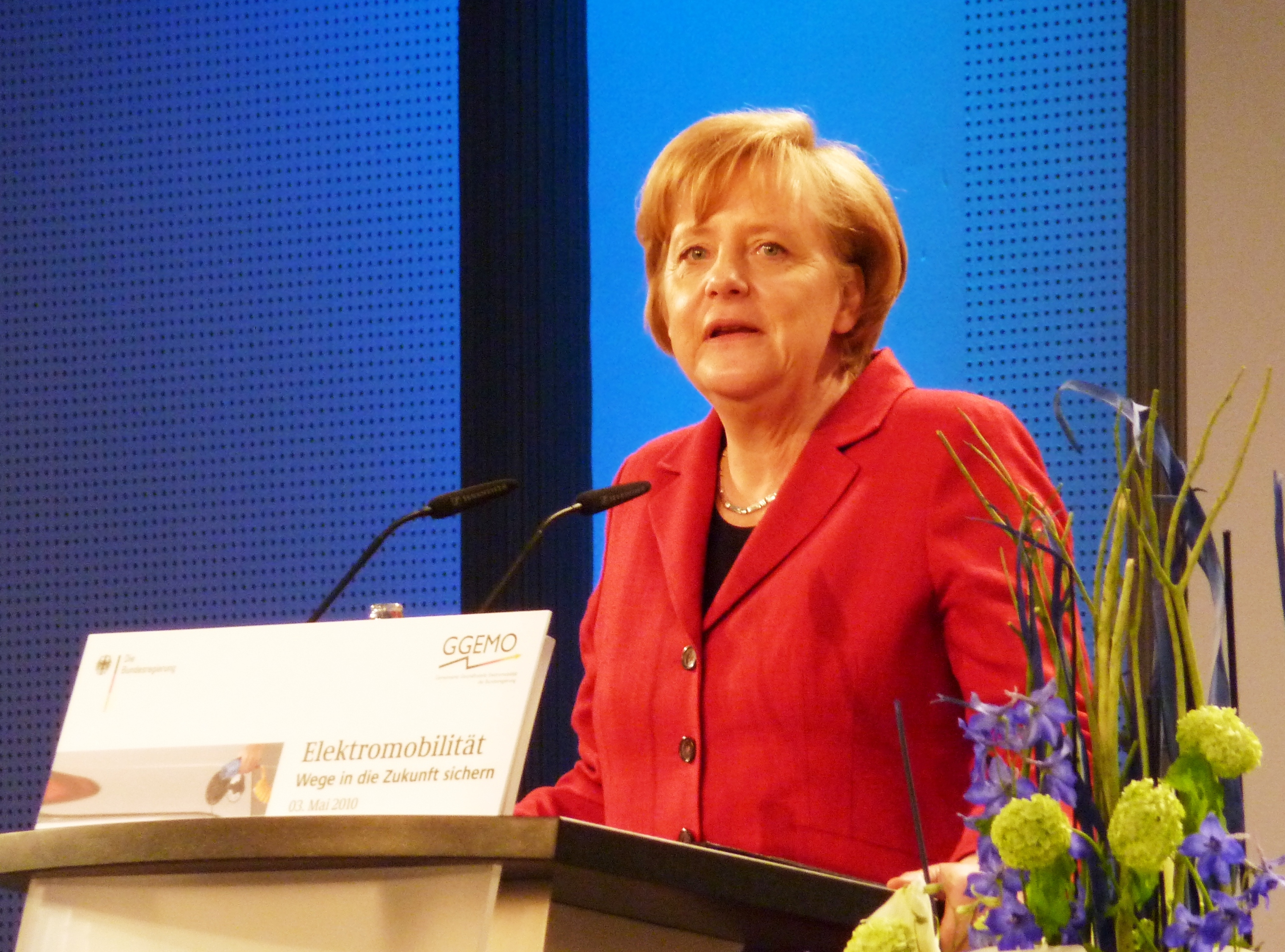
Keynote of Chancellor Angela Merkel

The German National Platform for Electric Mobility (German: Nationale Plattform Elektromobilität, NPE for short) is an advisory council of the German Federal Government for electric vehicle introduction. It consists of the top representatives of industry (10 members), politics (6), science (3), associations (3) and unions (1). It was officially established on 3 May 2010 during a meeting with German chancellor Angela Merkel. Its task is to push on the National Development Plan for Electric Mobility ("Nationaler Entwicklungsplan Elektromobilität"). The goal for 2020 of the NPE is to develop Germany to the leading supplier and lead market for electric mobility and to gain an employment effect of 30,000 additional jobs.

== History ==
The foundation for the promotion of electric mobility in Germany has been set with the Integrated Energy and Climate Programme of the Federal Government decided in 2007. Concrete measures were proposed in connection with the National Strategy Conference on Electromobility at the end of 2008. First fundings followed under the second economic stimulus package in early 2009. Before that, the industry had formed a so-called Innovation Alliance "LIB 2015". This industry consortium committed to invest 360 million euros for research and development of lithium-ion batteries.

The economic stimulus package brought up an amount of 500 million euros for projects in 15 topics. funded by the Federal Ministries of Economics and Technology (BMWi), of Transport, Building and Urban Affairs (BMVBS), for the Environment, Nature Conservation and Nuclear Safety (BMU), of Education and Research (BMBF) and of Food, Agriculture and Consumer protection (BMELV). The actual implementation was mostly coordinated by partners like the VDI/VDE-IT that already coordinated previous developments in electric mobility like research and development of batteries.

In September 2009 Annette Schavan, Federal minister of Education and Research, inaugurated the Forum Electric Mobility ("Forum Elektromobilität") as part of the joint project System Research for Electromobility of the Fraunhofer Society. The forum was assigned to pool the research and development efforts of the 33 Fraunhofer institutes together with the industrial partners. Until 2011 the schemes were funded with 30 million euros from the economic stimulus package. This support constitutes the first step of implementation of the National Development Plan for Electric Mobility.

The Federal Chancellery gave increasingly top priority to the National Development Plan for Electric Mobility. The Federal Ministry of Economics and Technology and the Federal Ministry of Transport, Building and Urban Affairs established the Joint Agency for Electric Mobility of the Federal Government on 1 February 2010 ("Gemeinsame Geschäftsstelle Elektromobilität der Bundesregierung"). With its kick-off it announced the foundation of the German National Platform for Electric Mobility, which was proclaimed on 3. May 2010.

Subsequently, the involved partners committed to establish cross-company and cross-sector working groups and to deliver a first interim report until the end of 2010. The coordination panels of the NPE could build on experts of the existing working groups of the German Commission for Electrical, Electronic & Information Technologies of DIN and VDE (DKE) of the Association for Electrical, Electronic and Information Technologies (VDE). The VDE Congress "E-mobility" on 8 and 9 December 2010 in Leipzig was used for technical consultation, from which the first interim report for the Federal Government has been derived. It describes the state of development and the expectations of the representatives of industry and research.

The second report was published in 2011. The report refined the details on development options and proposes support of different projects. In an early statement the German industry expressed the opinion that the current stimulation plan is insufficient to reach the defined goal of 1 million [electric vehicle|electric vehicles] in Germany by 2020. However, the report states that with the right incentive measures the goals of the NPE could still be reached.

At the International Conference of the German Government for Electric Mobility on 27 and 28 May 2013, the representatives of the Government confirmed the objectives and the planned financing and incentives. With its fourth report (Progress Report 2014 – Review of Pre-Market Phase) the NPE completed the pre-market phase (2010–2014) and showed the progress so far. At the same time the NPE presented a package of measures for the subsequent phase of the market-ramp-up (2015–2017), which showed how Germany could achieve the targets till 2020. The report stresses the need for additional incentives to reach the one million target.

In June 2015 the German Bundestag passed the first act on electric mobility ("Elektromobilitätsgesetz"). At the National Conference for Electric Mobility of the Federal Government in 2015, Chancellor Merkel announced a decision on further support measures for the end of the year. In spring of 2016 the decision on a support program was made, which directly addresses buyers of electric vehicles by financial incentives.

== Organisation ==
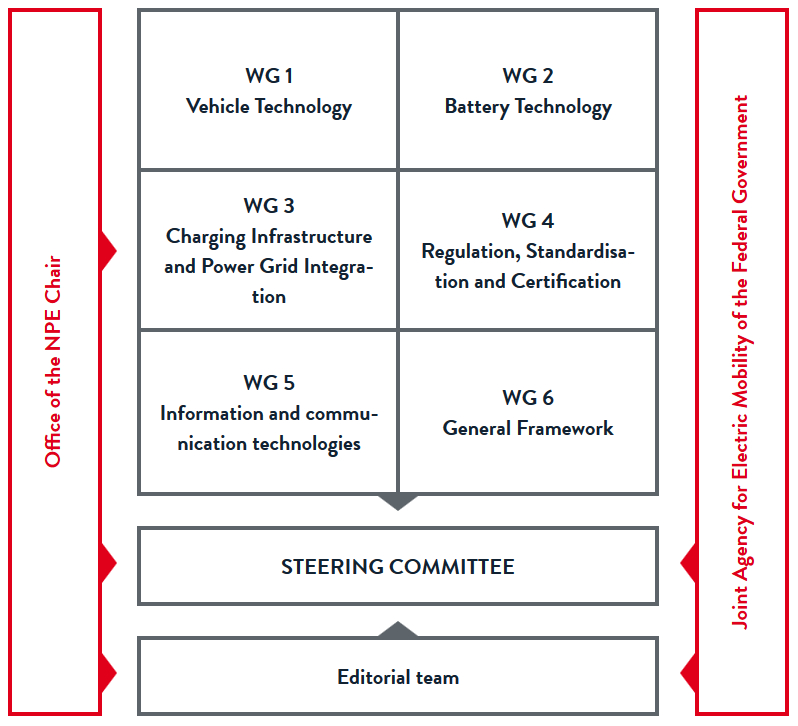
Organigram of the NPE

The platform consists of the steering committee, an editorial team and six topic-specific working groups. The steering committee coordinates the working groups. It is the decision-making body and reflects the structure of the NPE, which is made up of members of economy, science, politics and associations. Its members are the chairmen of the working groups, representatives of the federal government, the industrial circle electric mobility and the members of the editorial team. The editorial team supports the steering committee in the elaboration of reports and other publications of the NPE. The NPE is supported by the Federal Government's Joint Agency for Electric Mobility (GGEMO). The Office of the NPE Chair moderates the platform and coordinates the NPE communication.

== Approach ==
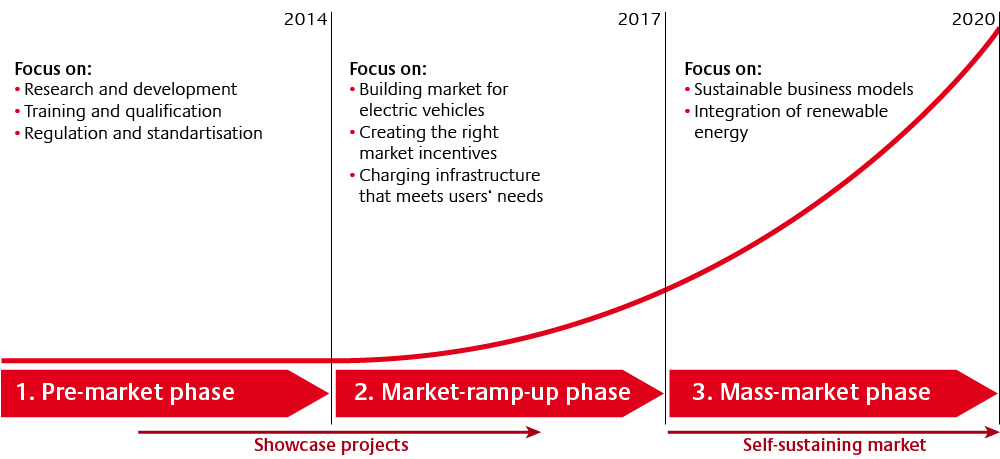
Phase model of the NPE

The NPE considers electric mobility as a total system of the components vehicle, energy supply, transport infrastructure and urban planning, which transcends the limits of traditional industry branches. This corresponds to the cross-sector and cross-disciplinary organization and operation of the NPE. The aim of the NPE is a self-sustaining market, which requires no political monetary support. To achieve the goals, the NPE recommends certain measures to the federal government and conducts regular reviews to their stage of development. The basis for their recommendations to support electric mobility is a three-phase model that reflects the different market stages.

== Tasks ==
The National Platform for Electric Mobility has the mandate to develop concrete proposals to achieve the objectives of the National Development Plan for Electric Mobility. Therefore, the six working groups address the following main topics:

- Drive technology
- Battery technology (e.g. Lithium-ion battery)
- Charging infrastructure and power grid integration (charging stations)
- Regulation, standardisation and certification (e.g. Combined Charging System)
- Information and communication technologies
- General Framework
- Education and qualification (now completed)
- Materials and recycling (partly finished, partly distributed on WG 1 and WG 2)

The experts in the working groups develop common positions and represent them in status analyzes, roadmaps and recommendation papers that summarize the need for action in electric mobility. The NPE hands over the publications to the federal government and opens it to the interested public. On 30 November 2010, a first interim report was published. The second report was published on 16 May 2011 and the third on 1 June 2012. The Progress Report 2014 – Review of Pre-Market Phase was passed to the Federal Government on 2 December 2014.

== Members ==
The members of the steering committee are (as at July 2016):

- chair industry
  - Henning Kagermann (acatech)
- chair government
  - Rainer Bomba (State Secretary, Federal Ministry of Transport, Building and Digital Infrastructure)
  - Matthias Machnig (State Secretary, Federal Ministry of Economics and Energy)
- members
  - Martin Brudermüller (BASF SE)
  - Roland Busch (Siemens AG)
  - Joachim Damasky (VDA)
  - Jochen Flasbarth (BMUB)
  - Klaus Fröhlich (BMW AG)
  - Ulrich Grillo (BDI)
  - Jörg Hofmann (IG Metall)
  - Stefan Knirsch (Audi AG)
  - Joachim Reichert (Gemeinsame Geschäftsstelle Elektromobilität der Bundesregierung)
  - Leo Schulz (Gemeinsame Geschäftsstelle Elektromobilität der Bundesregierung)
  - Georg Schütte (State Secretary, Federal Ministry of Education and Research)
  - Norbert Verweyen (RWE)
  - Achim Wambach (Centre for European Economic Research (ZEW))
  - Thomas Weber (Daimler AG)
  - Frank Welsch (Volkswagen AG)
  - Karsten Wildberger (E.ON SE)
  - Matthias Wissmann (VDA)

== See also ==
- Electric vehicle network for Germany
- Plug-in electric vehicles in Germany
- U.S. FreedomCAR and Fuel Partnership
