= Henning Kagermann =

German physicist and businessman (born 1947)

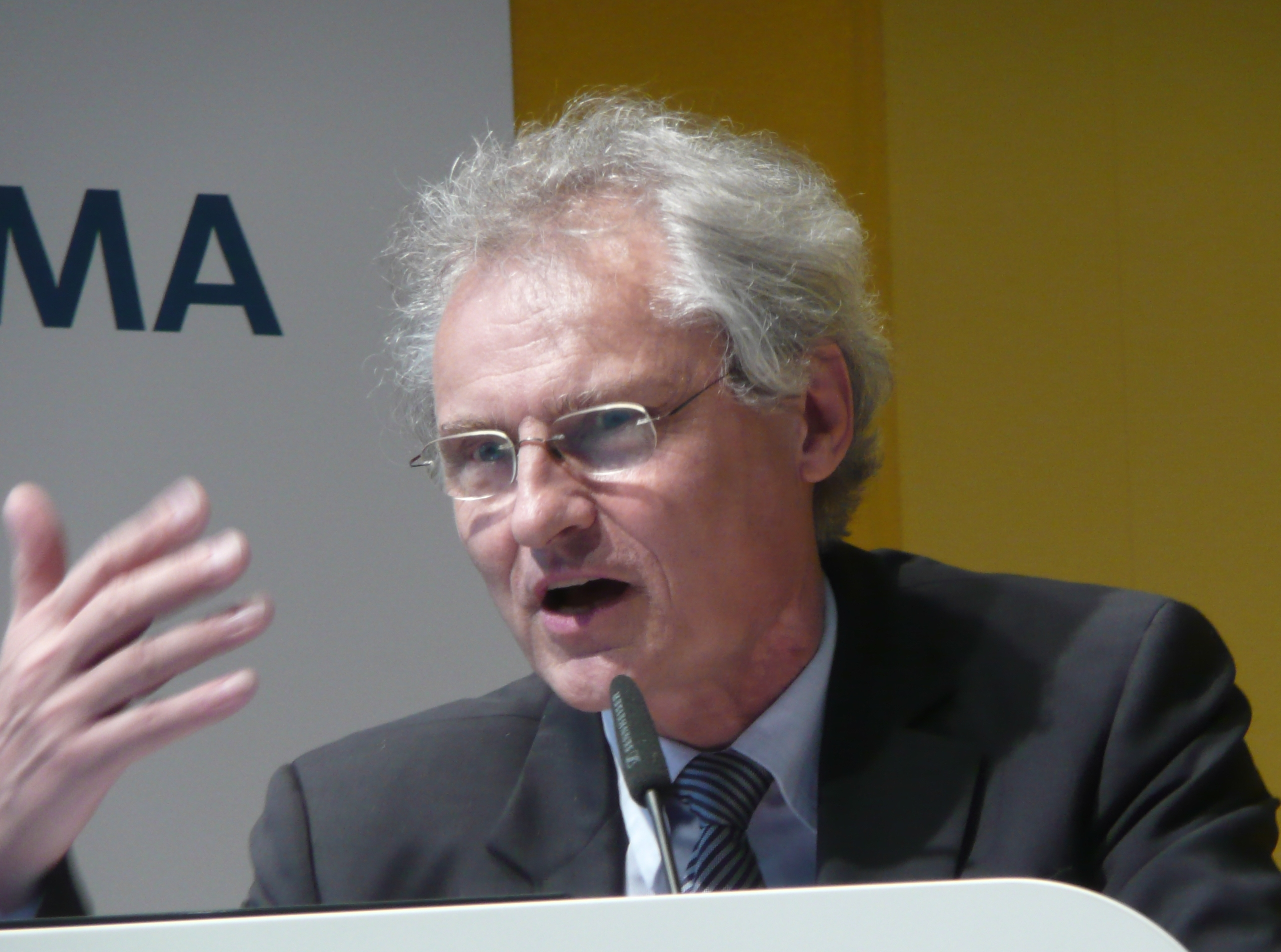
Kagermann in 2011

Henning Kagermann (born 12 July 1947) is a German physicist and businessman. He was the former chairman of the Executive Board and Chief Executive Officer of SAP.

== Early life and education ==
Born in Braunschweig, Kagermann studied physics in Braunschweig and Munich. He received his doctorate degree in theoretical physics in 1975 from the TU Braunschweig and was promoted to professor there in 1980. He taught physics and computer science at TU Braunschweig and University of Mannheim from 1980 to 1992.

== Career at SAP ==
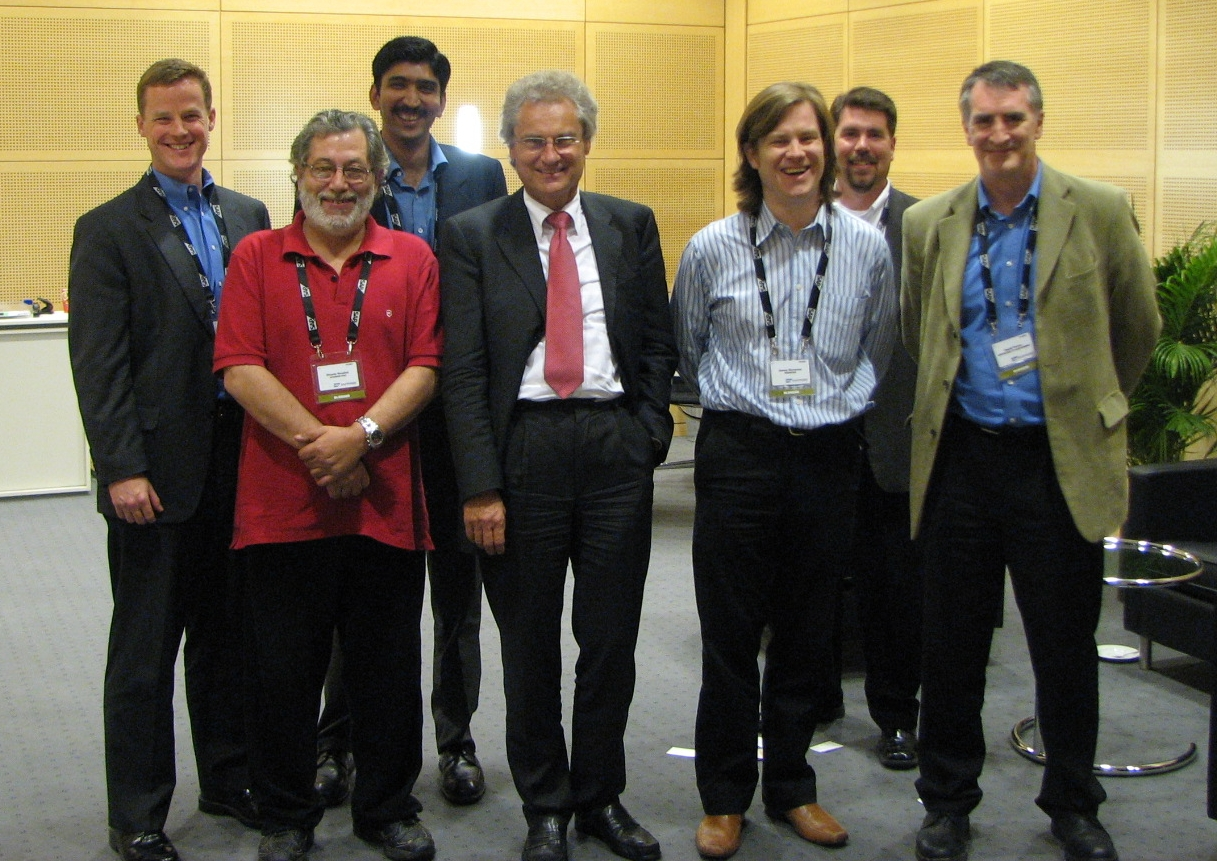
Henning Kagermann (center)

Kagermann joined SAP in 1982 and was initially responsible for product development in the areas of cost accounting and controlling. Together with Hasso Plattner, co-founder of SAP, he was co-chairman of the SAP Executive Board and CEO from 1998 to 2003. During that period, his responsibilities included sales, global customer relations, strategic development projects and consulting.

Following Plattner's election as chairman of the SAP Supervisory Board in May 2003, Kagermann became sole chairman of the SAP Executive Board and CEO. At the time, he had overall responsibility for SAP's strategy, business development and also oversaw the areas of global communications, global intellectual property, internal audit and talent management. In the following years, he increased SAP's share of the market for enterprise resource planning (ERP) programs with more than one function from 35% to 43%. Also under his leadership, SAP acquired Franco-US software BusinessObjects for €4.8 billion. In a 2005 reorganisation, Léo Apotheker assumed additional responsibility for marketing from Kagermann, who instead focused on strategy. In 2007, Kagermann's contract was extended to 2009. Shortly after, he overhauled the company's management again after the surprise resignation of Shai Agassi, its top software executive. For several months in 2008, he led the company alongside Apotheker instead. Kagermann retired in May 2009, when his term expired after several extensions.

== Political activities ==
During and after his time at SAP, Kagermann became a close adviser to Chancellor Angela Merkel on technology. From May 2010, he chaired the German National Platform for Electric Mobility. Later that year, Merkel appointed Kagermann to chair a working group on innovation policy. In 2014, he accompanied Merkel on an official visit to China.

In June 2009, Kagermann assumed the office of the president of acatech – German Academy of Science and Engineering. He is also known as one of the main proponents of the concept of Industry 4.0, which applies increased digitisation and the Internet of Things and Services to industrial production. In 2012, a working group led by Kagerman proposed the idea to the Federal Government of Germany.

In 2016, Kagermann was appointed by Federal Minister of Transport and Digital Infrastructure Alexander Dobrindt to serve on the German government's Ethics Commission on Autonomous Driving.

== Other activities ==
=== Corporate boards ===
- Mambu, Non-Executive Member of the Board of Directors (since 2018)
- KUKA, Member of the Supervisory Board (since 2017)
- WIPRO, Member of the Board of Directors (since 2009)
- Deutsche Post, Member of the Supervisory Board (2009–2019)
- Munich Re, Member of the Supervisory Board (-2019)
- Deutsche Bank AG, Member of the Supervisory Board (2000–2018)
- Haniel, Member of the Supervisory Board (2012–2016)
- BMW, Member of the Supervisory Board (2010–2015)
- Nokia, Member of the Board of Directors (2007–2014)

=== Non-profit organisations ===
- Deutsche Telekom Stiftung, Member of the Board of Trustees
- Lindau Nobel Laureate Meetings, Member of the Honorary Senate
- Technical University of Munich, Member of the Board of Trustees
- Max Planck Institute for Informatics (MPI-INF), Member of the Board of Trustees
- Max Planck Society, Member of the Senate

== Recognition ==
Kagermann holds an honorary doctorate from the University of Magdeburg.

== See also ==
- acatech
