= Plug-in electric vehicles in Germany =

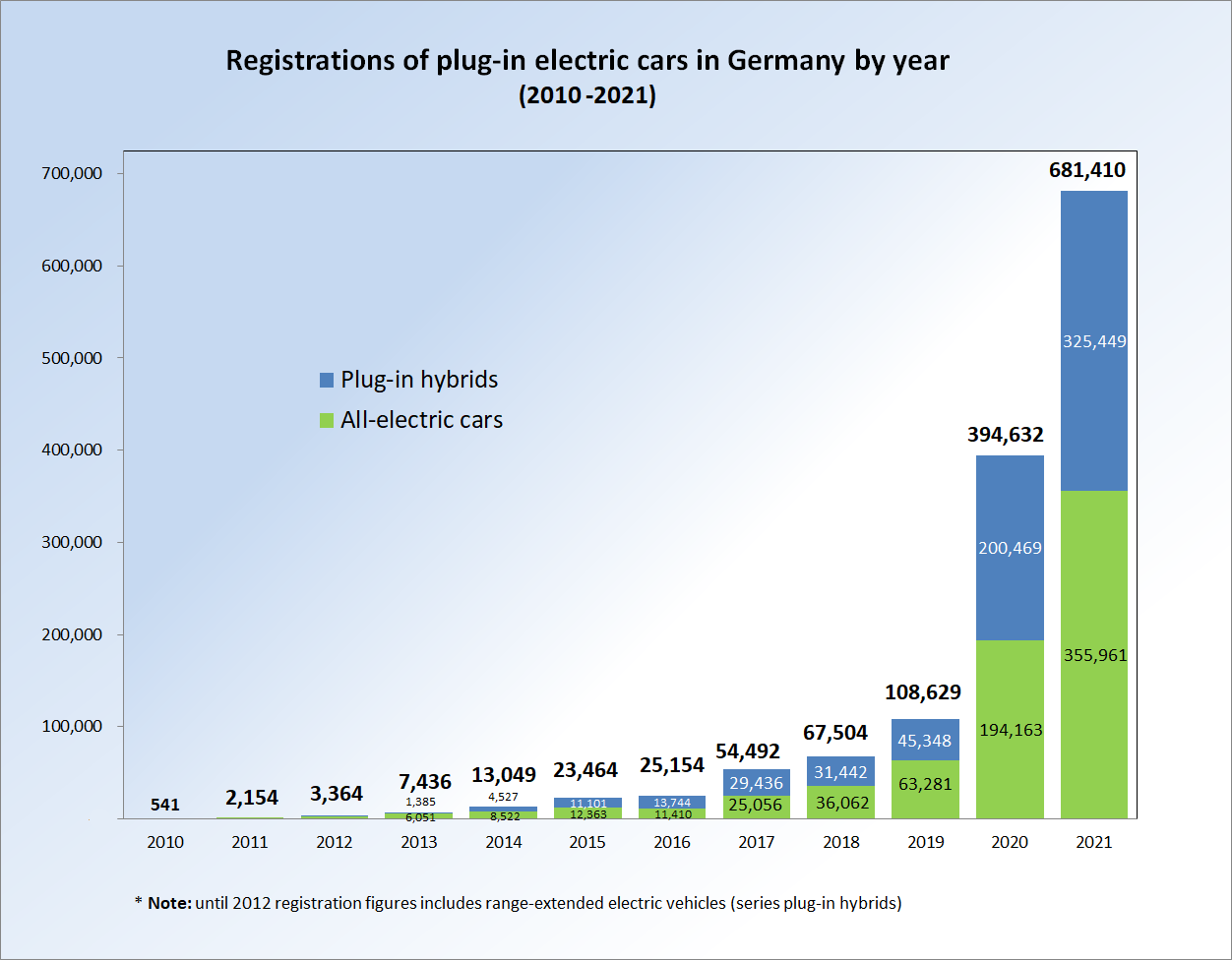
Annual registration of plug-in electric cars in Germany by type of powertrain between 2010 and 2021

The adoption of plug-in electric vehicles in Germany is actively supported by the German Federal Government. Under its National Platform for Electric Mobility, Chancellor Angela Merkel set an initial goal in 2010 to deploy one million electric vehicles on German roads by 2020, which was achieved with a six months delay in July 2021. Initially, the government did not provide subsidies to promote sales of plug-in electric vehicles, however, by the end of 2014 it was recognized that the country was well behind the set sales targets. A purchase bonus scheme was approved in 2016, but premium cars were not eligible to the incentive. In order to meet the climate targets for the transport sector, in 2016 the government set the goal to have from 7 to 10 million plug-in electric cars on the road by 2030, and 1 million charging points deployed by 2030.

In June 2020, and as a result of the economic impact of the COVID-19 pandemic, the government approved a recovery plan which included €8 billion to promote electric vehicle adoption and deployment of charging infrastructure. The purchase bonus for all-electric cars was raised temporarily from €6,000 to €9,000 for cars costing less than €40,000. There are lower bonuses for the purchase of plug-in hybrids, used cars and for leasing. The additional bonus will be available until the end of 2025.

The stock of plug-in electric cars in Germany is the largest in Europe, and represented 2.5% of all passenger cars on German roads on January 1, 2022. As of December 2021, cumulative sales totaled 1.38 million plug-in passenger cars since 2010, of which, 1.184 million were still in circulation at the beginning of 2022. As of December 2019, Germany had a stock of 21,890 light-duty electric commercial vehicles, the second largest in Europe after France. As of March 2020, the country had 27,730 public charging stations.

The plug-in electric car segment market share was 1.58% in 2017 and 1.9% in 2018. The segment market share rose to 3.10% in 2019, and despite the global strong decline in car sales brought by the COVID-19 pandemic, the uptake rate achieved a record 13.6% in 2020. As of 1 January 2021, the stock of German plug-in electric cars on the road totaled 588,944 units, representing 1.2% of all registered passenger cars, up from 0.5% the previous year.

In 2019, Germany surpassed Norway as Europe's top selling country market in terms of annual sales, and with a record volume of 394,632 plug-in passenger cars registered in 2020, up 263% from 2019, Germany listed for a second year running as the best selling European plug-in market. Both years, the German market led both the fully electric and plug-in hybrid segments. The only country that outsold Germany in 2020 was China. Sales in 2021 surged to 681,410 rechargeable units, capturing a record market share of 26.0%.

== Government incentives ==
In May 2010, under its National Platform for Electric Mobility, Chancellor Angela Merkel set the goal to bring one million electric vehicles on German roads by 2020. However, the government also announced that it would not provide subsidies to the sales of plug-in electric cars but instead it would only fund research in the area of electric mobility. As of April 2016, electric vehicles and plug-ins in Germany are exempt from the annual circulation tax for a period of five years from the date of their first registration. In 2016, the annual circulation tax exemption was extended from five to ten years, backdated to 1 January 2016.

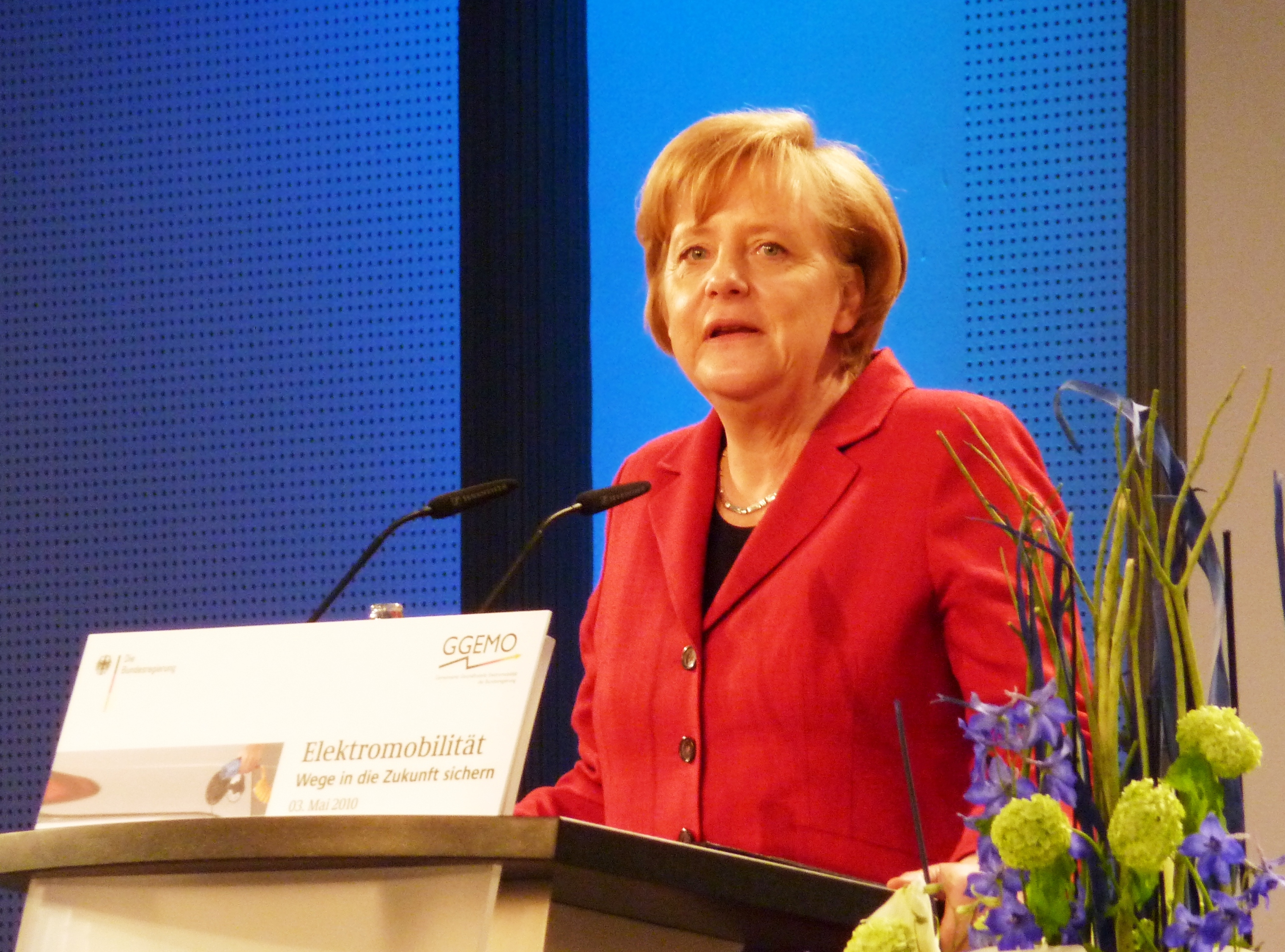
Chancellor Angela Merkel announced her goal to bring 1 million electric vehicles on German roads at the 2010 Electromobility Summit in Berlin.

The private use of a company car is treated as taxable income in Germany and measured at a flat monthly rate of 1% of the vehicle's gross list price. So plug-in electric cars have been at a disadvantage since their price tag can be as much as double that of a car using a conventional internal combustion engine due to the high cost of the battery. In June 2013 German legislators approved a law that ends the tax disadvantage for corporate plug-in electric cars. The law, backdated to 1 January 2013, allows private users to offset the list price with €500 per unit of battery size, expressed in kilowatt hours (kWh). The maximum offset was set at €10,000 corresponding to a 20 kWh battery. the amount one can offset will sink annually by €50 per kilowatt hour. As part of the package of financial incentives approved in 2016, private owners of plug-in electric vehicles that charge their cars in their employer premises are exempted from declaring this perk as a cash benefit in their income tax return. Employers who provide this perk are allowed to discount from their income tax a 25% of the lump sum value of the cash benefit. These two fiscal benefits apply only from 1 January 2017 until the end of 2020.

In August 2014, the federal government announced its plan to introduce non-monetary incentives through new legislation to be effective by early 2015. The proposed user benefits include measures to privilege battery-powered cars, fuel cell vehicles and some plug-in hybrids, just like Norway does, by granting local governments the authority to allow these vehicles into bus lanes, and to offer free parking and reserved parking spaces in locations with charging points. Not all plug-in hybrids will qualify for the benefits, only those with CO_{2} emissions of no more than 50 g/km or an all-electric range of over 30 km (19 mi) are eligible. The range criteria will rise to 40 km (25 mi) starting in 2018. The Bundestag passed the Electric Mobility Act in March 2015 authorizing local government to grant these non-monetary incentives, which are not mandatory. The law also provides issuing special license plates for electric vehicles to allow proper identification to avoid abuses of these privileges. As of March 2015, just 12 municipalities are considering to allow electric vehicles in the bus lanes in their jurisdiction. Most cities, including Hamburg and Munich, are not willing to allow electric cars in their bus lanes.

The special license plate authorized by the 2015 Electric Mobility Act adds the letter "E" at the end of the license number. Owners of all-electric cars and plug-in hybrids with a minimum all-electric range of 30 km (19 mi) can apply for the special license. The minimum range for eligible plug-in hybrids rose to 40 km (25 mi) from 1 January 2018.

According to the fourth progress report of the German National Platform for Electric Mobility, only about 24,000 plug-in electric cars were on German roads by the end of November 2014, well behind the target of 100,000 unit goal set for 2014. As a result, Chancellor Angela Merkel recognized in December 2014 that the government has to provide more incentives to meet the goal of having one million electric cars on the country's roads by 2020. Among others, the federal government is considering to offer a tax break for zero-emission company cars, more subsidies to expand charging infrastructure, particularly to deploy more public fast chargers, and more public funding for research and development of the next generation of rechargeable batteries.

=== Purchase incentives ===
==== 2016-2019 ====
At the beginning of 2016, German politicians from the three parties in Mrs. Merkel's ruling coalition and auto executives began talks to introduce a subsidy for green car buyers worth up to €5,000 (US$5,500) to boost sales of electric and plug-in hybrid cars. As of February 2016, the German government proposal is for the auto industry to cover 40% of the cost of the purchase subsidy. Private buyers would get the full €5,000 subsidy, while corporate buyers would receive €3,000 for each electric car, and the program is expected to run until 2020, the deadline set to achieve the goal of 1 million electric cars on German roads. Incentives will fall by €500 each year. In March 2016, Nissan Europe announced its support to the green car incentive and its commitment to double the government's E-premium incentive when buying a Nissan electric car, with a reduction of the purchase price of the same amount of the subsidy. Nissan Center Europe CEO said "we remain convinced that the goal of one million electric cars by 2020 is still achievable." According to Nissan if from now on electric car sales double every year until 2020, it is still possible to achieve the government goal.

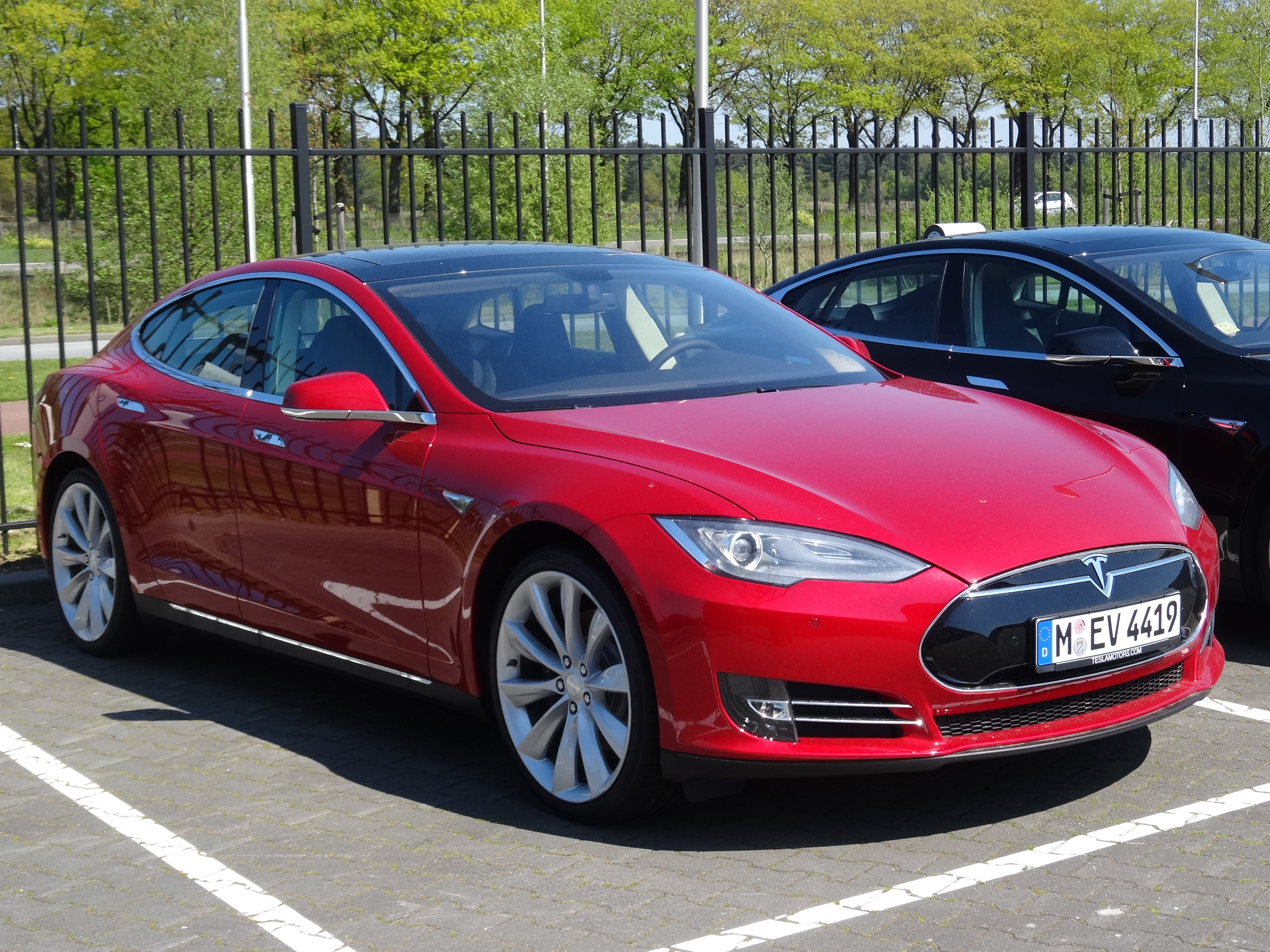
The Tesla Model S, and other premium cars are not eligible to the purchase bonus.

An incentive scheme to promote plug-in electric vehicle adoption was approved in April 2016 with a budget of €1 billion (US$1.13 billion). A total of €600 million (US$678 million) is reserved for the purchase subsidies, which are expected to run until all the money is disbursed, estimated to last until 2019 at the latest. Another €300 million (US$339 million) are budgeted to finance the deployment of charging stations in cities and on autobahn highway stops. And another €100 million (US$113 million) would go toward purchasing electric cars for federal government fleets. The program is aimed to promote the sale of 400,000 electric vehicles. The cost of the purchase incentive is shared equally between the government and automakers. Electric car buyers get a €4,000 (US$4,520) discount while buyers of plug-in hybrid vehicles get a discount of €3,000 (US$3,390). Premium cars, such as the Tesla Model S and BMW i8, are not eligible to the incentive because there is a cap of €60,000 (US$67,800) for the purchase price. Only electric vehicles purchased after 18 May 2016 are eligible for the bonus and the owner must keep the new electric car at least nine months. The same rule applies for leasing.

As of September 2016, BMW, Citroën, Daimler, Ford, Hyundai, Kia, Mitsubishi, Nissan, Peugeot, Renault, Toyota, Volkswagen, and Volvo had signed up to participate in the scheme. In May 2016, Nissan announced the company decided to raise the bonus with an additional €1,000 (US$1,130) to €5,000 (US$5,650) for customers of its all-electric Leaf car and e-NV200 utility van. The online application system to claim the bonus went into effect on 2 July 2016. As of September 2016, a total of 26 plug-in electric cars and vans were eligible for the purchase bonus. According to the Federal Office of Economics and Export Control (BAFA), a total of 4,451 applications have been made for the government subsidy for the purchase of a plug-in electric model as of 30 September 2016, consisting of 2,650 all-electrics and 1,801 plug-in hybrids. As of 30 September 2016, the federal states with the most claims are Bayern (1,130), Baden-Württemberg (873), and Nordrhein-Westfalen (726).

As of 1 September 2016, the following 26 plug-in electric cars and vans were eligible for the purchase bonus: Audi A3 e-tron, BMW 225xe, BMW 330e, BMW i3, Citroën Berlingo Electric, Citroën C-Zero, Ford Focus Electric, Kia Soul EV, Mercedes-Benz B-Class Electric Drive (B 250e), Mercedes-Benz C350 e, Mitsubishi i-MiEV, Mitsubishi Outlander P-HEV, Nissan e-NV200 5- and 7-seater Combi, Nissan Leaf, Peugeot iOn, Peugeot Partner Electric, Renault Kangoo Z.E., Renault Zoe, Smart Fortwo electric drive, Toyota Prius Plug-in Hybrid, Volkswagen e-Golf, Volkswagen e-Up!, Volkswagen Golf GTE, Volkswagen Passat GTE, and Volvo V60 Plug-in Hybrid. As of 30 September 2016, the models with the most applications are the Renault Zoe (876), BMW i3 (766), Audi A3 e-tron (462), BMW 225xe (440), and Mitsubishi Outlander P-HEV (353).

In order to meet the climate targets for the transport sector, in 2016 the government set the goal to have from 7 to 10 million plug-in electric cars on the road by 2030, and 1 million charging points available in Germany also by 2030.

==== 2020-2025 ====
As a result of the economic impact of the COVID-19 pandemic, the government approved in June 2020 an economic recovery plan with a budget of €130 billion, which included €8 billion to promote electric vehicle adoption and deployment of charging infrastructure.

As part of the stimulus plan, the purchase bonus for plug-in electric cars was raised by temporarily doubling the federal contribution of the environmental bonus until the end of 2021. The so-called "innovation bonus" increased the subsidy for new cars costing less than €40,000 from €6,000 to €9,000 for fully electric cars, and for plug-in hybrids from €4,500 to €6,750. This became the highest economic incentive granted in any European country, but there is a holding period, the vehicle must be registered in Germany for at least six months.

There are also lower bonuses available for leasing; new cars costing between €40,000 and €65,000; and also for used cars, provided no environmental bonus was granted in a previous purchase. In addition, other tax incentives for electric vehicles were introduced. In November 2020 the government decided to keep the innovation bonus until the end of 2025, but for plug-in hybrid cars to be eligible they must have a minimum electric range of 60 km (37 mi) from 2022 and at least 80 km (50 mi) from 2025. The initial one million goal was achieved with a six months delay in July 2021, including buses and commercial vehicles.

=== Controversies ===
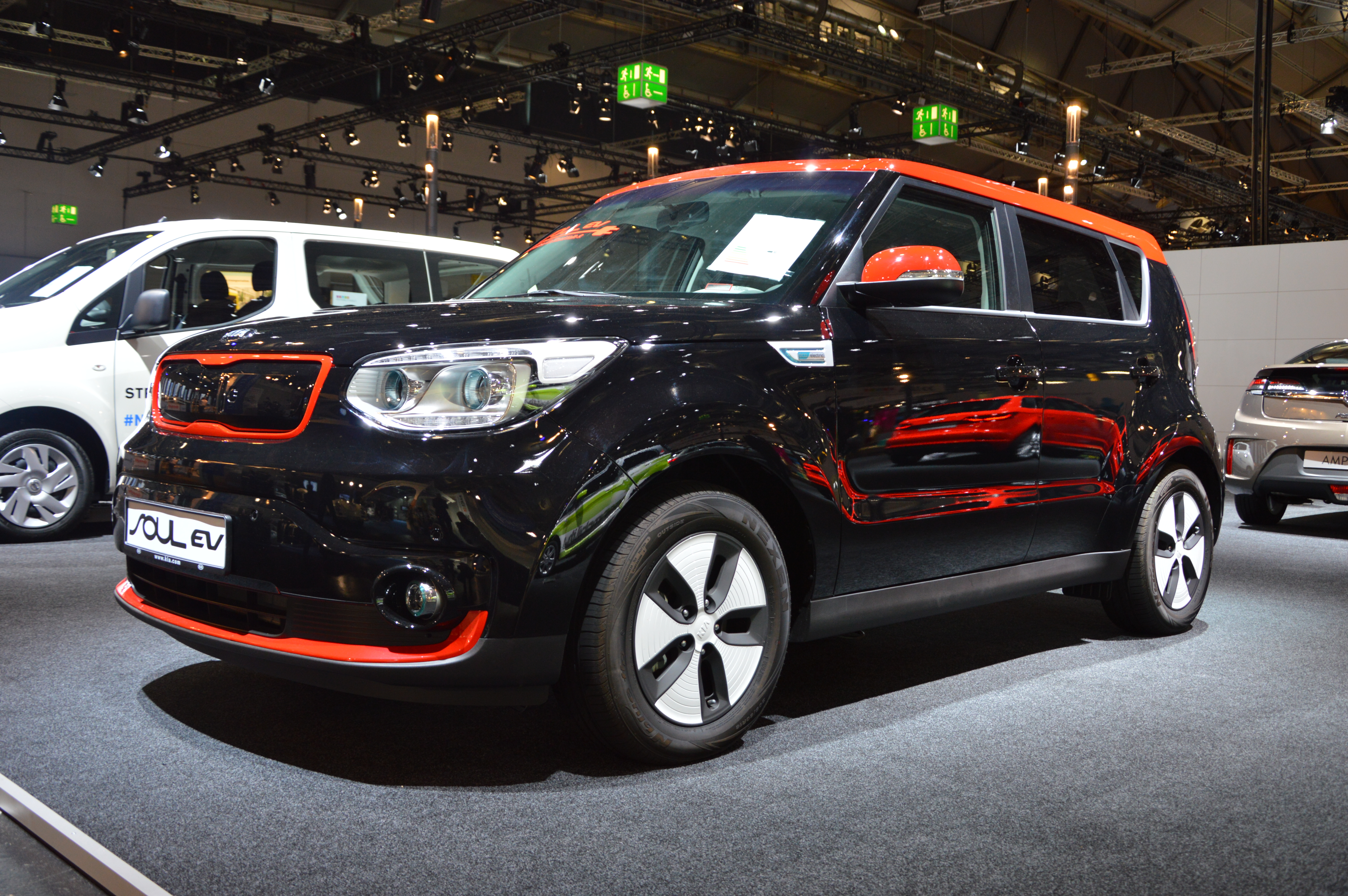
During 2015 a total of 2,044 used Kia Soul EVs were exported to Norway, mainly from Germany.

Loophole to EU regulations

According to Der Spiegel, by the early fourth quarter of 2015 the Kia Soul EV ranked as the top selling plug-in electric car in Germany during 2015 with 2,459 units sold, with almost 1,000 registered in October, nevertheless, there were actually only a few of them on German roads. At the time, about 1,400 Soul EVs had been shipped to Norway and sold as used cars, where availability of new Soul EVs was limited. According to the magazine, Kia Motors is registering the electric cars in Germany and then shipping them to Norway, which does not belong to the European Union, as a strategy to reduce the average CO_{2} fleet emissions of the entire Hyundai-Kia Group. This strategy allows the carmaker to comply with European Union regulations that mandate 130 grams of CO_{2} emission per km in 2015, and so they avoid to pay a fine of €70 million per year for each gram above the established average limit. According to German authorities this loophole is legal. A total of 2,044 Kia Soul EVs were exported to Norway as used cars during 2015.

=== National Platform for Electric Mobility ===
The German National Platform for Electric Mobility ("Nationale Plattform Elektromobilität") is an advisory council of the German Federal Government for electric vehicle introduction. It consists of the top representatives of industry (10 Members), politics (6), science (3), associations (3) and unions (1). It was officially established on 3 May 2010 during a meeting with German chancellor Angela Merkel. Its task is to push on the National Development Plan for Electric Mobility ("Nationaler Entwicklungsplan Elektromobilität"). The goal for 2020 of the NPE is to develop Germany to the leading supplier and lead market for electric mobility and to gain employment in the country.

== Charging infrastructure ==
By November 2014, Germany had 4,800 public charging stations. As of March 2020, the country had 27,730 charging stations. By June 2020, The German government is considering to mandate all petrol stations to offer electric car charging as part of its economic recovery plan due to the effects of the COVID-19 pandemic. The government expects to spend €2.5 billion euros on battery cell production and charging infrastructure as part of the national stimulus package.

Several pilot projects have been implemented based on partnerships of carmakers and utility companies. Daimler AG and utility RWE AG run a joint electric car and charging station test project in the German capital, Berlin, called "E-Mobility Berlin." They have set up 60 charging stations in Berlin (September 2009) and planned to expand the system to include 500 charging stations. Daimler has provided for 100 Smart electric drive cars to the project. The second phase started in November 2010. The RWE subsidiary "RWE Mobility" created cooperations with the automobilist club ADAC, car rental service Sixt and car park provider APCOA to equip all locations with charging stations. since mid of 2009. Renault joined the RWE Mobility program in September 2009 whereby the project goals of erecting charging stations were enlarged to mid of 2011 Renault's partner Nissan has joined the RWE-mobility program in June 2010 announcing that RWE will create a network of 1,000 charging stations until the end of the year 2010 focusing on the Berlin and Rhein-Ruhr region. In August 2010 a cooperation with fuel retailer PKN Orlen was announced – they planned to equip 30 gas stations in Hamburg with charging points for electric vehicles.

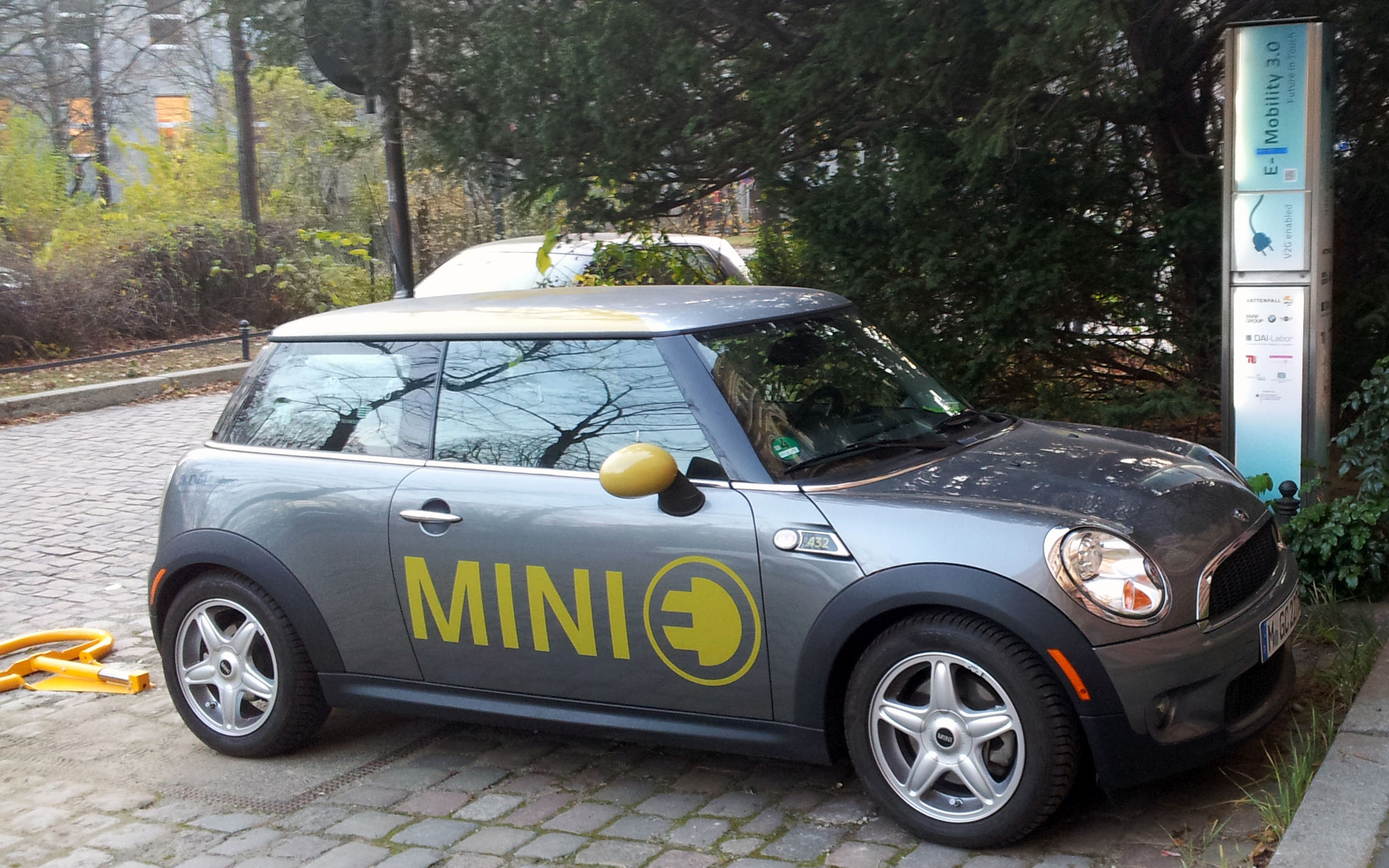
Mini E recharging in Germany

Carmaker BMW and utility Vattenfall run a joint electric car and charging test project with Mini E electric cars. A total of 100 trial vehicles were assigned. Testing in Berlin began in June 2009, and for the second phase, a total of 70 vehicles were delivered in March 2011 to private customers and fleet users. Field testing began in Munich in September 2010, for a leasing fee of €400 (approx. US$517) per month. Up to June 2011 there were 42 public charge points by Vattenfall in Berlin and the company is in the process of building 50 public charge points in Hamburg.

Carmaker VW and utility E.ON run a joint electric car and charging station test project in the German capital, Berlin and in Wolfsburg. The "Electric Mobility Fleet Test" was started as a research project with mostly partners in German universities using the VW hybrid cars (to be tested in 2010). E.ON has later joined also in the MINI E project providing the infrastructure in Munich which was started in July 2009. erecting an initial series of 11 charging stations (May 2010) enlarging it continuously (21 locations in December 2010). The region test in Munich has been extended with BMW i prototypes (BMW i3 and BMW i8) as well as Audi e-tron models (project eflott) in 2011. E.ON has announced to provide the eflott project with 200 public charging stations the Munich region.

Carmaker Daimler, the utility EnBW and the government of Baden-Württemberg announced in June 2010 to expand the "Landesinitiative Elektromobilität" program with the "e-mobility Baden-Württemberg" project that includes erecting 700 charging stations in the state until the end of 2011. Additionally there will be 200 electric vehicles added to the test including some electric trucks. The government of Baden-Württemberg has assigned €28.5 million to support EV research up to 2014. Meanwhile, EnBW has sponsored 500 E-Bikes in the Elektronauten project in 2010 which can use 13 charging stations in the Stuttgart region. EnBW has claimed to offer 250 charging stations for the Elektronauten 500 project in May 2011 although the map has not been updated. Bosch has developed a new charging station type for EnBW that is capable for 63A – the station was certified on 11. April 2011 by DEKRA and EnBW has announced to install 260 charge stations in the following weeks for MeRegioMobil project in Stuttgart and Karlsruhe. In November 2011 the Car2Go carsharing service announced plans to operate in Stuttgart in 2012 – EnBW reassured to have 500 charging spots ready in time with the roll out of the Car2Go vehicles in the second half of 2012.

== Sales ==
Cumulative light-duty plug-in electric vehicle sales in Germany compared to the world's top-selling countries and regional markets as of December 2021

As of September 2021, cumulative registrations in Germany totaled 1,178,178 plug-in electric passenger cars since 2010, consisting of 599,254 all-electric cars and 578,924 plug-in hybrids. In addition, Germany had a stock of 21,890 light-duty electric commercial vehicles in 2019, the second largest in Europe after France.

Germany listed as Europe's second best selling plug-in market in 2017, overtaking the French and the British markets for the first time, and again in 2018, ranked second after Norway. Germany topped plug-in car sales in the European continent in 2019, and with a record volume of 394,632 plug-in passenger cars registered in 2020, up 263% from 2019, Germany listed for a second year in-a-row as the best selling European country market. The German market topped both the fully electric and plug-in hybrid segments. By the end of 2020, Germany had the world's third largest plug-in car stock after China and the U.S.

The plug-in electric car segment market share was 1.58% in 2017 and 1.9% in 2018. The segment market share rose to 3.10% in 2019, and despite the global strong decline in car sales brought by the COVID-19 pandemic, the uptake rate achieved a record 13.6% in 2020.

The official German definition of electric vehicles changed at the beginning of 2013, before that, official statistics only registered all-electric vehicles because plug-in hybrids were accounted together with conventional hybrids. As a result, the registrations figures for 2012 and older do not account for total new plug-in electric car registrations.

=== 2011-2012 ===
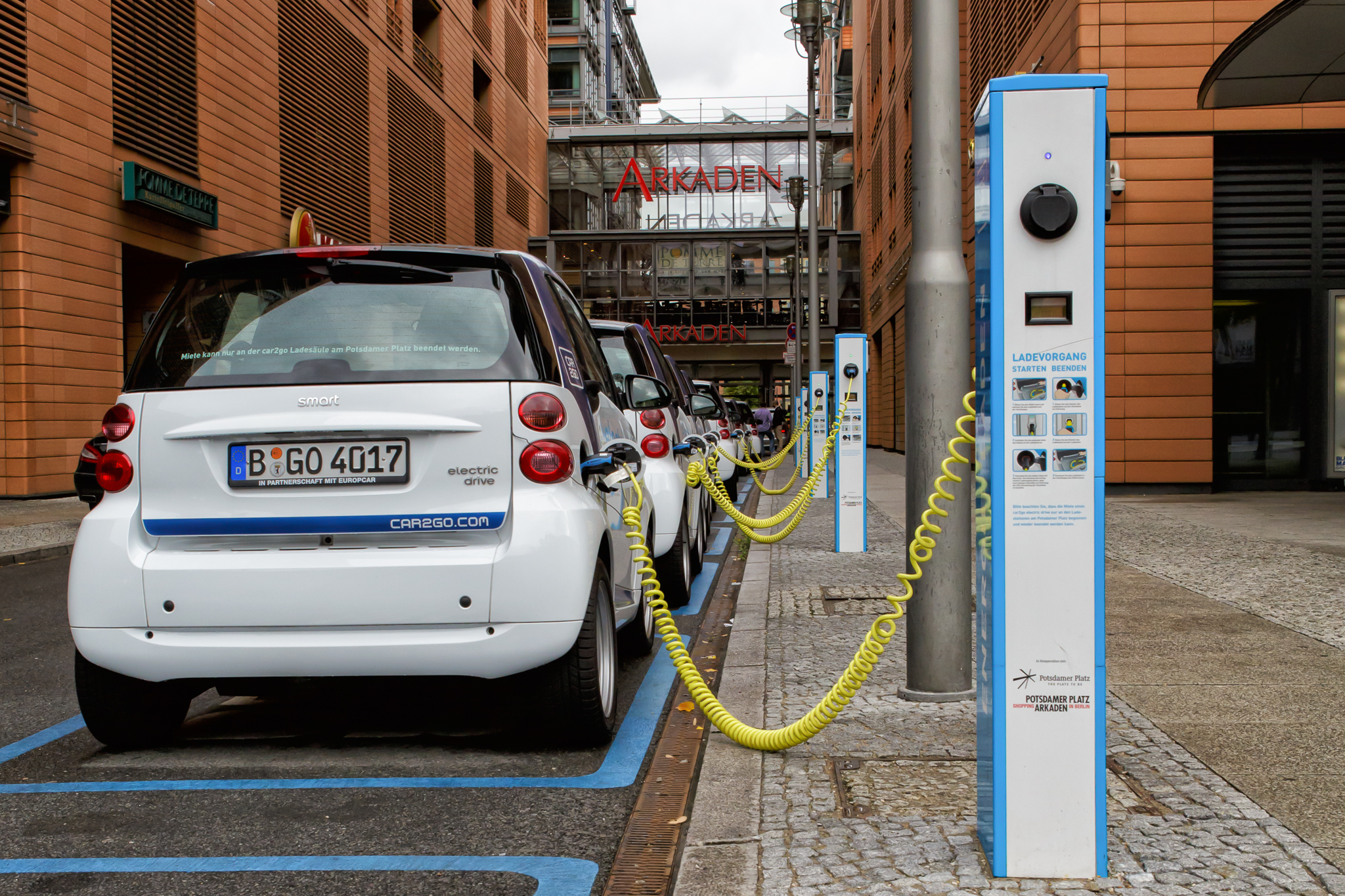
As of December 2013, the Smart electric drive led the plug-in electric car segment in Germany with 2,952 units registered.

During 2011, a total of 2,154 pure electric cars were registered in the country, up from 541 units in 2010. All-electric car sales for 2011 were led by the Mitsubishi i-MiEV family with 683 i-MiEVs, 208 Peugeot iOns and 200 Citroën C-Zeros, representing 50.6% of all electric car registrations in 2011. Plug-in hybrid registrations totaled 266 units in 2011, 241 Opel Amperas and 25 Chevrolet Volts, for a total of 2,420 plug-in electric vehicles registered in 2011.

A total of 2,956 all-electric vehicles were registered in Germany during 2012, a 37.2% increase over 2011. When 901 registered plug-in hybrids are accounted for, 2012 registrations climb to 3,857 units, and sales of plug-in electric car represented a 0.12% market share of new passenger vehicles sold in the country in 2012. Most sales in the country were made by corporate and fleet customers and 1,493 all-electric vehicles were registered by the automobile industry, as demonstration or research vehicles. Registrations of plug-in electric-drive vehicles were led by the Opel Ampera extended-range electric car with 828 units, followed by the Smart electric drive with 734 units. In addition, a total of 2,413 Renault Twizys were sold during 2012, making Germany the top selling European market for the electric quadricycle.

=== 2013-2015 ===
A total of 7,436 new plug-in electric cars were registered in Germany in 2013, consisting of 6,051 all-electric cars and 1,385 plug-in hybrids. Total registrations at the end of 2013 reached 12,156 units. The market share of plug-in electric passenger cars increased to 0.25% in 2013 from 0.12% in 2012. The Smart electric drive led new plug-in car registrations in 2013 with 2,146 units, followed by Renault Zoe with 1,019, the Nissan Leaf with 855 units, and the BMW i3 with 559.

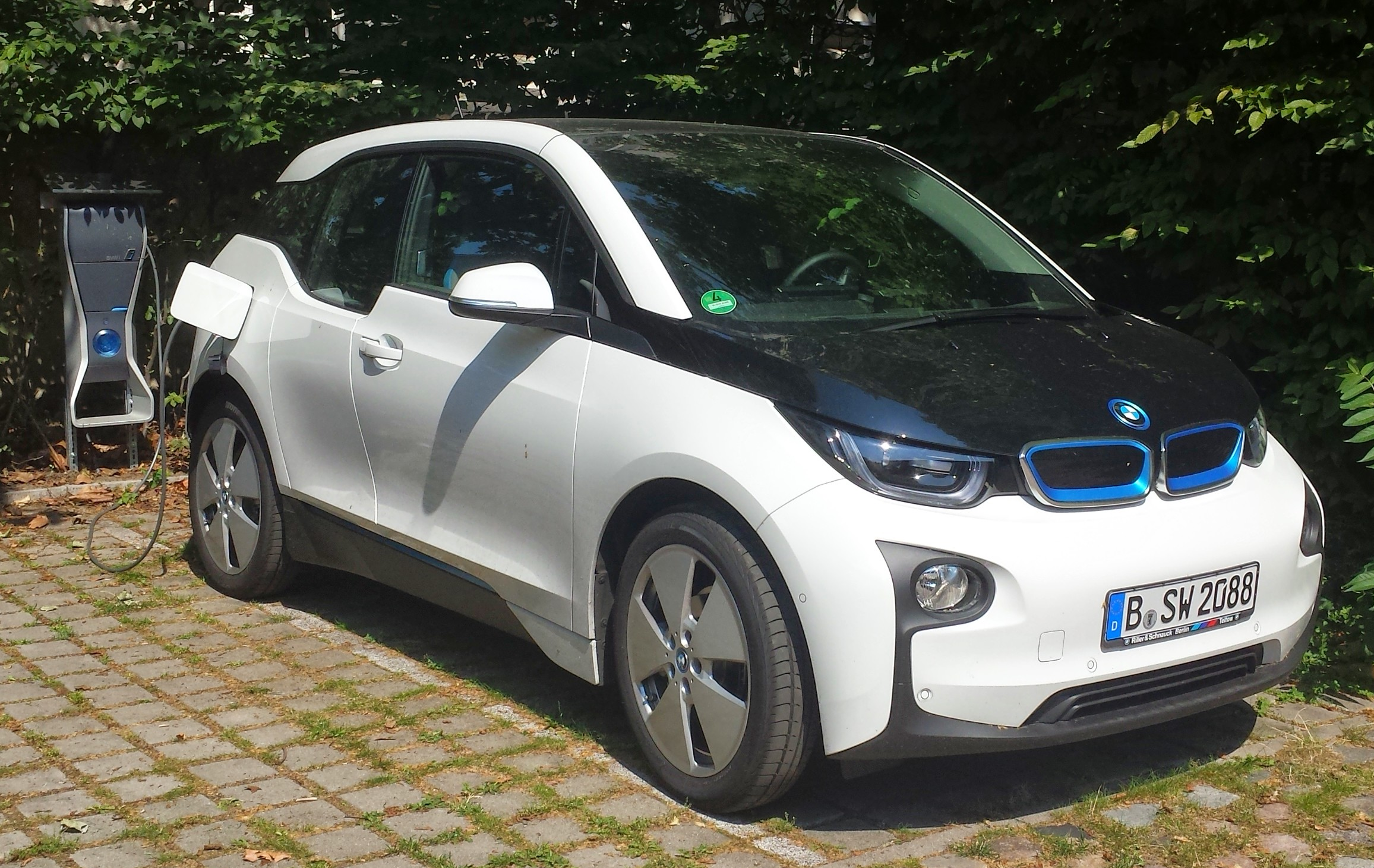
The BMW i3 led plug-in car registrations in 2014 and again in 2016.

Registrations of plug-in electric cars totaled 13,049 units in 2014, consisting of 8,522 all-electric cars and 4,527 plug-in hybrids. The plug-in segment achieved a market share of 0.4% of new car sales that year. The BMW i3 ended 2014 as the top selling plug-in electric car with 2,233 units registered, followed by the Smart Fortwo ED with 1,589, and the Renault Zoe with 1,498. Accounting for registrations of plug-in electric cars between January 2010 and June 2014, the leading model was the Smart electric drive with 3,959 units, with a significant number in use by carsharing services, followed by the BMW i3 with 1,937 units, Nissan Leaf with 1,693 units, Renault Zoe with 1,532, and Opel Ampera with 1,450 units.

Plug-in hybrid registrations totaled 11,101 units in 2015, up 145% from 2014, and all-electric cars totaled 12,363 units registered, up 45% from 2014. Combined sales of the two segments totaled 23,464 units. The plug-in segment achieved a market share of 0.7% of new car sales that year, up from 0.4% in 2014. Registrations totaled 3,176 plug-in cars in December 2015, achieving both, the highest monthly sales volume ever and a record market share of 1.28% of new car registrations that month. The top selling models in 2015 were the Kia Soul EV with 3,839 units, followed by the BMW i3 with 2,271, the Mitsubishi Outlander P-HEV with 2,128, the Volkswagen Golf GTE with 2,109 and the Audi A3 e-tron with 1,839.

The magazine Der Spiegel questioned whether the Kia Soul EV was actually the top selling plug-in electric car in the country, as about 2,000 electric cars were registered in Germany and then imported to Norway as used cars, as part of a strategy of the Hyundai-Kia Group to comply with European Union CO_{2} regulations. (see Controversies section above). There were about 50,000 plug-in electric cars registered in Germany by the end of 2015.

=== 2016-2017 ===
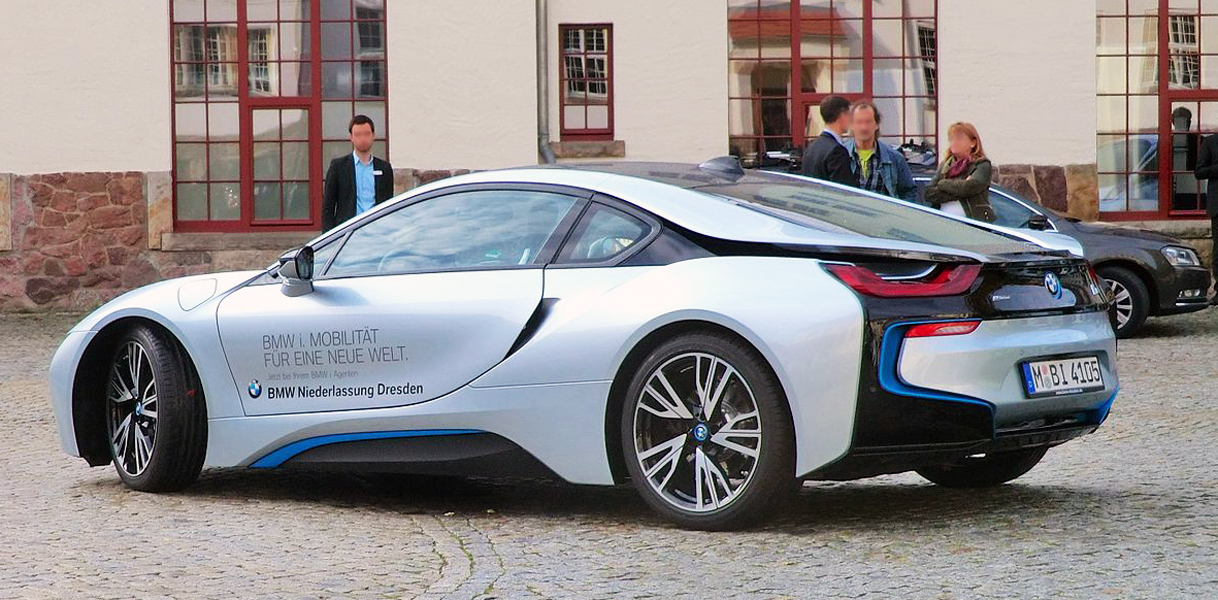
Germany is the world's third largest market for the BMW i8, with 972 units registered as of August 2016.

During the first three quarters of 2016, sales of plug-in hybrids surpassed sales of all-electric cars for the first time in the country with a total of 17,074 units were registered. The introduction of the purchase bonus did not produce immediate effect on plug-in car sales until September 2016, when registrations peaked at 3,061 units. Combined registrations of both type of plug-in accounted for 1.1% of new car registrations, allowing the German plug-in market share to pass the 1% mark for the first time during 2016.

A total of 25,254 plug-in cars were registered in 2016 consisting of 13,744 plug-in hybrids and 11,410 all-electric cars, representing a market share of 0.72% of new car registrations that year. The top selling models in 2016 were the BMW i3 (2,863), Renault Zoe (2,805), Audi A3 e-tron (1,615), Tesla Model S (1,474), and Mitsubishi Outlander P-HEV (1,436).

A record of 54,492 plug-in cars were registered in 2017, up 217% the previous year, and consisting of 29,436 plug-in hybrids and 25,056 all-electric cars. The top selling models in 2017 were the Audi A3 e-tron (4,454), Renault Zoe (4,322), and BMW i3 (4,319). Registrations achieved a record market share of 1.58% in 2017.

=== 2019 ===
A total of 108,629 plug-in electric passenger cars were sold in Germany in 2019, consisting of 45,348 plug-in hybrids and 63,321 all-electric cars. The plug-in segment market share achieved a record 3.1% of new car sales in 2019, with all-electric cars representing 1.8%, and plug-in hybrids 1.3%. In 2019, Germany surpassed Norway as the best selling plug-in market in terms of annual sales, leading both the all-electric and the plug-in hybrid segments.

=== 2020 ===
Despite the global strong decline in car sales brought by the COVID-19 pandemic, new plug-in electric car sales in Germany between January and September 2020 achieved record registrations with a total of 204,251 units sold, consisting of 105,882 plug-in hybrids and 98,369 all-electric cars. The plug-in market share achieved a record of 15.6% of new car sales, and the global market share for the first nine months of 2020 attained 10%, 5.2% for plug-in hybrids and 4.8% for battery electric cars.

The top selling electric models in 2020 were the Renault Zoe (30,376), VW e-Golf (17,438), the Tesla Model 3 (15,202), the new VW ID.3 (14,493), and the Hyundai Kona (14,008). As of December 2020, cumulative sales totaled about 700,000 plug-in passenger cars since 2010.

=== 2021 ===
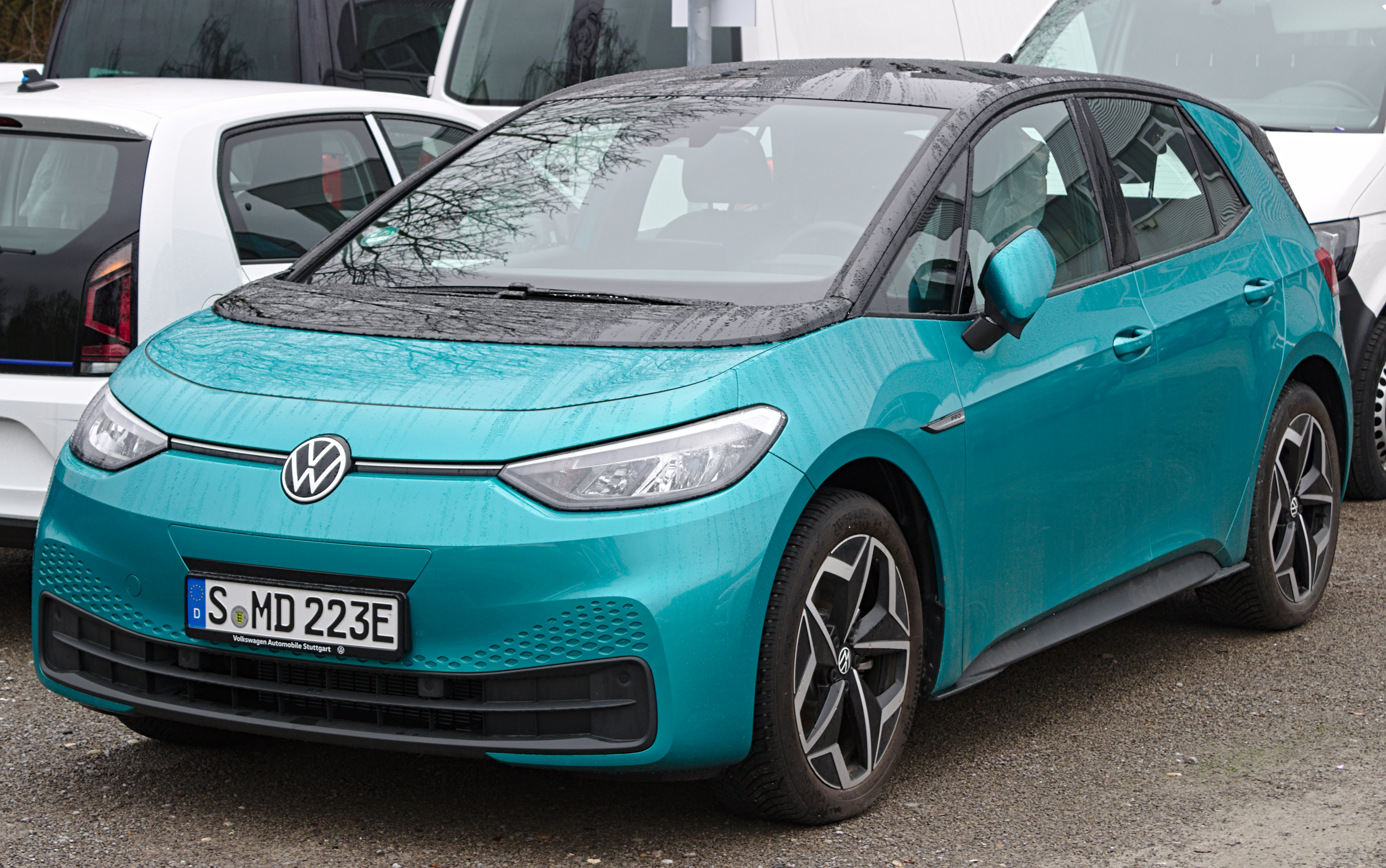
The Volkswagen ID.3 listed among Germany's top 3 best selling all-electric cars in 2021.

There were 588,944 plug-in electric cars in circulation on 1 January 2021, representing 1.2% of all cars on the road in Germany, up from 0.5% the previous year. The stock of plug-in cars in use consisted of 309,083 fully electric cars and 279,861 plug-in hybrids. The milestone of 1 million plug-in electric vehicles on the road, including buses and commercial vehicles, was reached in July 2021. The German fleet in use consisted of 54% all-electric vehicles and 46% plug-in hybrids.

Despite the continued global decline in car sales brought by the shortages related to the COVID-19 pandemic, and computer chips in particular, a record 681,410 plug-in electric passenger cars were registered in Germany in 2021, consisting of 325,449 plug-in hybridsand 355,961 all-electric cars, allowing the segment's market share to surge to 26.0%.

The top selling all-electric model in 2021 was the Tesla Model 3 (35,262), followed by the Volkswagen E-up (35,262), and the Volkswagen ID.3 (26,693), The best selling plug-in hybrid was the Mercedes GLK, GLC (33,719). As of December 2021, cumulative sales totaled 1.38 million plug-in passenger cars since 2010.

=== 2022 ===
On 1 January 2022, there were 1,184,416 plug-in electric cars in circulation in Germany, representing 2.5% of all cars on German roads., up from 0.5% the previous year. The stock of plug-in cars in use consisted of 618,460 all-electric cars and 565,956 plug-in hybrids.

== Top selling models by year ==
The following table presents registrations of the top selling highway-capable plug-in electric cars available for retail customers by year between 2010 and June 2014.

Registration of highway-capable plug-in electric cars by model in Germany between 2010 and June 2014
Model	Total 2010-2014^{(1)}	2Q 2014	2013	2012	2011	2010
Smart electric drive	3,959	645	2,146	734	328	106
BMW i3	1,937	1,378	559			
Nissan Leaf	1,693	380	855	451	7	
Renault Zoe	1,532	513	1,019			
Opel Ampera	1,450	46	335	828	241	
Volkswagen e-Up!	1,034	884	150			
Citroën C-Zero	950	17	276	454	200	3
Mitsubishi i MiEV	910	56	89	71	683	11
Tesla Model S	637	446	191			
Peugeot iOn	520	0	48	263	208	1
Mitsubishi Outlander P-HEV	507	507				
Volvo V60 Plug-in Hybrid	316	243	73			
Renault Fluence Z.E.	273	0	60	213		
Volkswagen e-Golf	231	231				
Tesla Roadster	190			67	100	23
BMW ActiveE	124			11	113	
Chevrolet Volt	73	0	25	23	25	
Porsche Panamera S E-Hybrid	63	51	12			
BMW i8	55	55				
Ford Focus Electric	51	16	35			
Fisker Karma	50			50		
Tazzari Zero	50				50	
Volvo C30 Electric	21	9	0	12		
Total and registrations by year	17,919^{(2)}	5,763	7,436	2,956^{(2)}	2,154^{(2)}	541^{(2)}
Notes: (1) CYTD: current year-to-date sales through June 2014. (2) The official KBA registration numbers only registered all-electric vehicles before 2013 (plug-in hybrids were accounted together with conventional hybrids). As a result, these figures do not include plug-in hybrids, and the cumulative total does not reflect actual all new plug-in electric car registrations before 2013.

== See also ==
- Electric vehicle network for Germany
- Government incentives for plug-in electric vehicles
- List of modern production plug-in electric vehicles
- Nationale Plattform Elektromobilität
- Renewable energy in Germany
