= German Climate Action Plan 2050 =

German climate protection policy

The German Climate Action Plan 2050 (German: Klimaschutzplan 2050) is a climate protection policy document approved by the German government on 14 November 2016. The plan outlines measures by which Germany can meet its various national greenhouse gas emissions reduction goals through to 2050 (see table) and service its international commitments under the 2016 Paris Climate Agreement. The Federal Ministry for the Environment, Nature Conservation, Building and Nuclear Safety (BMUB), under minister Barbara Hendricks, led the development of the plan. The plan was progressively watered down since a draft was first leaked in early May 2016. Projections from the environment ministry in September 2016 indicate that Germany will likely miss its 2020 climate target.

The Climate Action Plan 2050 should not be confused with an earlier document, the Climate Action Programme 2020 (Aktionsprogramm Klimaschutz 2020), approved in December 2014 and which only covers the period until 2020. In early 2017 it was agreed that the 2020 Programme would be scrapped.

== Climate targets ==
Germany announced the following official greenhouse gas emissions targets on 28 September 2010.

Greenhouse gas policy targets for Germany (with actual figures for 2014)
| Target | 2014 | 2020 | 2030 | 2040 | 2050 |
|---|---|---|---|---|---|
| Greenhouse gas emissions (base year 1990) | −27.0% | −40% | −55% | −70% | −80 to −95% |
The 2030 value is also the 2016 Paris Agreement nationally determined contribution (NDC) for Germany.

Regarding European Union policy, in October 2009 the Council of the European Union agreed that the appropriate abatement objective for Europe and other developed economies was 80–95% below 1990 levels by 2050 (consistent with Germany). In October 2014 the European Council endorsed a binding European Union target of an at least 40% reduction in domestic greenhouse gas emissions by 2030 relative to 1990 (less stringent than Germany).

== Climate Action Programme 2020 ==
The Climate Action Programme 2020 (Aktionsprogramm Klimaschutz 2020) is an attempt by Germany to help meet its official 2020 greenhouse gas emissions reductions target after a 'climate gap' had been identified. (Note: Official translations use the British spelling of programme.) Projections from 2013 show Germany may miss its 40% reductions target by about 7%-points without additional measures. The first draft of the programme was released in mid-November 2014. How best to control the contribution from coal-fired generation remained controversial, but economy and energy minister Sigmar Gabriel (SPD) dismissed plans aired in his ministry in October 2014 to retire 10 GW of coal capacity.

The Climate Action Programme 2020 was approved on 3 December 2014. The official document is available in English.

The most significant part of the new package is a pledge to cut electricity sector emissions substantially by 2020. To do so, the government proposes to cap emissions from the sector at 22 million tonnes between 2016 and 2020 or 4.4 million tonnes each year. Once the cap is in place, energy companies will be allocated allowances based on their current emissions. If they cut their emissions by a greater amount, they may be able to sell their surplus to other companies. The package also contains measures to improve energy efficiency and the transport sector. Environmental groups criticized the package for not going far enough in reducing the reliance on coal-fired generation.

In December 2015, the government remained confident that its 2020 emissions target will be met through the measures contained in the programme and elsewhere. However, a government report, released on 30 September 2016, shows that Germany will meet its 2020 greenhouse gas commitments only under "a best case scenario". The report, prepared for the European Union, is available in German. The analysis projects Germany's greenhouse gas emissions forward for the next 20 years.

A PwC report from November 2016 evaluates the economic and ecological effects of the Climate Action Programme 2020 and finds that the economic benefits outweigh the costs of the proposed measures. Based on the report, environment minister Barbara Hendricks said in a press release that "the programme will create 430000 additional jobs and a GDP increase of 1% by 2020".

In early 2017, the government agreed to scrap the 2020 plan entirely.

== Development of the Climate Action Plan 2050 ==
The history of the Climate Action Plan 2050 is quite involved. The Federal Ministry for the Environment, Nature Conservation, Building and Nuclear Safety (BMUB) is the lead agency for the plan, under the direction of environment minister Barbara Hendricks (SPD). A novel public consultation process was utilized to collect ideas from state and city governments, advocacy groups, and citizens and these ideas were then used to help create the first version. Internal drafts of the plan were leaked three times to the media in 2016, the first in early May, the second in late June, and the third in early November.

=== Coalition agreement: 2013 ===
The notion of a climate action plan arose from the coalition agreement between the CDU, CSU, and SPD parties in 2013. The agreement stated:

[I]n Germany we want to define an emissions reduction pathway with a final target of 80 to 95 percent lower greenhouse gas emissions compared to 1990 by 2050. We will augment this target with concrete measures, drawn up through a broad dialogue (Climate Action Plan).

=== Public consultation: 25 June 2015 – 19 March 2016 ===
A public consultation with stakeholders began on 25–26 June 2015 with a Kick-off Conference in Berlin. A discussion paper for this exercise was dated 9 June 2015 and is available in English. The consultation process involved a series of meetings with states (Länder), municipalities, associations, and citizens, with delegates selected to represent these various groupings in subsequent forums. The process was organized by the Wuppertal Institute and the dialog agency IFOK. The resulting proposals for action were collated and presented at a meeting at the environment ministry (BMUB) on 18–19 March 2016. The final report is available in German. This input was used to help create the first draft of the Climate Action Plan 2050. The German government also explained its public participation process at the 2015 United Nations Climate Change Conference (COP 21) on 9 December 2015. The design of the consultation process was novel for Germany. An explanatory video from the BMUB is available.

=== First leaked draft: early May 2016 ===
A draft of the plan was leaked to media for the first time in early May 2016. It was the result of consolidating a long catalog of measures from the consultation process. The leaked plan included proposals for:

- ecological tax reform and the internalization of environmental costs
- climate friendly investment
- reducing emissions from coal and a phase-out of coal (Kohleausstieg) well before 2050
- making both old and new buildings climate-neutral
- the digitalisation and electrification of the transport sector
- a floor price for carbon and climate-aware investment
- a reduction in the numbers of ruminant animals and for the public to eat less meat
- the use forests as carbon sinks and the renaturalisation of moorlands for the same purpose
- the investigation of a new national welfare index
- the embedding of climate protection in local and regional public services

The plan also suggested a "pluralistic" (meaning diverse groups are represented) commission be established, tasked with developing a coal phase-out plan by mid-2017.

Following the leaked document, state governments became increasingly concerned that they were being railroaded into climate change goals that could damage their regional economies.

=== Second leaked draft: 21 June 2016 ===
A draft of the plan was leaked to media for the second time in late June 2016. The draft was dated 21 June 2016 and is available for download in German. Unlike the first leak, this draft was compiled after consultation with the economics and energy ministry (BMWi).

The new draft shows that individual sectors may escape specific emissions targets and that an end date for coal-fired generation has been omitted. Earlier versions had contained sector-specific targets for energy, transport, industry, buildings, and agriculture. The energy sector which was previously slated to make a "considerable" contribution is now required to make an "adequate" contribution. Rather than saying that coal-fired generation must "end well before 2050" the new draft emphasizes that "the importance of power production from coal will decrease" and that there will be a "step-by-step reduction". The previous draft stated that the transport sector would need to deliver "disproportionately high" emissions reductions (on account of the poor performance of the sector to date), that has now diminished to an "ambitious" contribution. Other proposals remain, including the development of ecological tax reform. The plan also includes targets for modernizing the heating and cooling systems in buildings, including no new fossil-fueled heating systems in houses after 2030.

The proposal for a Commission on Climate Protection, Growth, Structural Change, and the Completion of the Energiewende (Kommission "Klimaschutz, Wachstum, Strukturwandel und Vollendung der Energiewende") remains, but now without the specific task of developing a roadmap for the phase-out of coal.

The weakening of the plan is also a result of industry associations repeatedly criticizing sector targets and itemized measures, which they fear would harm Germany's economic performance and international competitiveness.

=== Official draft: 6 September 2016 ===
An official draft was released on 6 September 2016 and is available in German. This draft retains a provision for the establishment of a Commission on Climate Protection, Growth, Structural Change, and the Completion of the Energiewende.

The content however has been watered down considerably. Concrete emissions reductions targets were removed altogether. The previously leaked June 2016 draft stated that by 2030 "a large majority of newly registered cars" would need to be powered by either electricity or biofuels. However, the new draft merely states that "the government aims to significantly lower car emissions by 2030" and that electric cars can contribute to that goal.

Environmental groups have become increasingly critical of the plan as each iteration led to a watering down of its climate protection provisions. The NGOs were particularly concerned about the lack of detail concerning a coal phase-out. On 24 September 2016, Greenpeace Germany issued a report critical of the watering down of the results of the consultation process.

=== Cabinet deliberations: late 2016 ===
In late 2016, the plan went to the Chancellery (Bundeskanzleramt) to coordinate the final version to be agreed by the German cabinet (Bundeskabinett).

Media reports in late October 2016 suggest a deepening rift between the economics and energy ministry (BMWi) and the environment ministry (BMUB) over the plan and the exit process for coal-fired generation (Kohleausstieg). Economy and energy minister Sigmar Gabriel opposes the setting of a coal exit date before job alternatives for lignite workers have been determined.

A revised draft plan, circulated by the environment ministry on 4 November 2016, was obtained by Süddeutsche Zeitung. The plan has become more stringent and now includes passages that had earlier been removed during the negotiations between ministries. The new plan also precludes new coal-fired generation and the expansion of existing open-pit mines and calls on the government to lobby for an EU-wide floor price for auctioned EU ETS emissions allowances.

On 7 November 2016, over 40 German companies, including energy suppliers EnBW and MVV Energie and network operator 50Hertz, together with Commerzbank, Deutsche Telekom, IKEA, and Hochtief, are lobbying for a more ambitious program, one which ensures that Germany's Paris Agreement commitments are met. The companies want sector-specific emissions targets for 2030 and state that "only in this way can new business models and concrete plans for decarbonisation be developed". They want the goal to be the "rapid switch to 100% renewable energy". British economist Nicholas Stern also backs a more ambitious plan. The original statement from the companies is available.

On 8 November 2016, economy and energy minister Gabriel vetoed the plan amid concerns by trade union IG BCE and supported by the BDI industry group. The draft does not timetable a phase-out for brown coal, notwithstanding Gabriel said he expected brown coal to remain in use past 2040. On 11 November 2016, Reuters news agency reported that chancellor Angela Merkel and ministers Gabriel and Hendricks had agreed on a new draft.

=== Approval: 14 November 2016 ===
On 14 November 2016, the cabinet officially adopted and released the new plan. It was overseen by a CDU/CSU/SPD grand coalition government, led by Angela Merkel. The timing allowed environment minister Barbara Hendricks to present the German plan at the COP 22 climate talks held in Marrakesh, Morocco. Canada, Mexico, and the US also presented climate action plans.

== Climate Action Plan 2050 ==
The official Climate Action Plan 2050 is available in German and runs to 91 pages. An official summary of the principles and goals underpinning the plan is available in English.

The plan is to be supplemented by a program of policy measures, developed by the German parliament (Bundestag), with the first such program to be in place in 2018. Annual reporting will track progress and should facilitate specific policy adjustments where needed.

=== Preamble ===
The plan begins with a preamble that states that the document is an evolving work in progress and "cannot and does not want to be a detailed masterplan". It adds that there will be "no rigid provisions" and that the plan is technology neutral and open to innovation. The preamble stresses that the government will simultaneously maintain German competitiveness:

We want to advance the upcoming changes without structural ruptures. It's about using the strength and creativity of the German market economy, as well as the forces of competition to reach existing national, European and international climate protection targets.

The preamble also reiterates Germany's 2010 climate targets (see table) and its 2016 Paris Agreement commitment. (Note: Germany's 2015 intended nationally determined contribution (INDC) became its nationally determined contribution (NDC) when it ratified the Paris Agreement on 5 October 2016.)

=== Sector targets ===
Sector targets remained controversial during the development of the plan. Notwithstanding, the official document now specifies sector targets for the first time under a national climate protection policy. The initial sector targets will be subject to a comprehensive impact assessment and consultation and may well be adjusted as a result in 2018.

Sector targets for greenhouse gas emission reductions for 2030
| Sector | 1990 | 2014 | 2030 | Reduction (2030 relative 1990) |
|---|---|---|---|---|
| Energy | 466 | 358 | 175–183 | 61–62% |
| Buildings | 209 | 119 | 70–72 | 66–67% |
| Transport | 163 | 160 | 95–98 | 40–42% |
| Industry | 283 | 181 | 140–143 | 49–51% |
| Agriculture | 88 | 72 | 58–61 | 31–34% |
| Other | 39 | 12 | 5 | 87% |
| Total | 1248 | 902 | 543–562 | 55–56% |
Units: million tonnes CO_{2}eq.; 1990 and 2014 values are actual.

For comparison, the Paris Agreement nationally determined contribution (NDC) for Germany is −55% relative to 1990 (which accords with the final cell in the table).

=== Commission for growth, structural change, and regional development ===
The plan establishes a commission for growth, structural change, and regional development. Unlike earlier versions, the commission will not be tasked with setting a date for an exit from coal. Instead, the commission will "support the structural changes" resulting from transformation and will "develop a mix of instruments that will bring together economic development, structural change, social acceptability and climate protection". The commission will be based at the economics and energy ministry, but will consult with other ministries, federal states, municipalities, and unions, as well as with representatives of "affected" companies and regions. The commission is scheduled to start work at the beginning of 2018 and to report at the end of 2018.

=== EU Emissions Trading System ===
The plan stresses to role of the European Union Emission Trading System (EU ETS) as the primary climate protection instrument covering the energy sector and parts of industry in central Europe. The government wants to strengthen price signaling and will campaign to make the EU ETS "effective" at a European level. Earlier provisions to set a floor price for emissions allowances were removed.

=== Energy sector ===
The energy sector GHG target for 2030 is 175–183 million tonnes CO_{2}eq or a reduction of 61–62% relative to 1990. The energy supply must be "almost completely decarbonised" by 2050, with renewables as its main source. For the electricity sector, "in the long-term, electricity generation must be based almost entirely on renewable energies" and "the share of wind and solar power in total electricity production will rise significantly".

If "possible and economically sensible", renewable energy will be used directly in all sectors, and electricity from renewable sources will be used efficiently for heating, transport, and industry. The utilization of biomass will be limited and sourced mostly from waste. The plan states that transitioning to a power supply based on renewables while ensuring supply security is "technically feasible". During the transition, "less carbon-intensive natural gas power plants and the existing most modern coal power plants play an important role as interim technologies".

The plan states that "the climate targets can only be reached if coal-fired power generation is reduced step-by-step". Moreover, the German government "in its development cooperation does not lend support to new coal power plants". Regions which depend on coal, like the Lausitz, need special consideration: "we must succeed in establishing concrete perspectives for the future of the affected regions, before concrete decisions on the step-by-step withdrawal from the lignite industry can be taken".

Notwithstanding, a coal phase-out for Germany is implied in the plan, environment minister Barbara Hendricks said in an interview on 21 November 2016. "If you read the Climate Action Plan carefully, you will find that the exit from coal-fired power generation is the immanent consequence of the energy sector target. ... By 2030 ... half of the coal-fired power production must have ended, compared to 2014", Hendricks said.

The plan also establishes a regional fund to foster new businesses in lignite mining regions. The government will need to ensure that EU competition law does not inhibit the operation of the fund.

=== Building sector ===
The building sector GHG target for 2030 is 70–72 million tonnes CO_{2}eq or a reduction of 66–67% relative to 1990. Under the plan, Germany's building stock will be largely carbon-neutral by 2050 and their limited energy needs will be met through renewables. Due to the slow turnover of buildings, the groundwork for this goal must be laid by 2030. The government will invest heavily in programs to implement high energy standards for buildings. Heating, cooling, and electricity supply will be progressively switched to renewables. The government will terminate support programs that rely on fossil fuels by 2020 and switch instead to support programs using renewable systems. The aim is to "make renewables-based systems much more attractive than fossil-fuel-based ones".

=== Transport sector ===
The transport sector GHG target for 2030 is 95–98 million tonnes CO_{2}eq or a reduction of 40–42% relative to 1990. Unlike earlier drafts, the plan does not now set a deadline for all new cars to be emissions free. Rather the plan states that stricter emissions limits for new cars will be set by the European Union and that "the government will advocate [an] ambitious development of the targets" so that its 2030-goal can be met. These cuts will derive from improved efficiencies and increasingly GHG-neutral energy. Such cuts will require "a significant contribution by the electrification of new cars and should have priority". The plan emphasizes the contribution that biofuels can make, stating that "in the target scenario, the energy supply of street and rail traffic, as well as parts of air and maritime traffic and inland shipping is switched to biofuels – if ecologically compatible – and otherwise largely to renewable electricity as well as other GHG-neutral fuels". The need to support public transport, rail transport, and cycling is stressed in the plan. The plan states a next step is to determine the framework needed to ensure that new powertrain technologies and energy forms will be adopted at scale. This then "involves the question of when, at the latest, they should be introduced into the market, and what penetration rate they should achieve by what date".

=== Industry ===
The industry GHG target for 2030 is 140–143 million tonnes CO_{2}eq or a reduction of 49–51% relative to 1990. Good progress has been made and, as of 2016, the sector must reduce its emissions by about another 20%. Notwithstanding, the plan emphasizes the need to maintain international competitiveness:

With our modernizing strategy for the economy, the correct political framework, and active regional and structural policy that supports structural change, we want to create dependable framework conditions for the German economy, to adjust to this transformational process early, and use the possibilities connected to it.

The plan continues that, despite the costs and challenges, climate protection could become an "innovation motor" for a modern high-tech economy. The plan acknowledges that some industrial emissions cannot be avoided – for instance, those from steel production or chemical plants. Such emissions should be reduced as far as possible by developing new processes and replacing old ones – or through the use of carbon capture and utilization (CCU) or carbon capture and storage (CCS). The government will launch a research and development program to advance these and other low-carbon processes.

=== Agricultural sector ===
The agricultural sector GHG target for 2030 is 58–61 million tonnes CO_{2}eq or a reduction of 31–34% relative to 1990. The plan acknowledges that agriculture cannot reach zero emissions, due to the biological processes inherent in plant cultivation and livestock farming. Instead the plan will focus on reducing emissions as much as possible and on the more efficient use of resources. About one third of agricultural emissions are due to nitrous oxide from fertilizer use. The government wants to reduce these emissions through better management and through research and development. Another one third of emissions derive from ruminant animals. The government will develop a comprehensive strategy to reduce emissions from livestock farming by 2021. The plan states that 20% of agricultural land by 2030 "should be used for organic farming", compared with 6.3% in 2014. The government also advocates the use of financial instruments under a reformed EU Common Agricultural Policy to reduce GHG emissions from the sector."

=== Land use and forestry sector ===
The land use and forestry sector offers opportunities for carbon sequestration. The government will prioritize improving the performance of forests as carbon sinks. Sustainable forest management will also be promoted and permanent grasslands and marshes are to be preserved. The expansion of settlements and transport infrastructure is to be reduced to 30 ha per day by 2020 and to zero by 2050.

=== Financial matters ===
Under the plan, the government will consider how to incrementally revise taxation through to 2050, on the understanding that "environmental taxes and levies can create incentives for ecological economic activity" and that "environmentally related taxes and levies can cost-efficiently trigger climate-friendly economic behavior". The government also intends to reduce environmentally harmful subsidies. In addition, the government will support efforts to reconcile global finance flows with climate protection goals, for instance through its role on the G20 Financial Stability Board.

=== Implementation and revision of the plan ===
The plan is predicated on a gradual transformation, achieved through a learning process involving the scientific community and accompanied by public dialogue. It is therefore intended that the plan can and should respond to changing technological, political, and social conditions. The plan will be reviewed every five years to align it with the evolution of Germany's nationally determined contribution (NDC) under the Paris Agreement. The first update is therefore slated for late 2019 or early 2020. As early as 2018, the government intends to strengthen the plan by quantifying the various emission reduction efforts and their associated ecological, social, and economic impacts. The sector targets may be modified as a result. Annual reporting should help the government to evaluate and adjust its specific climate protection measures in the short-term.

== Reactions ==
Thilo Schaefer, climate and energy expert at the Cologne Institute for Economic Research (IW), comments that "it looks like the government forgot that the energy sector and industry already participate in the European emissions trading system ... in the end, it will simply become more expensive for the affected sectors, but they won't save a single extra ton of CO_{2} ... because the emissions saved by German sectors can be emitted by other states".

Simone Peter, co-chair of the Green Party, said "this is not a good plan anymore, it has become an empty shell, because the ministerial colleagues of [environment minister] Hendricks have removed anything that could be of relevance – be it the coal exit, the end of the combustion engine, or a transition in agriculture".

Klaus Töpfer, founding director of the Institute for Advanced Sustainability Studies (IASS), said "this plan is certainly not yet capable of securing the German contribution to the Paris Climate Agreement. This will require more work".

Regine Günther, director of policy and climate at WWF Germany, said "today's climate action plan is only a fraction of what is needed. The only plus point: all sectors get precise reduction targets, which WWF welcomes. However, the list of negatives is much longer: there are no appropriate measures to reach those targets. There is also a blank on the issue of coal. The plan completely dropped the urgently needed ban on further extension of open cast mining. The commission on coal will not start until 2018, after the federal elections. A minimum price on carbon is also missing completely. With this plan, the industry and energy lobbies have proven how well placed they are in the economy ministry. With such a plan there can be no ambitious climate protection."

Ottmar Edenhofer, a German climate economist and director of the MCC, criticized the plan. He said economy and energy minister "Sigmar Gabriel yielded to lobbyists and sadly put short-term interests before long-term interests".

== See also ==
- Barbara Hendricks (SPD) – the environment minister during the development of the plan
- Climate change mitigation – actions to limit climate change
- Energiewende in Germany – the German energy system transition
- German Federal Ministry for Economic Affairs and Energy (BMWi)
- German Federal Ministry for the Environment, Nature Conservation, Building and Nuclear Safety (BMUB)
