= List of photovoltaic power stations =

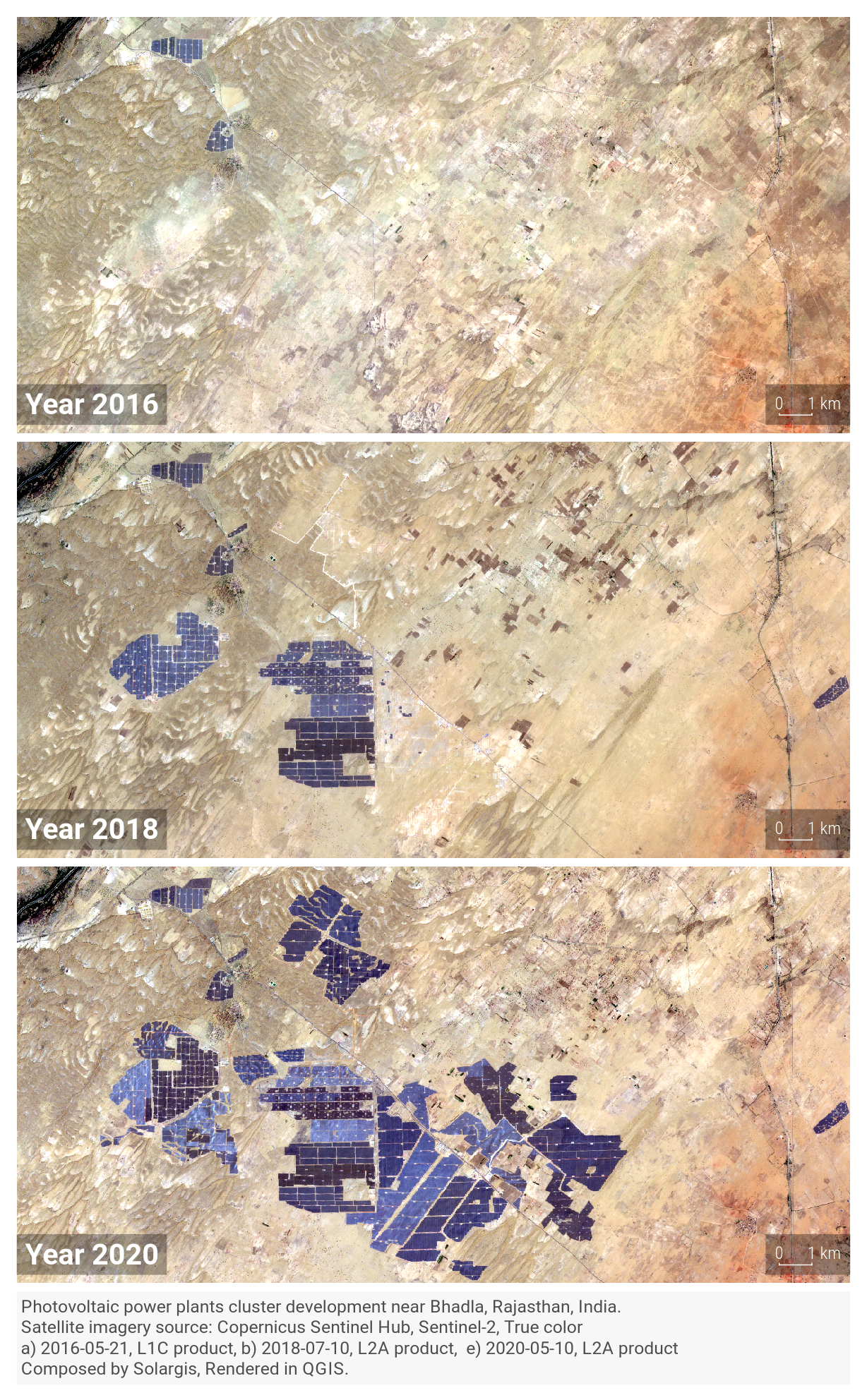
2016–2020 development of Bhadla Solar Park (India) documented by satellite imagery

The following is a list of photovoltaic power stations that are larger than 500 megawatts (MW) in current net capacity. Most are individual photovoltaic power stations, but some are groups of co-located plants owned by different independent power producers and with separate transformer connections to the grid. Wiki-Solar reports total global capacity of utility-scale photovoltaic plants to be some 96 GW_{AC} which generated 1.3% of global power by the end of 2016.

The size of photovoltaic power stations has increased progressively over the last decade with frequent new capacity records. The 97 MW Sarnia Photovoltaic Power Plant went online in 2010. Huanghe Hydropower Golmud Solar Park reached 200 MW in 2012. In August 2012, Agua Caliente Solar Project in Arizona reached 247 MW only to be passed by three larger plants in 2013. In 2014, two plants were tied as largest: Topaz Solar Farm, a PV solar plant at 550 MW_{AC} in central coast area and a second 550-MW plant, the Desert Sunlight Solar Farm located in the far eastern desert region of California. These two plants were superseded by a new world's largest facility in June 2015 when the 579 MW_{AC} Solar Star project went online in the Antelope Valley region of Los Angeles County, California.

Talatan Solar Park (in Gonghe County, Qinghai, China) is the largest solar park in the world, with a capacity of 16,000MW as of 2023 and a planning area of 609 km^{2}, which is close to the land area of Singapore.

As with other forms of power generation, there are important regional habitat modification problems, such as the heat island effect, and the resulting stress to local threatened species. Several planned large facilities in the U.S. state of California have been downsized due in part to such concerns.

== World's largest photovoltaic power stations ==
Photovoltaic power station locations

The following is a list of operating solar farms that are 500 MW or larger.

These lists include a mixture of individual solar power plants and of groups of co-located projects, usually called solar parks.

Name	Country	Location	Capacity MW_{DC} or MW_{AC} (*)	Annual output (GWh)	Land size (km^{2})	Year	Remarks	Ref
Talatan Solar Park	China	36°10′54″N 100°34′41″E	21,000	18,000	420	ongoing since 2011	Multiple phases built over time since 2011, rather than a single project. Which includes a site testing 100MW of various solar panel designs. Launched 3GW on 2025	
Ningdong Solar Park	China	37.97316°N 106.87157°E	18,320				In 2025, 3.5GW PV launched. Included 2GW+4GW Compound PV Projects on Coal Mining Subsidence Land, which is fulled launched on 2026	
Hobq Solar Park	China	40.3967°N 108.88052°E 40.30244°N 109.72149°E	10,020		466	2024	Located in Kubuqi Desert In Hanggin Banner and Dalad Banner. 2GW in each site. 13.5GW in Dalad Banner's plan.	
Urtmorin Solar Park	China	36.8135°N 93.4281°E	5,440			since 2021	18 sub-project, total 5640MW(200MW CSP) on 2025 May,	
Midong Solar Park	China	44.725°N 87.679°E	5,000	6,090	133	since 2024	Include a 3.5GW largest single PV station, and a 0.5GW station. 9.35GW is under construction. 25.75GW planned.	
Ruoqiang Solar Park	China	38.9050°N 88.2522°E	4,000	7,200	88.27	2024		
Otog Front Banner Solar Park	China	38.43564°N 106.88427°E	4,000	5,700	90	2024	3 GW 70 km^{2} owned by China Energy Group; 1 GW owned by Inner Mongolia Energy Group	
Lingwu solar project	China		4,000	>7,000		2026		
Gelmud East Solar Park	China	36.37106°N 95.19344°E	3,534		149.6	2024		
Delingha Solar Park	China	33°22′21″N 97°12′39″E	3,350	6,000	70	2024	First farms commissioned in 2018, expected to be expanded to 2 GW	
Nilka County PV Park	China	43.91704°N 82.37686°E	3,000		48	2024	Phase I 2000MW, Phase II 1000MW, Phase III 275.2MW(building)	
Mengxi Lanhai Solar Plant	China		3,000		70	2024	In Ordos, Inner Mongolia. Part of "Otog Front Banner Solar Park", This is a 4GW PV project for Shanghaimiao - Shandong UHVDC.	
Mori Solar Park	China	44°01′57″N 90°20′41″E	>3,000		92	2021	In Mori Kazakh, Xinjiang Planned 31.98GW	
Bhadla Solar Park	India	27°32′22.81″N 71°54′54.91″E	2,245		56	2018	First farms commissioned in 2018, more farms are gradually added, expected to be expanded to 3.5 GW	
Pavagada Solar Park	India	14°16′09″N 77°24′50″E	2,050		53	2019	In Karnataka state	
Mohammed bin Rashid Al Maktoum Solar Park	United Arab Emirates	24°45′N 55°23′E	4,660	2,800	77	2022	Phase I completed in 2013, followed by Phase II and III. Phase IV (including 250 MW PV) is under construction, as well as Phase V (first stage is completed).	
Al Dhafra Solar project	United Arab Emirates	24°7′58.61″N 54°33′6.99″E	2,000		21	2023	Largest single-site project	
Alax Tengger Desert Solar Park	China	38.73067°N 105.23474°E	2,000		43	2024	In Alxa, Inner Mongolia. 8GW on planning	
Wulanbuhe Desert Solar Park	China	40.21489°N 106.86848°E	2,000		43	2024	In Inner Mongolia. 8GW on planning	
China Energy Lingshao Solar Park	China	37.67907°N 106.77509°E	2,000		43	2024		
Benban Solar Park	Egypt	24°27′21.6″N 32°44′20.4″E	1,650	3,800	37	2019	In Aswan	
Complexo Solar Janaúba	Brazil	15.8152°S 43.3678°W	1,617	3,000	50	2025	Located in Minas Gerais, it is the largest solar park in South America.	
Mammoth Solar	United States	40°59′45″N 86°49′19″W	1,600			2026	1,300 MWac. Built in four phases	
Tengger Desert Solar Park	China	37°33′00″N 105°03′14″E	1,547		43	2016	In Zhongwei, Ningxia	
Sudair Solar PV Project	Saudi Arabia	25°47.212′N 45°33.8522′E	1,500			2023		
NP Kunta	India	14°01′N 78°26′E	1,500			2021	Also called Ananthapuram - I Ultra Mega Solar Park. In Nambulapulakunta Mandal of Andhra Pradesh state. Total planned capacity 1500 MW	
MTerra Solar	Philippines		1,373			2026	Planned for 3.5 GW and 4.5 GWh storage	
Kalyon Karapınar Solar Power Plant	Turkey	37°47′26″N 33°35′4.92″E	1,350	1,700	20	2021	1350 MW fully operational	
Korla	China	41.71886°N 85.38248°E	1,300	2,100	23.3	2025	Planned 240 sqkm, 100GW	
Noor Abu Dhabi	United Arab Emirates	24°24′11″N 55°16′07″E	1,177		8	2019	At Sweihan	
Jinchuan Solar Park	China	38°36′35″N 102°08′22″E	1,030		90	2019	In Jinchuan, Gansu	
Fatehgarh Solar Park	India		1,000			2023	In Rajasthan	
Kurnool Ultra Mega Solar Park	India	15.681522°N 78.283749°E	1,000		24	2017		
Datong Solar Power Top Runner Base	China	40°04′25″N 113°08′12″E, 40°00′19″N 112°57′20″E	1,000			2016	Total capacity will be 3 GW in 3 phases.	
Yanchi Solar Park	China	38.1633714°N 106.7611986°E	1,000			2016	Last extension in 2019, up to 2,000 MW when complete.	
Dongying offshore solar project	China	37.521°N 118.971°E	1,000			2025	World's largest offshore solar plant	
Gemini Solar Project	United States	36.462841°N 114.762031°W	966			2024	690 MW_{AC}, with 380 MW of batteries, in Nevada	
Orion Solar Belt	United States	30.941901°N 97.119118°W	875			2024	Three phases in Texas	
Edwards Sanborn Solar and Energy Storage Project	United States	34.958833°N 118.109138°W	864			2023	Includes 3,320 MWh battery storage	
São Gonçalo Solar Farm	Brazil	10.1102°S 45.2794°W	864			2020	Phase II completed in February 2021, Phase III completed in January 2023	
Escatrón-Chiprana-Samper Solar Farm	Spain	41°13′50″N 0°15′38″W	850		31.7	2020	Complex of 17 projects	
Futura I Solar Complex	Brazil	9.655633°S 40.679367°W	837	1,600	16.49	2023	It has a total capacity of 837 MWp, powering around 1.7 million people annually.	
Xuan Thien - Ea Sup 1	Vietnam		831			2020	600MWac, four more units in planning	
Villanueva Solar Park	Mexico	25°35′5″N 103°2′42″W	828	1,700	27.5	2018		
Lumina I and II Solar Project	United States	32.923898°N 100.974875°W	828			2024	640 MWac	
Copper Mountain Solar Facility	United States	35°47′N 114°59′W	802*	1,348	16.2	2016	In Nevada. Fifth unit of 250MW added March 2021.	
Al Kharsaah solar power plant	Qatar	25.2389°N 51.0148°E	800			2022		
Mount Signal Solar	United States	32°40′24″N 115°38′23″W	794	1,197	15.9	2020	Phase 1 of 206 MW_{AC} in May 2014. Phase 3 of 254 MW_{AC} in July 2018. Phase 2 of 154 MW_{AC} completed in January 2020. Total 614 MW_{AC}	
Sol do Cerrado Solar Park	Brazil	15.7450°S 43.2280°W	766	1,600	12.80	2023	17 sub-parks with over 1.4 million bifacial solar panels, generating approximately 1,600 GWh annually and offsetting 134,000 tonnes of CO₂ emissions per year.	
Eland Solar plus Storage Project	United States		758			2025	With 300 MW storage	
Rewa Ultra Mega Solar	India	24°28′49″N 81°34′28″E	750		6.4	2018		
Solar Star (I and II)	United States	34°49′50″N 118°23′53″W	747	1,664	13	2015	579 MW_{AC}, 747.3 MW_{DC}.	
Charanka Solar Park	India	23°54′N 71°12′E	790		20	2012	At Charanka village in Patan district of Gujarat. Capacity expected to go up to 790 MW in 2019.	
Danish Fields	United States	29.025655°N 96.242629°W	720			2024	Texas. 225 MWh battery	
Prospero Solar I and II	United States	32.294502°N 102.857183°W	710			2021	550 MW_{AC}	
Westlands Solar Park	United States	36.196027°N 119.896606°W	672*			2023	Solar park, up to 2000 MW_{AC} when completed	
Hélio Valgas Solar Complex	Brazil	17.5356°S 44.7767°W	662	1,300	14.98	2023	10 units with a total capacity of 662 MWp, producing over 1,300 GWh of clean energy annually.	
Anhui Fuyang Southern Wind-solar-storage	China		650			2023	Floating solar, co-located with 550 MW wind, 300 MW storage	
Kamuthi Solar Power Project	India	9°21′16″N 78°23′4″E	648	1,350	10.1	2017		
Roseland Solar	United States	31.463654°N 96.826703°W	640			2023	500 MWac	
Frye Solar Power Plant	United States	34.396667°N 101.596031°W	637			2024	500 MWac	
Aktina Solar Power Plant	United States	29.074732°N 96.278276°W	631			2024	500 MWac	
Trung Nam Thuan Nam	Vietnam		630			2020	450 MWac	
Spotsylvania Solar	United States	38.2471°N 77.7862°W	618		14	2021	4 phases completed in 2020 and 2021	
Solarpark Witznitz	Germany	51°09′26″N 12°25′08″E	605			2024	Largest single plant in Europe	
Taygete Solar	United States		602			2023	459 MWac, built in two phases - Taygete I of 255 MWac and Taygete II of 204 MWac	
Bikaner Solar Farm	India		600			2022		
Dau Tieng Solar Power Project	Vietnam	11.463827°N 106.216709°E	600			2019	Phases 1 and 2 June 2019; phase 3 completed September 2019	
Lawan-Purohitsar Solar Farm	India	26°53′40″N 72°03′31″E	600			2021		
Radhnesada Solar Park	India		600			2023	In Gujarat	
Hornet Solar	United States		600			2025	Texas	
Double Black Diamond	United States	39.539001°N 89.885479°W	593			2025	Illinois	
Francisco Pizarro Solar Farm	Spain	39.5678°N 5.6859°W	590			2022		
Manah II	Oman		588			2024		
Fox Squirrel Solar	United States	39.784695°N 83.342920°W	577			2024	Ohio, three phases	
Hongshagang Solar Park	China		574			?	Multi-phase project, expected to be expanded to 920 MW	
Obelisk solar project	Egypt		561			2026	Multi-phase project, expected to be expanded to 1125 MW	
Desert Sunlight Solar Farm	United States	33°49′33″N 115°24′08″W	550*	1,287	16	2015	Phase I of 300 MW_{AC} completed 2013. Phase II to final capacity completed January 2015.	
Topaz Solar Farm	United States	35°23′N 120°4′W	550*	1,268	19	2014	Gradually commissioned since February 2013. Reached final capacity November 2014.	
Wenzhou Taihan Solar Farm	China		550	650	5	2021	Floating solar farm over fish farm	
Kenhardt Solar Power Complex Station	South Africa	29°19′09″S 21°09′33″E	540			2023		
Mendubim Solar Plant	Brazil	16.16234°S 40.79922°W	531	1,200	12.00	2024	531 MWp solar power generating approximately 1.2 TWh annually, enough to power 620,000 households.	
Mesquite Solar project	United States	33°20′N 112°55′W	513*	1,133		2016	In Arizona. Up to 700 MW_{AC} when complete. Fifth phase completed in January 2024	
Núñez de Balboa photovoltaic plant	Spain	38°26′45″N 6°13′16″W	500		10	2020		
Yinchuan Xingqing Solar Farm	China		500			2018		
Ibri II Solar Park	Oman		500*			2022		
Wulanmulun Solar Park	China		500	900	28	2021		
Bellefield	United States	35°02′N 118°05′W	500	3,200	33.5	2025	Two phase solar+storage, each consisting of 500MW solar and 500MW 4hr battery storage.	
Oberon Solar Project	United States	33.722537°N 115.362939°W	500			2023	California, with 250 MW battery storage	

Note: Power capacity in this table is given as the peak DC nameplate capacity of the panels. When this information is not available, the AC capacity after the inverter is given (identified with "*" next to the number). The AC capacity is usually significantly smaller than DC capacity, so the ranking may not be accurate for these plants. See Nominal power (photovoltaic)#Conversion from DC to AC for more information.

Talatan Solar Park, China is the world's largest solar power plant.

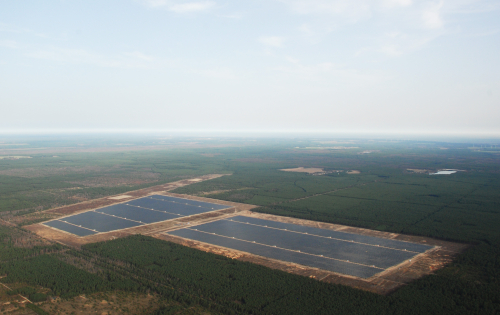
Lieberose Photovoltaic Park

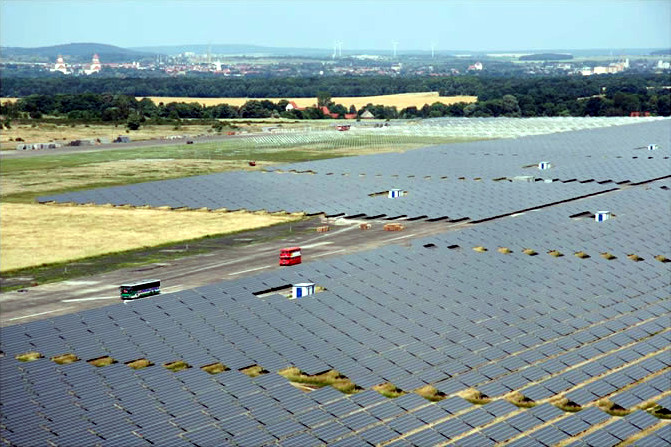
Waldpolenz Solar Park

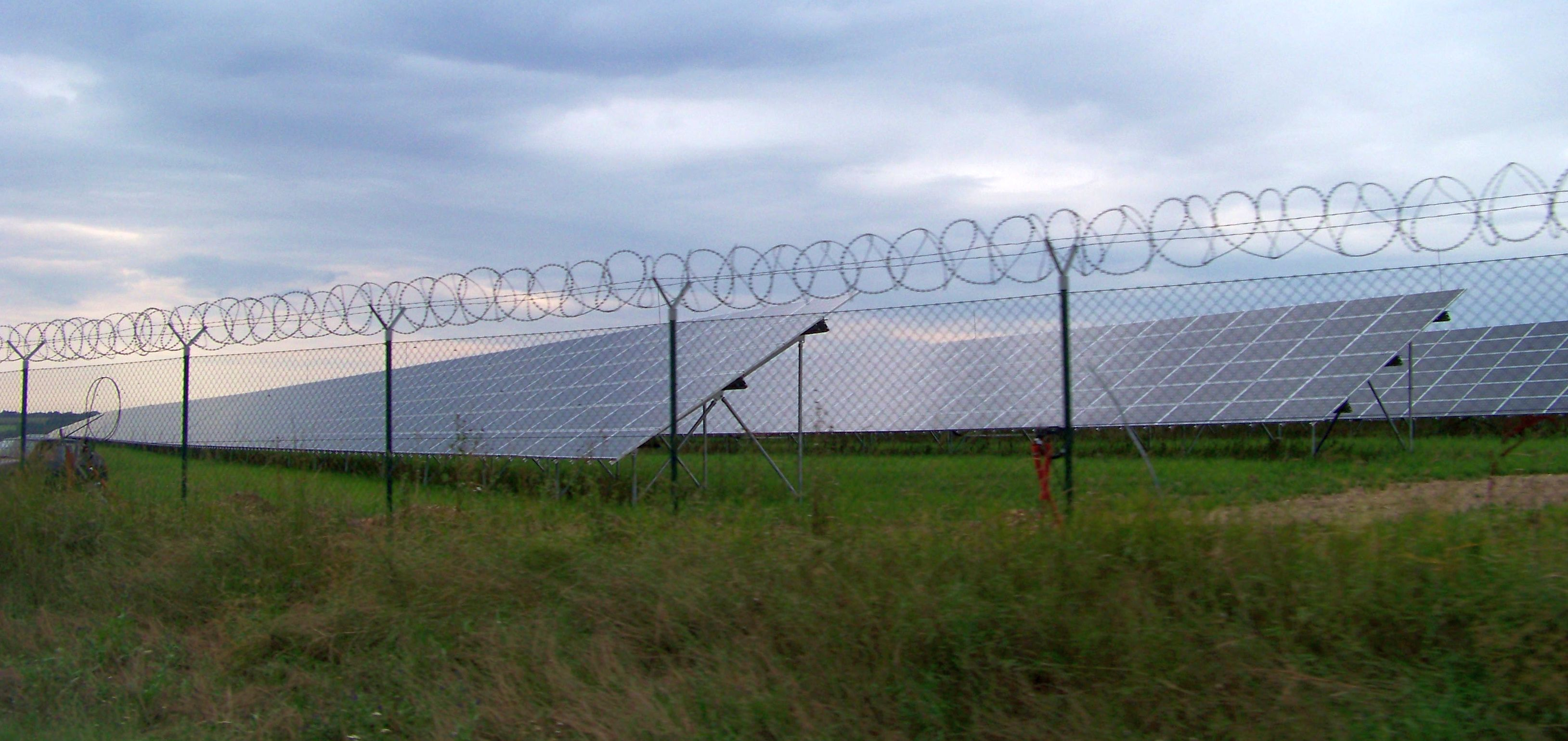
Vepřek Solar Park

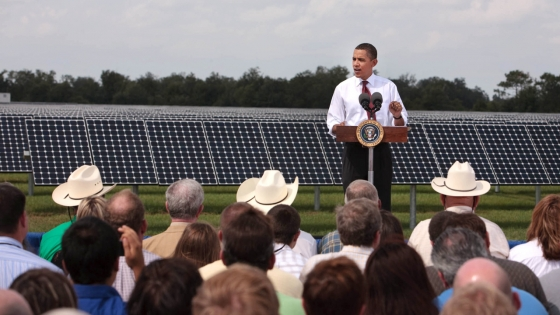
United States President Barack Obama at the DeSoto Next Generation Solar Energy Center

== Timeline of the largest PV power stations ==
Timeline of the largest PV power stations in the world
Year^{(a)}	Name of PV power station	Country	Capacity MW
1982	Lugo	United States	1
1985	Carrisa Plain	United States	5.6
2005	Bavaria Solarpark (Mühlhausen)	Germany	6.3
2006	Erlasee Solar Park	Germany	11.4
2008	Olmedilla Photovoltaic Park	Spain	60
2010	Sarnia Photovoltaic Power Plant	Canada	97
2011	Huanghe Hydropower Golmud Solar Park	China	200
2012	Agua Caliente Solar Project	United States	290
2014	Topaz Solar Farms^{(b)}	United States	550
2015	Talatan Solar Park	China	850
2016	Tengger Desert Solar Park	China	1547
2019	Pavagada Solar Park	India	2050
2020	Bhadla Solar Park	India	2245
2024	Midong Solar Park	China	3500
2025	Talatan Solar Park	China	8430
Also see list of photovoltaic power stations and list of notable solar parks (a) year of final commissioning (b) capacity given in MW_{AC} otherwise in MW_{DC}

== Largest PV power stations in each country ==
Largest PV power stations in each country
Country	Capacity MW	Name of PV power station	As of
Algeria	90	High Plateaus East, Adrar	
Argentina	300	Cauchari Solar Plant	2019
Australia	400	New England Solar and Western Downs Green Power Hub	2023
Austria	24.5	ECOwind Grafenworth Solar	2023
Azerbaijan	230	Garadagh Solar Power Plant	2023
Bangladesh	130	Bagerhat solar power plant	2021
Belarus	109	Cherikov Solar Power Plant	
Belgium	99.5	Kristal Solar Park	2019
Brazil	1,617	Complexo Solar Janaúba	
Bolivia	60	Uyuni Photovoltaic Plant	2018
Bulgaria	124	Verila	2023
Burkina Faso	33	Zagtouli Solar Power Station	2017
Burundi	7.5	Gigawatt Global Plant	2021
Canada	465	Travers Solar Project	2022
Czech Republic	38	Ralsko Solar Park	2010
Chile	480	CEME1	2024
China	8,430	Talatan Solar Park	2022
Colombia	487	Guayepo Solar Park	2024
Cyprus	8	Vassiliko Cement Works Photovoltaic Park	
Denmark	300	Kassø-Hjolderup	2022
Dominican Republic	120	Girasol Solar Park	2021
Egypt	1,500	Benban Solar Park	2019
France	300	Cestas Solar Park	2015
Germany	605	Solarpark Witznitz	2020
Ghana	22.25	Bui Solar Park	2021
Greece	200	Kozani solar project	2022
Guatemala	93	Horus I and II	2016
Honduras	146	Nacaome and Valle Solar Power Plant	
Hungary	233	Mezőcsát	2023
India	2,245	Bhadla Solar Park	2020
Indonesia	145	Cirata Floating Solar Power Plant	2023
Iran	120	Aftab Shargh (East's Sun)	2025
(Republic of Ireland) Ireland	199	Ballymacarney Solar Park	2024
Israel	120	Ze'elim solar park	2021
Italy	103	Troia solar farm	
Jamaica	28	Clarendon solar farm	
Japan	235	Setouchi Kirei Solar Power Plant	
Jordan	200	Baynouna Solar Power Plant	2020
Kazakhstan	100	SES Saran	2019
Kenya	55	Garissa Solar Power Plant	
Madagascar	40	Ambatolampy Solar Power Station	2021
Malaysia	100	ENGIE TTL Kerian Solar PV Park	2022
Mexico	828	Villanueva Solar Park	2018
Maldives	1	Fly Ren	
Mongolia	30	Sainshand solar plant	2019
Namibia	7	Otjikoto solar farm	2018
Nepal	25	Nuwakot Solar Power Station	2020
Netherlands	148.9	Solar Park Dorhout Mees	2022
New Zealand	63	Lauriston Solar Farm	2025
Norway	7	Furuseth solar	2024
Pakistan	400	Quaid-e-Azam Solar Park	2025
Peru	180	Rubi Solar Power Plant	
Philippines	150	Concepcion Solar Farm	2019
Poland	204	Zwartowo	2022
Portugal	219	Alcoutim plant	2021
Qatar	800	Al Kharsaah solar power plant	2022
Romania	155	Rătești Solar Park	2023
Russia	115.6	Arshanskaya Solar Power Station	2021
Saudi Arabia	1,500	Sudair Solar PV Project	2023
Serbia	11	DeLasol	2023
Spain	590	Francisco Pizarro Photovolatic Plant	2022
Senegal	30	Santhiou-Mekhe	
South Africa	540	Kenhardt Solar Power Complex Station	2024
Sweden	100	Hultsfred solar farm	2025
Switzerland	22	Wittenbach Solar PV Park-1	2012
Thailand	126	Tambol Huawai	
Togo	70	Blitta Solar Power Station	2023
Tunisia	10	Tozeur plant	
Turkey	1,350	Kalyon Karapınar Solar Power Plant	2023
United Arab Emirates	1,177	Noor Abu Dhabi	
United Kingdom	373	Cleve Hill Solar Park	2025
United States	802	Copper Mountain Solar Facility^{(b)}	2021
Uruguay	64.8	La Jacinta	2024
Uganda	20	Kabulasoke Solar Power Station^{(b)}	2018
Ukraine	246	Nikopol Solar Park	
Vietnam	831	Xuan Thien - Ea Sup 1	2020
(b) capacity given in MW_{AC} otherwise in MW_{DC}

== See also ==
- Community solar farm
- List of solar thermal power stations
- List of energy storage projects
- List of largest power stations in the world
- List of rooftop photovoltaic installations
- List of renewable energy topics by country
- Photovoltaic power station
- Photovoltaics
- Renewable energy commercialization
- Renewable energy industry
- Renewable energy in the European Union
- Solar energy
- Solar power satellite
