= Cottbus-Drewitz Solarpark =

Photovoltaic power station in Germany

- Country: Germany
- Location: Cottbus-Drewitz, Brandenburg
- Coordinates: 51°56′N 14°32′E
- Construction began: August 2011
- Commission date: October 2011
- Construction cost: 58 million euros

Solar farm
- Type: Flat-panel PV
- Site area: 75.9 hectares (187.6 acres)

Power generation
- Nameplate capacity: 30.2 MW
- Annual net output: 27.68 GWh

The Cottbus-Drewitz Solarpark is a 30.2-megawatt (40,500 hp) photovoltaic power station, located on a former military airfield. It was completed in 11 weeks using Suntech STP 280 Wp panels.

== See also ==
- Photovoltaic power stations
- List of photovoltaic power stations
