= Neuhardenberg Solar Park =

Photovoltaic power plant in Germany

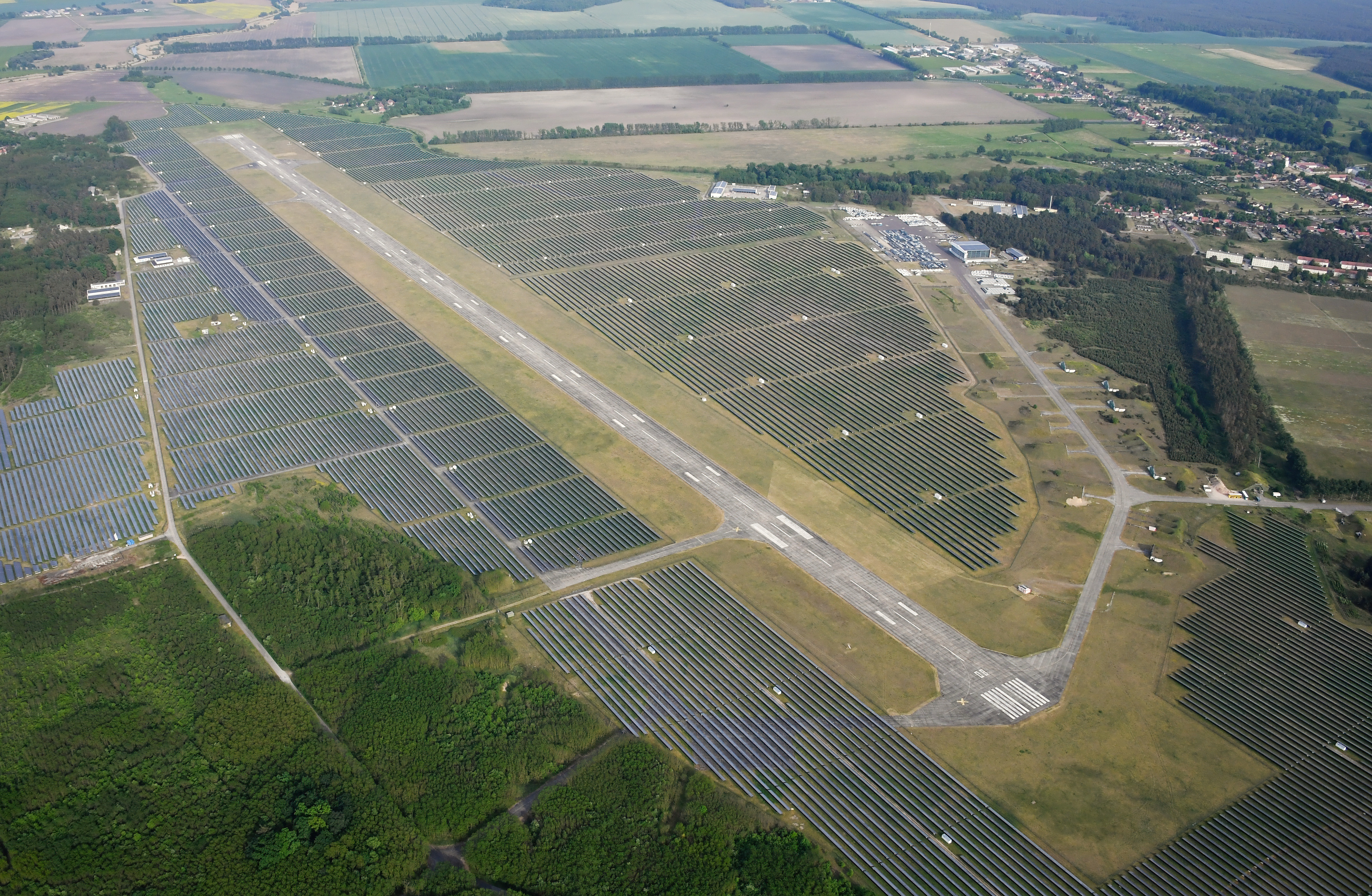
- Country: Germany
- Location: Neuhardenberg
- Coordinates: 52°36′50″N 14°14′33″E
- Status: Operational
- Commission date: 30 September 2012
- Construction cost: EUR 280 million (USD 365 million)
- Owner: Solarhybrid

Solar farm
- Type: Flat-panel PV
- Site area: 240 ha

Power generation
- Units operational: 600,000
- Nameplate capacity: 145 MW

Neuhardenberg Solar Park is a 145-megawatt (MW) photovoltaic power plant, and was Europe's largest solar power station, located at the former Neuhardenberg military airport in Brandenburg, Germany.

In 2015 a solar battery storage facility with a rated power of 5 MW and 5 MWh capacity was added, which was commissioned in mid 2016.

== See also ==
- Photovoltaic power stations
- List of largest power stations in the world
- List of photovoltaic power stations
