= Kenhardt Solar Power Complex Station =

Solar farm complex in South Arica

- Official name: Kenhardt Solar Power Stations
- Country: South Africa
- Location: Kenhardt, Northern Cape
- Coordinates: 29°19′09″S 21°09′33″E
- Status: Operational
- Construction began: July 2022
- Commission date: December 2023
- Construction cost: US$1 billion
- Owner: Scatec
- Operator: Scatec

Solar farm
- Type: Flat-panel PV

Power generation
- Nameplate capacity: 540 MW (720,000 hp)

The Kenhardt Solar Power Complex Station is a 540 MW (720,000 hp) solar power plant complex in South Africa. The complex comprises three power stations each with generation capacity of 180 megawatts. The three power plants feed their output into a battery energy storage system (BESS) with capacity of 225MW/1,140MWh, which modulates the power output to discharge a consistent 150 MW for 16.5 hours daily between the hours of 5am and 9.30pm.

== Location ==
The power station complex is located in the town of Kenhardt, in Kai ǃGarib Local Municipality, in ZF Mgcawu District, in the Northern Cape Province of South Africa. Kenhardt is located approximately 117 kilometres (73 mi) south of Upington, the location of the district headquarters.

== Overview ==
The three power stations are Kenhardt Solar Power Plants 1, 2 and 3. The powerplants are located in close proximity on adjacent plots. Together, the energy complex supports 2,000,000 solar photovoltaic units collectively generating 540 megawatts of power.

The solar power output of the three stations is fed into a lithium battery storage system with capacity of 225MW/1,140MWh. The BESS modulates the power and dispatches a consistent 150MW for 16.5 hours daily, between 5am until 9.30pm. The off-taker is Eskom, the national electricity public utility company. A 20-year power purchase agreement (PPA) governs the terms of sale and purchase of the electricity between the parties.

== Developers ==
The power station is owned and was developed by a consortium of Scatec, a Norwegian independent power producer, and H1 Holdings Plc., a South African BEE company based in Cape Town. The table below illustrates the shareholding the solar power complex.

Kenhardt Solar Power Complex Station Shareholding
Rank	Shareholder	Domicile	Percentage	Notes
1	Scatec	Norway	51.00	
2	H1 Holdings Plc.	South Africa	49.00	
	Total		100.00	

== Costs and commissioning ==
The construction costs are reported as ZAR:16.4 billion (approx. US$962 million). Construction began in July 2022 and commercial commissioning was effected in December 2023. Scatec was assigned the engineering, procurement and construction (EPC) contract, as well as the operations and maintenance (O&M) contract.

== Funding ==
This renewable infrastructure project received funding from a consortium of banks and development finance institutions. It is reported that ZAR:12.4 billion ($727 million) was borrowed from a group of financial institutions including Standard Bank Group, the arranger and British International Investment (BII).

== See also ==
- List of power stations in South Africa
