= Noor Abu Dhabi =

Noor Abu Dhabi solar power plant

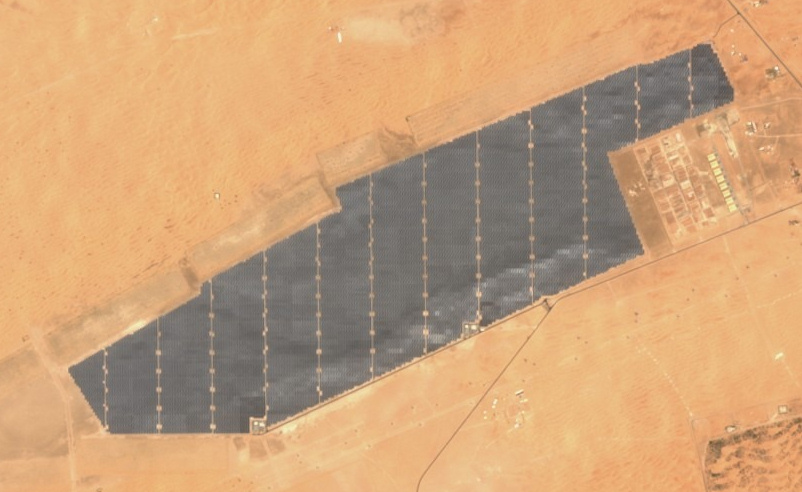
- Country: United Arab Emirates
- Coordinates: 24°32′33″N 55°26′38″E
- Status: Operational
- Commission date: 2019; 7 years ago
- Construction cost: $870 million
- Owner: Sweihan PV Power Company

Power generation
- Nameplate capacity: 1.117 GW

External links
- Commons: Related media on Commons

The Noor Abu Dhabi is the world's largest single-site solar power plant as of November 2022, located in Sweihan, near Abu Dhabi.

== Description ==
Noor Abu Dhabi has 3.2 million solar panels.

Noor is the Arabic word for "light".

The generating capacity is 1.177 GW; the total project cost is US$870 million. The plant provides power for 90,000 individuals in Abu Dhabi. It uses a waterless robotic technology to clean the solar panels. The robots travel a distance of 1600 kilometres every day to clean the panels.

The plant is operated by Sweihan PV Power Company which is governed by the Abu Dhabi National Energy Company (TAQA). It is a joint venture between the Abu Dhabi Government and a consortium of China's Jinko Solar Holding and Japan's Marubeni Corp. The plant was commissioned by India-based solar epc contractor Sterling and Wilson Solar. The plant produced a total of 2000 GWh at an efficiency rate of 93%, giving electricity to 66000 houses in September 2020.

== History ==
The plant started commercial operations on April 30, 2019.

== Achievements and awards ==
The plant attracted the world's most competitive tariff bid in 2016, at 8.888 fils/kWh. It was awarded Utility Project of the Year at the 2020 Middle East Solar Awards and the Power Generation Project of the Year at the MEED Projects Awards 2020.
