= SES Saran =

Solar power plant in Kazakhstan

SES Saran Solar Plant
- Country: Kazakhstan
- Location: Saran, Kazakhstan
- Coordinates: 49°46′59″N 72°50′59″E
- Status: Completed in 2019
- Commission date: 2019
- Owner: SES Saran LLP

Solar farm
- Type: Flat-panel PV
- Site area: 1.64 km^{2} (0.63 sq mi)

Power generation
- Nameplate capacity: 100MW
- Annual net output: 140.116 GWh

SES Saran Solar Plant is a photovoltaic power station with a total capacity of 100 MWp which corresponds to an annual production of approximately 140.116 GWh. It is located in Saran, Kazakhstan, on an area of 1.64 km^{2} (0.63 sq mi).

== Environmental impact ==
The plant will help reduce CO_{2} emissions by 93,500 tonnes per year, according to the European Bank for Reconstruction and Development.
