= Solar power in Saudi Arabia =

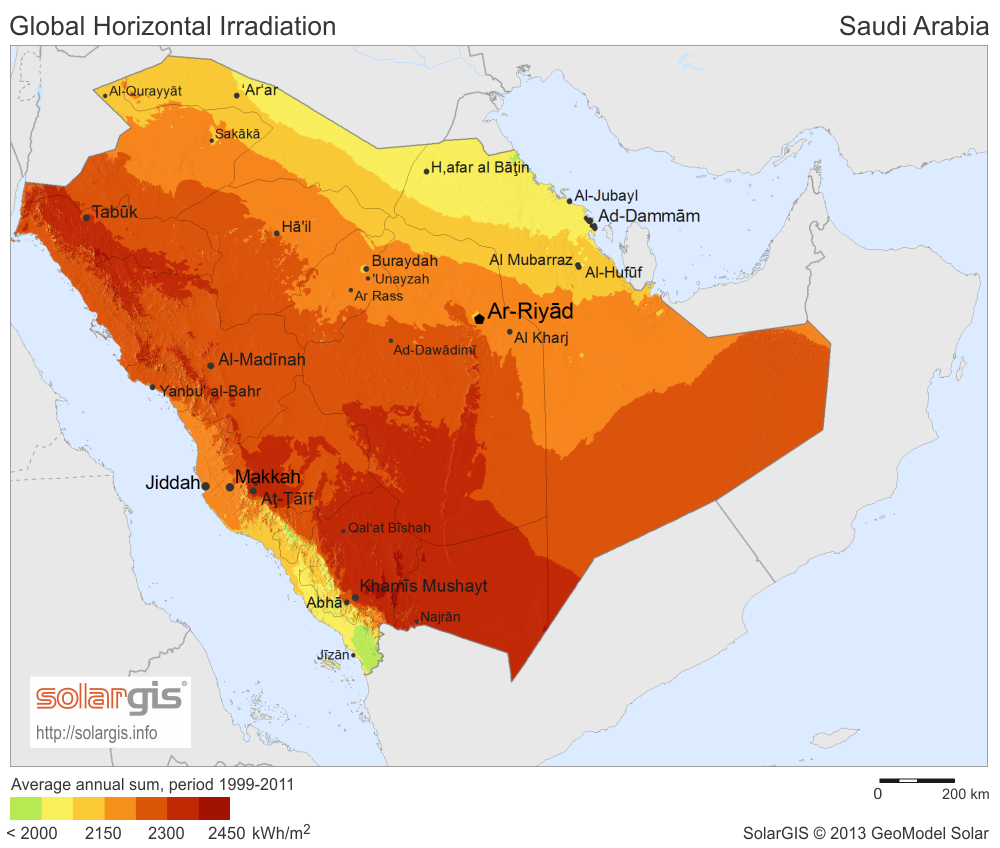
Solar potential

Solar power in Saudi Arabia has become more important to the country as oil prices have risen. Saudi Arabia is located in the Arabian Peninsula, where it receives 12 hours of sun a day. Saudi Arabia has the potential to supply its electrical needs solely with solar power. As the largest oil producer and exporter in the world and one of the largest carbon dioxide producers Saudi Arabia would set an important precedent in renewable energy by shifting to solar power. In 2021, 60.89% of energy consumed was produced by burning oil. The Saudi agency in charge of developing the nations renewable energy sector, Ka-care, announced in May 2012 that the nation would install 41 gigawatts (GW) of solar capacity by 2032. It was projected to be composed of 25 GW of solar thermal, and 16 GW of photovoltaics. At the time of this announcement, Saudi Arabia had only 0.003 gigawatts of installed solar energy capacity. A total of 54 GW was expected by 2032, and 24 GW was expected in 2020, which was never reached. 1,100 megawatts (MW) of photovoltaics and 900 megawatts of concentrated solar thermal (CSP) was expected to be completed by early 2013. Also in 2013, solar power in Saudi Arabia had achieved grid parity and was able to produce electricity at costs comparable to conventional sources.

In March 2018 Saudi Arabia announced that together with Softbank they plan to install 200 GW of solar power through 2030. This compares to a global solar power installation of 100 GW in 2017 and a total installed capacity of 77 GW in Saudi Arabia in 2016. This project was cancelled in September 2018.

The National Renewable Energy Program (NREP), backed by the Public Investment Fund (PIF), outlines plans for 11.8 GW of renewable energy projects in collaboration with ACWA Power by 2025, subject to approval from the Ministry of Energy. This initiative aligns with the goal of generating 50% of electricity from renewable sources by 2030.

== Projects ==
- In 2014, researchers at King Fahd University of Petroleum and Minerals (KFUPM) in Dhahran successfully tested a solar-powered ammonia-water absorption refrigeration system. The system used solar thermal collectors to power an absorption chiller and incorporated ice storage to support cooling when solar energy was unavailable. Experimental results demonstrated a cooling capacity of 10.1kW with a coefficient of performance (COP) of 0.69 under operating conditions that reflected that of Dhahran. As solar powered cooling systems become more widespread in Saudi Arabia, the success of this project provides support for future solar cooling systems.
- The Sakaka solar plant is located in Sakaka City, Saudi Arabia. Construction on the project began in November 2018 and the project finished in November 2019. The plant produces roughly 900 GWh of electricity per year, which mitigated the release of 600,000 tons of carbon dioxide. Additionally, Sakaka powers over 75,000 homes.
- Conergy is a Germany-based solar energy company that wanted to branch out into the Saudi Arabian market. Conergy believes that Saudi Arabia and other countries in the Middle East have a lot of market potential for solar power due to their desert conditions with more sunlight. In Saudi Arabia, Conergy fulfilled three projects surrounding installing solar panels on rooftops. The energy production totaled 2.5 MW.
- Haradh Solar PV Park is a solar park is located in the Eastern Province of Saudi Arabia. Its capacity is 300 MW. Construction on the project began in 2020 and finished in 2021, with the solar park currently online. Every year, Haradh Solar PV Park offsets 53000 tons of carbon dioxide. The project was commissioned by a company called Engie, which produces and trades energy. Engie sells the energy produced by this solar park to National Agricultural Development, a company based in Saudi Arabia, for $0.03 per kWh.
- In November 2022, ACWA Power and the Water and Electricity Holding Company (Badeel) entered into an agreement to construct the world's largest single-site solar power plant in Al Shuaibah, Mecca province, scheduled to commence operations in 2025. The project, set to have a capacity of 2,060 MW, supports Saudi Arabia's strategy to expand its renewable energy capacity to 15 GW by 2022–2023, in line with the broader objectives of the country's Vision 2030 plan and its aim for carbon neutrality by 2050.

== History ==
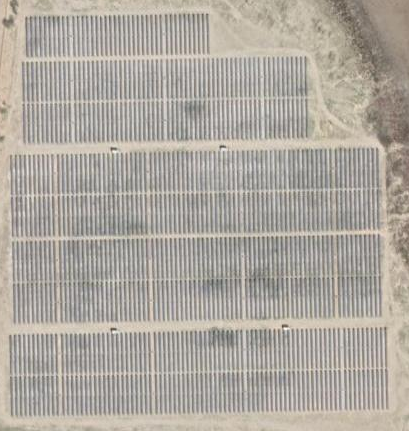
A solar station in Khafji

In 2011, The United States and Saudi Arabia jointly set up a solar-research station in Al-Uyaynah village. The village, located about 30 miles northwest of Riyadh, had no electric supply at the time. The station is operated by the King Abdulaziz City for Science and Technology. The agency established an experimental assembly line at the site to manufacture solar panels. The equipment on the assembly line was imported from Europe, and the solar cells are imported from Taiwan. The line's capacity was quadrupled within a year.

Saudi Arabia's first solar power plant was commissioned on October 2, 2011, on Farasan Island. It is a 500 kW fixed tilt photovoltaic plant.

Given that the cost of solar projects decreased by roughly 90 percent in the 2010s, petrostates in the Middle East have raised their ambitions. Saudi Arabia had about 500 megawatts of renewable electricity capacity in 2020, but targets 60 gigawatts, most of which would come from solar photovoltaics and concentrated solar power, by 2030. This has incentivized announcements for private sector solar projects which have a highly competitive bid price in terms of levelized cost of electricity.

As its needs have increased, Saudi Arabia’s energy crisis has also risen in urgency. From 1975 to 2010, there was a nearly 45 GW increase in the country’s energy consumption. Nearing the end of 2012, Saudi Arabia went beyond its designated power capacity by 1500 GW, and this was expected to grow to encompass nearly 13% of the world’s power needs. As a large powerhouse for oil production, with nearly 11 million barrels of oil produced in 2015, Saudi Arabia’s shift towards solar energy is needed to keep up with their immense energy consumption.

Saudi Arabia has been implementing solar energy projects since the early 1960s. In addition to its 3,281 MWh producing photovoltaic solar rooftop, Saudi Arabia created the world’s biggest solar parking lot, with a capacity of 4500 cars. Furthermore, it houses the largest thermal plant that provides hot water for nearly 40,000 students at Princess Noura University for Women.

In 2013, the King Abdullah City for Atomic and Renewable Energy (KA-CARE) set a target of 54 GW of renewable energy by 2032, which was met with support from developers and investors around the world. However, no progress followed and a more realistic goal of 9.5 GW by 2023

As of 2023, Saudi Arabia is still trailing other wealthy countries in solar power capacity rankings, ranking 45 worldwide, despite being one of the top countries in solar potential. Oil and gas still make up most of Saudi Arabia’s power mix, with 0.5% of the mix being solar power.

== Types ==
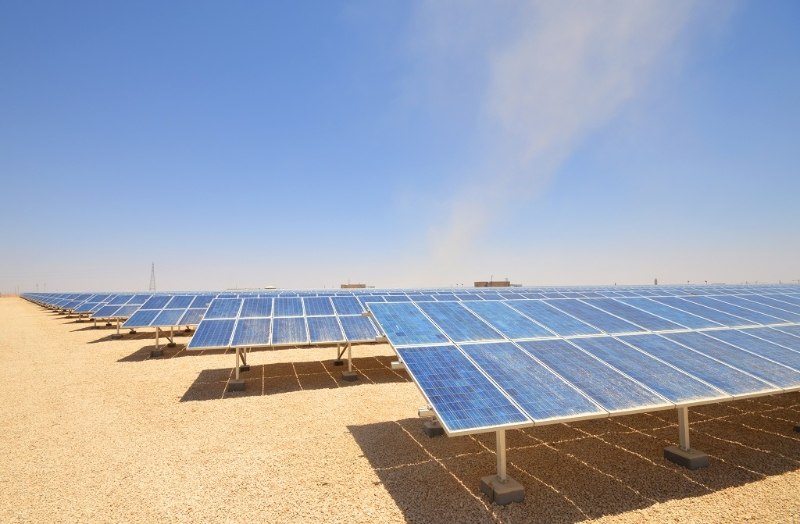
Photovoltaic power station at Kapsarc

The main technologies Saudi Arabia employs are photovoltaic and concentrated solar power.

Of these two, photovoltaic (PV) systems are the most commonly applied throughout Saudi Arabia. They produce clean electricity by converting solar energy through semiconductor materials. Between different PV systems, research shows that sun-tracking systems such as the 1-axis tracking system and the 2-axis tracking system produce the greatest amount of energy compared to fixed systems. They increased electricity production by 28–33%. Sun tracking systems work by varying the angles of solar panels throughout the day based on the Sun's movement across the sky to ensure they are consistently capturing the most solar energy possible. The 2-axis tracking system is slightly more efficient than the 1-axis, but the difference is considered negligible.

Types of solar power include fixed and sun-tracking PV systems for electricity generation. One research study examined the performance of PV systems at 32 locations across Saudi Arabia using solar radiation measurements collected between March 2013 and February 2025. The study compared three types of PV configurations: 1-axis tracking systems, 2-axis tracking systems, and fixed-tilt panels. Their performance was evaluated using energy yield, capacity factor, and performance ratio. Simulation results indicated high energy productivity across all 32 locations, with performance indicators comparing favorably to similar PV systems in other countries.

Saudi Arabia has also explored concentrated solar power (CSP) due to its potential to store the thermal energy, which can then be accessed later when there is greater demand or shortage. Among the CSP systems, the country is focusing on parabolic trough, solar tower, linear Fresnel, and parabolic dish. All of these are considered viable options due to their high yield, retention capabilities, and most importantly, Saudi Arabia's Direct Normal Irradiance (DNI). DNI is the measure of solar radiation per unit of land that is orthogonal (at right angles) to the direction of the sunlight. Thus, the higher this value, the more effective the CSP system. However, the initial expenses of setting up a CSP system are very high, necessitating the use of hybridized systems including photovoltaic systems to mitigate the costs.

== Growth and manufacturing ==
=== Growth ===
Saudi Arabia’s geographical location provides high levels of solar irradiance, with an average of approximately 2500 kWh/m^{2} per year. The country’s extensive desert areas are suitable for solar energy installations.

Installed renewable capacity was projected to exceed 40 GW by the end of 2028. The Kingdom's cumulative solar capacity could reach 67.2 GW by 2030, below the pace needed to meet the Vision 2030 target of 130 GW of renewable capacity.

=== Manufacturing ===
In January 2019, Saudi Arabia’s National Industrial Clusters Development Program (NICDP) and Saudi Basic Industries Corporation (SABIC) announced plans for a solar and carbon black manufacturing complex in partnership with China’s solar manufacturer LONGi and South Korean polysilicon producer OCI.

In July 2024, the Public Investment Fund (PIF) signed joint-venture agreements with the Chinese manufacturers JinkoSolar and TCL Zhonghuan to bring 30 GW of solar manufacturing capacity to Saudi Arabia. This covers production ranging from solid blocks of silicon (ingots) to finished solar panels. TCL Zhonghuan’s venture is planned to produce 20 GW of ingots and thin slices of silicon (wafers) per year.

== Government policy ==
The Saudi government’s solar power plans are part of Vision 2030, a national plan launched in 2016 to reduce the country’s dependence on oil. The Ministry of Energy runs the National Renewable Energy Program (NREP) which aims to reach 130 gigawatts of renewable capacity by 2030.

=== Vision 2030 ===
Under Vision 2030, the government set a goal of producing about half of the country’s electricity from renewable sources by 2030. It initially targeted 27.3 GW of renewable capacity by 2023 and 58.7 GW by 2030. The 2030 target was divided into about 40 GW of solar, 16 GW of wind and 2.7 GW from other renewable sources. The latest version of Vision 2030 raised the target to 130 GW by 2030.

In 2022, analysts said the near-term target would not be met, and the consultancy GlobalData forecast that renewables would supply 6.8% of Saudi electricity in 2030. In 2023, the Economist Intelligence Unit (EIU) said the government was unlikely to achieve its 2030 targets. GlobalData reported that the country's capacity was not growing fast enough to meet the 130 GW target in 2016. The Economist Intelligence Unit (EIU) has described the government's interest in renewable energy as mainly commercial. The government's goals are to become the world's lowest-cost producer of renewable energy and to save more of the country's oil and gas for export.

The Saudi Green Initiative, launched in March 2021, includes a goal of increasing the share of renewable energy in the country’s energy mix. Saudi Arabia joined the International Solar Alliance in 2021. The Public Investment Fund has invested in ACWA Power, a renewable energy developer.

=== NREP ===
The Ministry of Energy runs the NREP through the Renewable Energy Project Development Office (REPDO), created in 2017. REPDO is responsible for research, regulation, project preparation and tendering, and it works with the King Abdullah City for Atomic and Renewable Energy (K.A.CARE), the Electricity and Cogeneration Regulatory Authority (ECRA) and the Saudi Electricity Company to develop independent power projects at more than 35 sites.The program also aims to localize the renewable energy supply chain and create domestic jobs.

The program’s sixth tender round concluded in 2025 and awarded 3 GW of solar capacity. According to pv magazine, one of the winning bids had the second-lowest levelized cost of electricity on record for a solar project. In October 2025, the Saudi Power Procurement Company awarded contracts worth more than SAR 9 billion (US$2.4 billion) for four solar projects and one wind project, with a combined capacity of 4.5 GW. One of these, the 0.6 GW Samtah solar plant in Jazan Province, was awarded to a consortium of the Saudi Electricity Company and EDF Power Solutions at a levelized cost of about 1.49 US cents per kilowatt-hour.

== Applications ==
=== Residential ===
In Saudi Arabia, the estimated monthly average PV output for 3 types of residential buildings suggests that renewable energy can cover 62.4% of the primary load for villas, 66.5% for traditional houses, and 68.2% for apartments, with the rest of the primary load provided by the Saudi Arabia national grid.

=== Commercial ===
In Saudi Arabia, rooftop PV on public buildings has a regional impact of 1.02 million tons of CO2 avoided per year and a 48% reduction in net present cost for the central region, which receives around 2200kWh per square meter per year of solar radiation. This helps reduce fossil fuel electricity consumption and supports Saudi Arabia’s national decarbonization vision, while also reducing costs for public institutions. According to REPDO, 13 renewable energy projects (12 of which are solar power projects) have been developed in Saudi Arabia since 2018 with a capacity of around 3.7 GW. More advanced technologies such as complex tracking systems, high-efficiency inverters and sophisticated monitoring systems are being developed for solar plants in Saudi Arabia. Saudi Arabia’s renewable energy powered mega city project NEOM is expected to be a testing ground for the application of next-generation solar technologies, large-scale energy storage and smart grid systems.

== Response ==
Saudi Arabia's public interest in solar energy is similarly affected by social acceptance, finances, politics, and awareness. A recent study shows that residential solar photovoltaic systems (RSPSs) are desirable among respondents of varying backgrounds. However, 79.7% of those surveyed would consider solar only if 40% of the upfront costs were subsidized, and most would avoid adoption if their monthly electric bill increased by more than 10 SAR (about 2.5 USD). Achieving widespread solar adoption and support in Saudi Arabia relies heavily on financial incentives and broader public approval. While public interest in solar power is rising, there remains a gap in sufficient knowledge regarding particular costs, practicality, and potential financial assistance for solar assistance among Saudi Arabian residents.

== Future ==
Saudi Arabia is striving to transition its reliance on fossil fuels to renewable energy sources within the next two decades. The government plans to produce 41 GW of solar energy by 2040 and invest $108.9 billion by 2032. Part of this initiative is The Line, a proposed car-free, self-sustaining city in the Neom region powered entirely by renewable energy, with solar power as a primary source. The Neom region was chosen for its solar energy levels of 20 megajoules per square meter and average wind speeds of 6.2 meters per second. The government hopes The Line and other solar mega projects in development will redefine energy production and technology in Saudi Arabia.

== See also ==
- Energy in Saudi Arabia
