= Cauchari Solar Plant =

Photovoltaic power station in Jujuy, Argentina

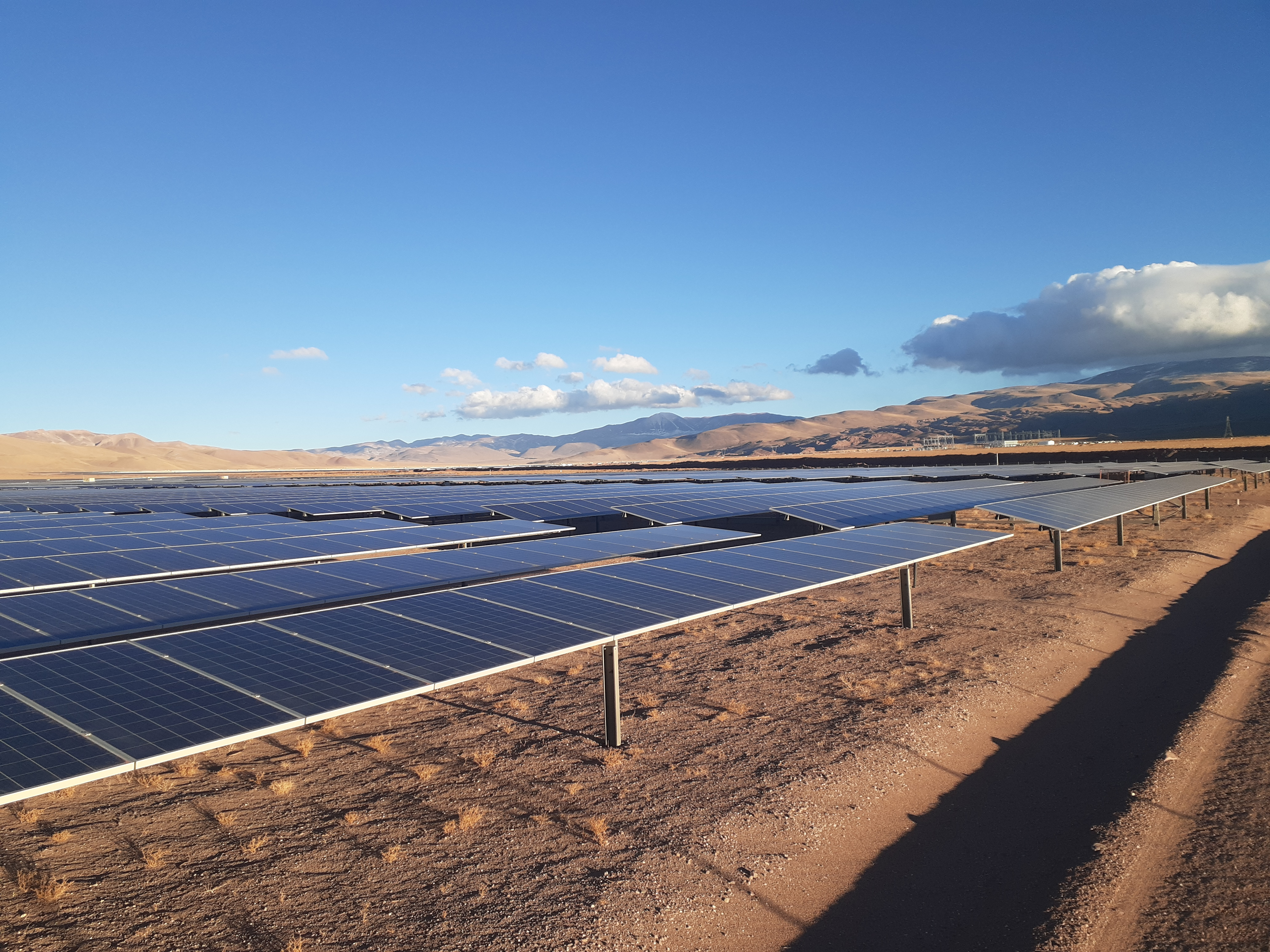
- Country: Argentina
- Location: Cauchari, Jujuy Province
- Coordinates: 24.0950°S 66.7237°W
- Status: Completed in 2020
- Construction began: 2018
- Commission date: 2020
- Construction cost: US$390 million
- Owner: Jujuy Energía y Minería Sociedad del Estado

Solar farm
- Type: Flat-panel PV

Power generation
- Nameplate capacity: 300MW
- Annual net output: 660 GWh/yr

External links
- Commons: Related media on Commons

Cauchari Solar Plant is a photovoltaic power station with a total power capacity of 300MW which corresponds to an annual production of approximately 660 GWh. It is located in Cauchari, Jujuy Province. At an attitude of over 4000 meters, it is the highest altitude solar power plant in the world.

== Social impacts ==
Represents close ties between China & Argentina within the BRI. Furthermore, Argentina's feed-in tariffs for solar projects made it attractive to Chinese investments

== Environmental impacts ==
Reduces carbon emissions by around 325,000 tonnes.
