= Sinan Solar Power Plant =

Photovoltaic power stations in South Korea

The Sinan solar power plant is a 24 MW photovoltaic power station in Sinan, Jeollanam-do, South Korea. As of 2009, it is the largest photovoltaic installation in Asia. The project was developed by the German company Conergy and it cost US$150 million. It was built by the Dongyang Engineering & Construction Corporation.

== See also ==
- Photovoltaic power stations
