= Gujarat Solar Park-1 =

Solar power plant

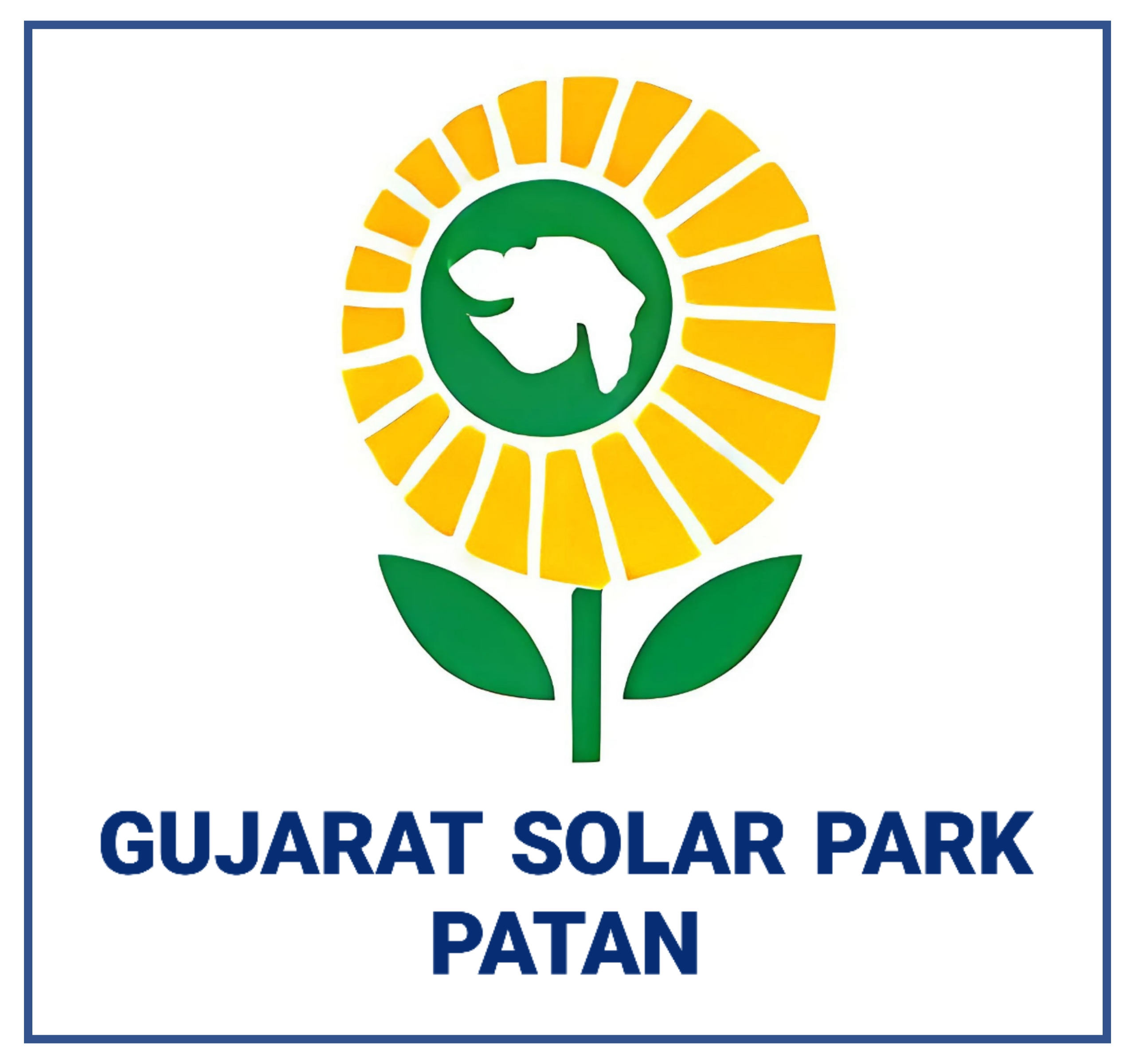
- Country: India
- Location: Patan district
- Coordinates: 23°54′N 71°12′E
- Status: Operational
- Construction began: 2010
- Commission date: 2012

Solar farm
- Type: Flat-panel PV
- Site area: 2,000 ha (4,900 acres) Site plan

Power generation
- Units operational: 615 MW
- Nameplate capacity: 615 MW

Gujarat Solar Park-1 (also called Charanka Solar Park) is a solar power plant near Charanka village in Patan district of Gujarat, India. It is spread over an area of 2,000 hectares(4,900 acres). It has installed generation capacity of about 600 MW, as 2018. More 190 MW are under installation.

== Timeline ==
Inaugurated in 2012 by the then Chief Minister of Gujarat Narendra Modi, it was home to about 250 MW capacity initially. On 19 April 2012, a total of 214 megawatts (287,000 hp) had been commissioned. It also became the world's third largest photo voltaic power station.

345 MW had been installed by March 2016.

The Gujarat Power Corporation Limited (GPCL), the project's primary developer, said in April, 2018 that further capacity addition of 150 MW taking the total to 790 MW may be opted for soon given the availability of land in the Park.

So far, the park has witnessed investments of Rs 5,365 crore and generated 3,441 million units till date.

Installed generation capacity is at about 615 MW at present, having been commissioned by 31 developers in the Solar Park. GACL (Gujarat Alkalies and Chemicals Limited) is setting up 30 MW Solar PV plant, and GNFC (Gujarat Narmada Valley Fertilizers and Chemicals) is in the process of setting up 10 MW project.

Projects of 95MW are under construction and 30MW under planning as of December, 2018. As of March 2022, the Gujarat Solar Park-1 has an installed capacity of 730 MW, with an additional 20 MW under implementation.

=== Power purchase agreement ===
Rs 15 (about US$0.29) per kWh for the first 12 years and Rs 5 (about US$0.10) per kWh from the 13th to 25th year. The national solar policy has fixed tariffs of Rs17 for photovoltaic and Rs15 for solar thermal for 25 years.

About 600 MW were completed prior to the deadline of 28 January 2012 to receive the above tariff. Systems completed after that date are subject to a lower tariff. As of 2022, 730 MW Solar Projects have been commissioned by 36 developers. Further, projects of 20 MW power capacities are under implementation. Solar Park has also capacity to generate 4.2 MW of Wind Power and already two Wind Mills, each of 2.1 MW has been commissioned making the Park.

Developers at Gujarat Solar Park-1
Developer	MWp
AES Solar Energy Gujarat Pvt. Ltd.	15
Alex Asatral Power Pvt. Ltd.	25
Avatar	5
Emami Cement Ltd.	10
GMR Gujarat Solar Power Pvt. Ltd.	25
GPCL	5
GPPC Pipavav Power Company Ltd.	5
Kiran Energy Solar Power Pvt. Ltd.(Solar Field)	20
Lanco Solar Pvt. Ltd.,	15
NKG Infrastructure Ltd.	10
Palace Solar Energy Pvt. Ltd.	15
Roha Dyechem Pvt. Ltd.	25
Sun Clean Renewable Power Pvt. Ltd.	6
Sun Edison Energy India Pvt. Ltd.	25
Surana Telecom & Power Ltd.	5
Yantra	5
ZF Steering Gear (India) Ltd.	5
EIT	1
Universal Solar	2
GSECL	10
GPCL NEW	10
Kindle Eng and Construction	50
Torrent Solargen	51
Total	345

== Criticism ==
The solar park has been set up on the traditional migration routes of a semi-nomadic shepherd people. The government had not consulted them.

In addition, many locals claim that the site has led to disadvantage, and not to the opportunities promised by government officials during negotiations. Of the 1000 local jobs promised, only 60 locals are employed, and many have lost access to open grazing areas that once supplemented their sparse lifestyle. In addition it is claimed that promised schools, drinking water, and energy have also not been provided, among other verbal agreements made with local inhabitants.
