= Solar power in Jamaica =

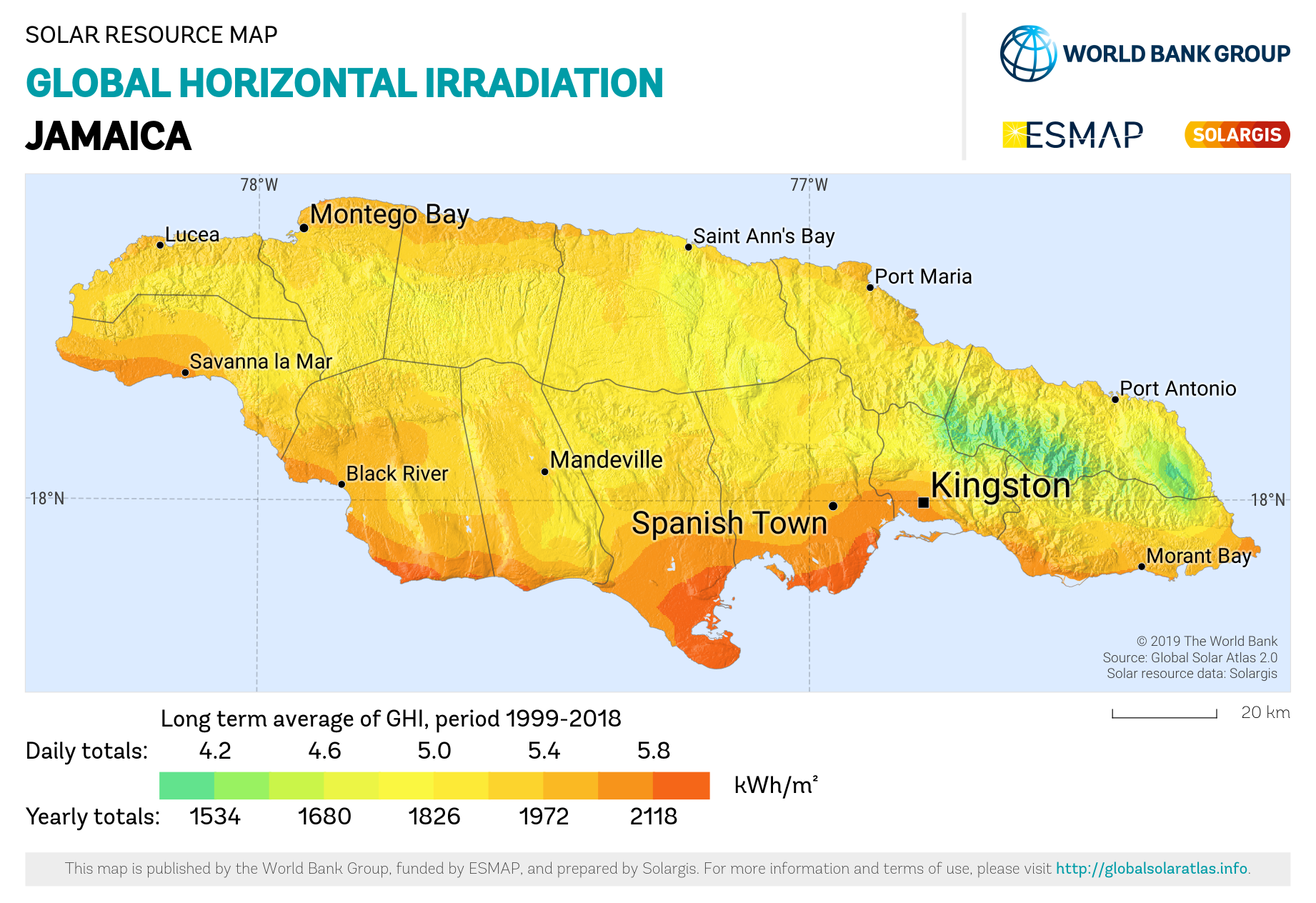
Jamaica's solar potential

Jamaica's electricity sector is dominated by non-renewable generators that use petroleum products, primarily Bunker C fuel oil and automotive diesel which generated 93% of the annual output for 2014. There is a small contribution from a few small hydroelectric plants and a couple of wind farms, one of which, Wigton Wind Farm, contributes a very small amount despite being the largest wind farm in the Caribbean.

In 2005, Jamaica embarked on the preparation of a 25-year National Development Plan called "Vision 2030" which encompassed the National Energy Policy 2009–2030. The policy was adopted in late 2009 and followed in 2010 by a National Renewable Energy Policy 2009–2030. According to the message from the then minister responsible for energy, "Since 2005, Jamaica has embarked upon the preparation of a 25-year National Development Plan called Vision 2030 which is expected to put the country in a path to achieve developed country status by 2030. One of the expected outcomes of the plan is the diversification of Jamaica's energy supply to increase energy security and to contribute to the cost efficiency of the country's energy sector."

After the National Energy Policy was approved the authorities set about creating a regulatory and technical framework for the interconnection of solar PV systems to the national grid in consultation with the grid operator. The result was the formulation of a Standard Offer Contract for the sale of electricity to the grid under a net billing arrangement. Under the net billing arrangement any electricity not consumed on the premises it is produced, is delivered to the grid and is purchased by the grid operator at a price set by the Office of Utilities Regulation to be close to the avoided cost of generation by the existing suppliers. That price is available at the regulators web site. Any electricity consumed from the grid is billed at the regular retail prices and at the end of the month the difference between the delivered and consumed amounts is settled. Technical guidelines for the interconnection to the grid are also now available and the Government Electrical Inspectorate is prepared to perform inspection of installations. This is the basis on which most major installations have proceeded.

== Installed Capacity ==
The following are some of the larger installations currently connected to the grid:

Notable PV projects in Jamaica
Owner	Location/Parish	2012 kWp	2013 kWp	2014 kWp	2015 kWp	2016 kWp	2019 kWp	Year ? kWp	Notes
Content Solar Ltd.	Clarendon					28,000			
Grand Palladium Resort & Spa	Hanover			1,600					Sized and set up to never feed the grid
WISYNCO	White Marl				1,000				
Rainforest Seafoods	Kingston				460				
J. Wray & Nephew Limited	Kingston				450				
Caribbean Producers Jamaica Limited	Montego Bay					450			
Jamaica Broilers	Various		600						15 kW systems at about 40 chicken houses
Omni Industries Limited	Twickenham Park			300					
Rainforest Seafoods	Montego Bay					300			
Toyota Jamaica Limited	Liguanea					170			
Island Grill	Kingston				143				
Caribbean Maritime Institute	Palisadoes				125				
Courts Jamaica Limited	Half Way Tree	113							
May Pen Ice	May Pen				103				
American International School of Kingston	Liguanea		100						
University of Technology	Papine			100					
Hillel Academy	Norbrook							100	
Tankweld Group	Seaward Drive			100					
Tankweld Group	Rio Bueno							100	
Food for the Poor	Spanish Town				100				
Goddard Catering Group	Palisadoes				100				
Stationery & Office Supplies Ltd.	Kingston							75	
Dairy Industries Jamaica Ltd.	Pembroke Hall		60						
Chas E Ramson Ltd.	Kingston		60						
ATL Automotive	Oxford Road		58.8						
Myers Fletcher and Gordon	Kingston			55					Solar-wind hybrid (additional 25 kW wind)
Eight Rivers	Westmorland						51,000		
	Totals	113	878.8	2155	2481	28920	51000	275	85,822 Kilowatt

More than 20,000 Jamaican homes are expected to be powered by clean, affordable, renewable energy to be generated from the US$61 million solar electricity plant, being built in Content District, Clarendon.

Electricity produced by this 20-megawatt plant, the largest of its kind in the Caribbean, will replace approximately 3 million US gallons (11,000 m^{3}) of fossil fuel per year.

Construction of the state-of-the art facility will now get underway, following an official ground breaking ceremony at the site, on July 9 (2015).

== Rural Electrification ==
In June 2012 Energy Minister Phillip Paulwell disclosed that, approximately 16,000 homes in remote parts of the island which do not have electricity are to be supplied with solar or wind electricity through the Rural Electrification Programme (REP). At a USAID-funded Analysis and Investigation for Low Emission (AILEG) project symposium, held at the Jamaica Pegasus Hotel, on Tuesday, July 9, 2013, Energy Minister Phillip Paulwell stated that the REP has also been mandated to complete its target of providing electricity to 100 per cent of rural areas. “Those three per cent that now remain are in areas that are so far from the grid, it is too expensive (to provide), and we are going to be deploying photovoltaic systems in these areas,” he explained. In March 2015 he told a newspaper that, by 2017, "we should no longer have REP in the way we do now", adding that if the Government finds it too challenging to run power lines into communities, it will use solar."

== See also ==
- Solar hybrid power systems
- Jamaica § Energy
