= Cauchari =

Coordinates: 24°04′00″S 66°49′38″W

- Municipality and village
- Interactive map of Cauchari
- Country: Argentina
- Province: Jujuy Province
- Elevation: 13,800 ft (4,200 m)
- Time zone: UTC−3 (ART)

Cauchari is a village and rural municipality in Jujuy Province in northwestern Argentina. It is notable for being the site of a solar park with an expected output of 300MW and, as of 2019, the biggest and highest elevation (4,200 m (13,800 ft)) installation of this type in Latin America.
