= Sweihan =

Sweihan سُوَيْحَان Suwayḩān
- town
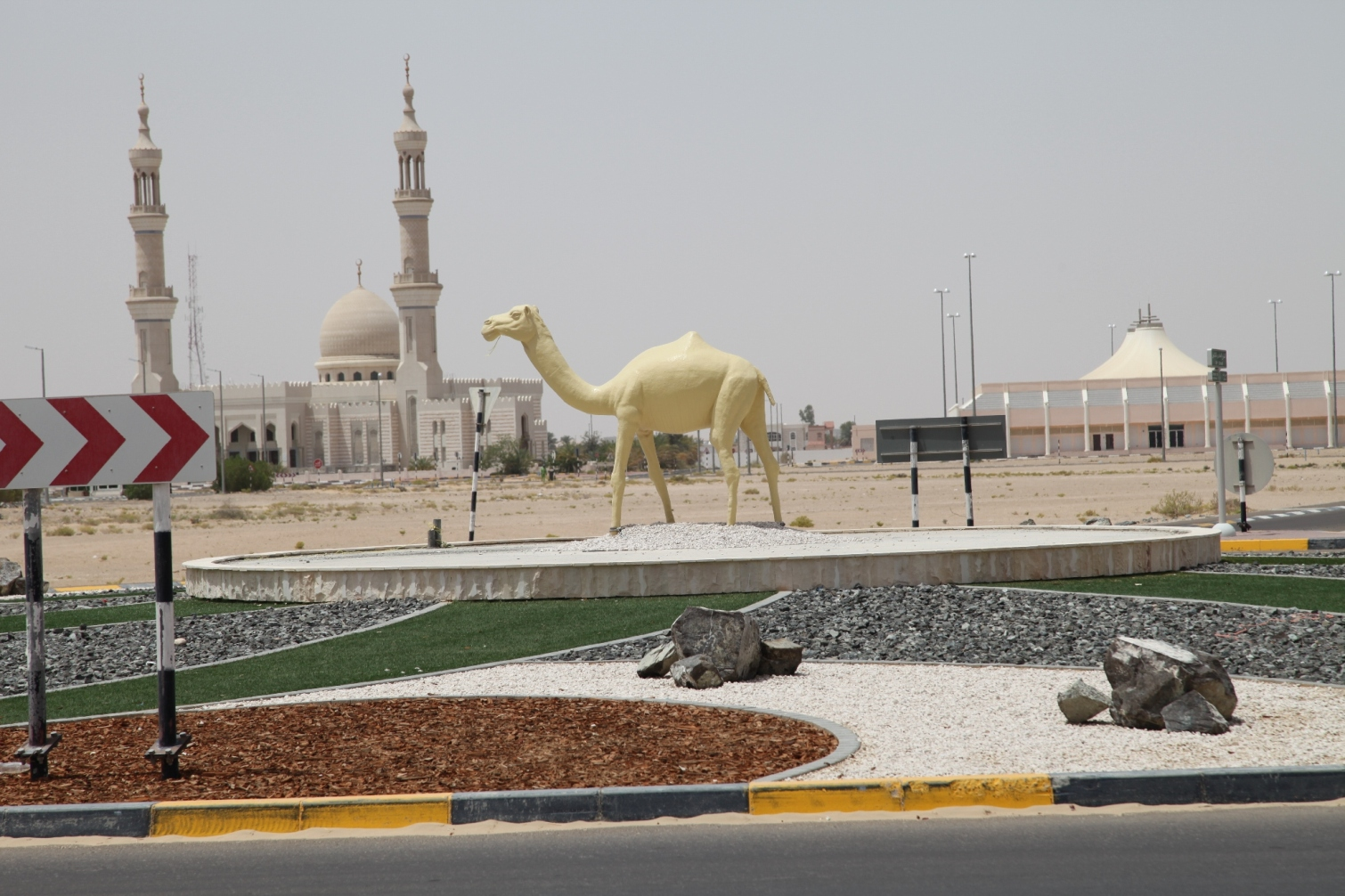
- The Arabian camel is an icon for the town

- Location of Swaihan in the UAE Location of Swaihan in the region of the Persian Gulf Sweihan (West and Central Asia)
- Country: United Arab Emirates
- Emirate: Abu Dhabi
- Municipal region: Al-Ain

Government
  - Type: Absolute monarchy
  - Sheikh: Mohammad bin Zayed Al Nahyan
  - The Emir's Representative: Tahnoun bin Mohammed Al Nahyan

Population (3000)
  - Total: 5,403
- Time zone: UTC+4 (UAE Standard Time)

Sweihan, also spelled Swaihan or Suwayḩān (Arabic: سُوَيْحَان), is a town in Al Ain Region, 70 km (43 miles) northwest of the city of Al Ain in the Emirate of Abu Dhabi, the United Arab Emirates. It is noted for its surrounding farms.

The village is the site of the National Avian Research Centre (aka NARC). It breeds the iconic houbara bustard. The town of Sweihan was founded by the late Saif Al-Mashgouni. The Noor Abu Dhabi solar power plant, the world's largest single plant with 3.2 million solar panels, is located near the town. The highest temperature recorded in the United Arab Emirates was 52.1 °C (126 °F) in July 2002 in Sweihan.

== See also ==
- Al Faqa
