= Solar power by country =

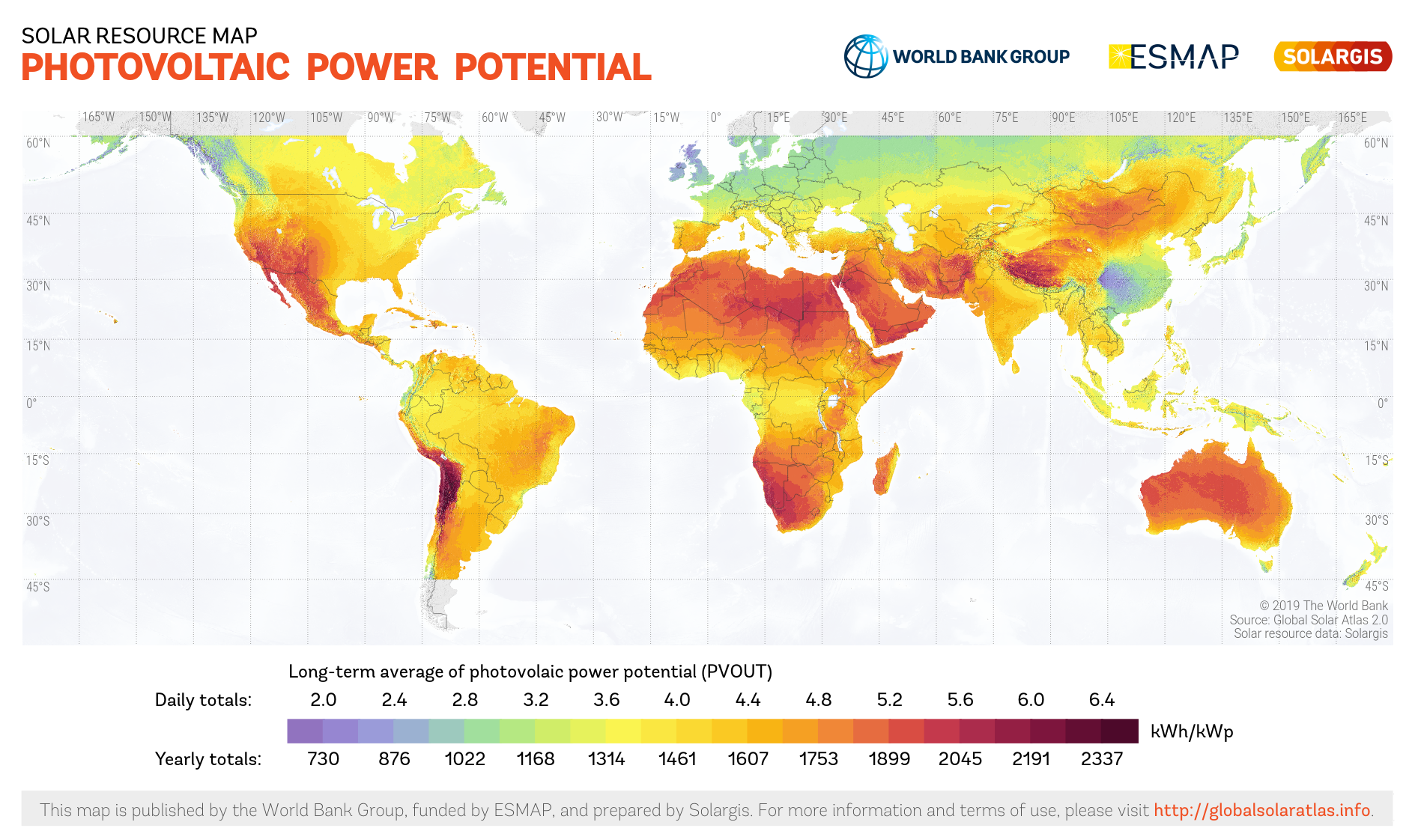
Global photovoltaic power potential

Many countries and territories have installed significant solar power capacity into their electrical grids to supplement or provide an alternative to conventional energy sources. Solar power plants use one of two technologies:

- Photovoltaic (PV) systems use solar panels, either on rooftops or in ground-mounted solar farms, converting sunlight directly into electric power.
- Concentrated solar power (CSP, also known as "concentrated solar thermal") plants use solar thermal energy to make steam, that is thereafter converted into electricity by a turbine.

The majority of new solar power capacity is being deployed in emerging markets (non-OECD countries).

Photovoltaic systems account for the great majority of solar capacity installed in the world. CSP represents a minor share of solar power capacity, and is present in significant quantities only in a few countries. Most operational CSP stations are located in Spain and the United States, while large solar farms using photovoltaics are being constructed in most geographic regions.

The worldwide growth of photovoltaics is extremely dynamic and varies strongly by country. By the end of 2025, global solar capacity reached approximately 2,392 GW according to IRENA (or nearly 2,900 GW per Ember capacity tracking), with solar generation hitting a record 2,778 TWh (up 30% or +636 TWh year-on-year). Solar alone met 75% of the net increase in global electricity demand in 2025; together with wind it met 99%. Renewables overtook coal’s share of global generation for the first time in the modern era (renewables 33.8%). China accounted for more than half of both capacity and generation growth. Solar overtook wind generation globally and approached nuclear levels; both solar and wind are projected to surpass nuclear in 2026.

== Global use figures ==
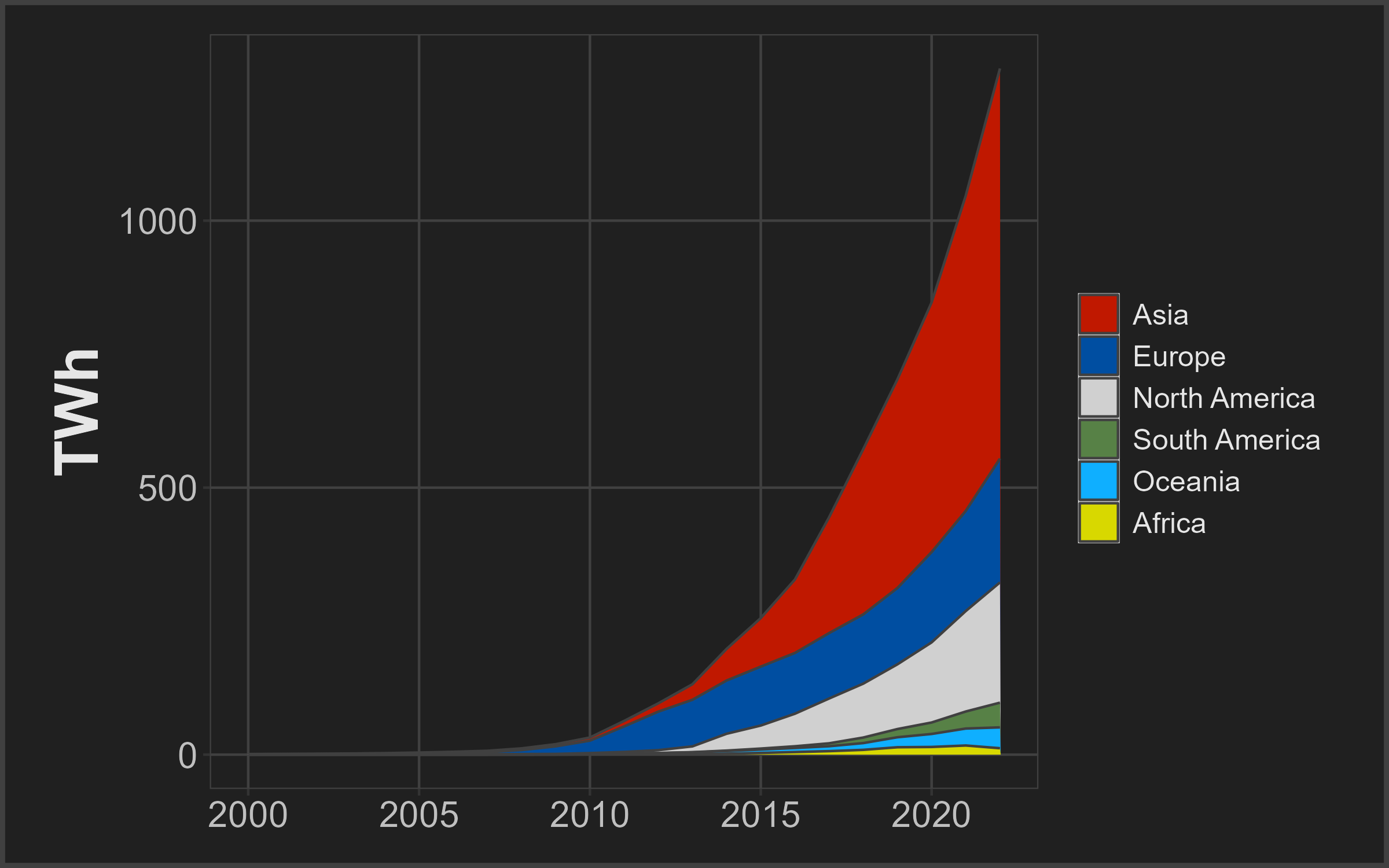
Yearly solar generation by continent

=== Solar photovoltaics (PV) ===
The following table lists this data for each country:

- Total generation from solar in terawatt-hours.
- Percent of that country's generation that was solar.
- Total solar capacity in gigawatts at the end of the year.
- Percent growth in solar capacity year-on-year.
- The solar capacity factor for that year, calculated with the capacity reported. This tends to underestimate the actual capacity factor when growth is high.
- Capacity per capita, in watts, calculated by dividing total solar capacity in watts by country's most recently available population, which can be found on the demographics page (e.g., Demographics of Spain).

Data are sourced from Ember and refer to the year 2025, unless otherwise specified. The table only includes countries with more than 0.1 TWh of generation. Links for each location go to the relevant solar power page, when available.

Solar statistics by country in 2025
Country	Gen. (TWh)	% gen.	Cap. (GW)	% cap. growth	Cap. fac.	Cap. per capita (W)
World	2778.60	8.8	2391.47	27.2	13%	288
China	1174.94	11.1	1202.18	45.6	11%	854
United States	388.82	8.6	211.61	19.2	21%	626
India	195.99	9.4	135.5	37.6	17%	95
Japan	101.06	9.8	92.21	2.9	13%	752
Germany	89.62	17.9	106.27	16.5	10%	1,265
Brazil	88.64	11.8	64.69	21.8	16%	292
Spain	62.92	21.9	47.21	23.7	15%	997
Australia	56.42	19.7	41.07	14.1	16%	1,494
Italy	44.63	16.9	41.19	16.2	12%	676
South Korea	37.80	6.1	30.35	13.8	14%	589
Turkey	37.25	10.5	25.47	25.9	17%	301
Pakistan	36.61	20.7	3.72	0.0		14
France	32.01	5.6	31.23	22.7	12%	456
Netherlands	28.50	21.1	25.88	4.5	13%	1,471
Mexico	26.34	7.4	12.93	7.8	23%	98
Vietnam	23.07	7.4	19.25	3.1	14%	180
Chile	22.18	25.1	12.14	10.2	21%	636
Poland	19.55	11.3	25.42	17.0	9%	663
South Africa	19.48	8.0	11.26	24.3	20%	184
United Kingdom	19.32	6.6	21.66	14.0	10%	315
Taiwan	16.14	5.6	15.47	8.3	12%	655
United Arab Emirates (2024)	15.21	8.6	6.50	9.4	27%	655
Israel	13.28	16.2	7.36	31.2	21%	770
Greece	11.46	19.8	11.08	25.5	12%	1063
Hungary	10.98	27.3	8.18	14.1	15%	832
Belgium	10.46	15.6	10.40	17.9	11%	870
Austria	10.31	14.1	10.30	15.7	11%	1123
Canada	10.17	1.6	5.93	1.9	20%	151
Thailand	9.98	5.3	6.84	101.8	17%	98
Portugal	8.86	17.3	6.95	19.6	15%	682
Saudi Arabia (2024)	8.23	1.8	6.20	154.1	15%	167
Switzerland	7.89	12.1	9.11	17.4	10%	1021
Egypt	7.61	3.1	3.27	28.2	27%	29
Bulgaria	6.91	18.2	5.91	29.6	13%	877
Uzbekistan	6.50	7.5	5.93	95.9	13%	160
Argentina	5.14	3.4	2.59	48.9	23%	57
Romania	4.87	9.8	6.24	46.5	9%	347
Denmark	4.61	13.4	5.05	28.2	10%	835
Colombia	4.60	5.1	1.73	21.8	30%	35
Malaysia	4.51	2.2	3.07	0.0	17%	88
Sweden	4.43	2.6	5.50	13.4	9%	517
Czech Republic	4.39	5.8	4.54	14.1	11%	419
Jordan (2024)	3.93	16.6	2.20	10.6	20%	419
Sri Lanka	3.03	17.6	2.51	58.9	14%	114
Philippines	3.00	2.4	3.89	30.1	9%	34
Russia	2.84	0.2	2.43	7.5	13%	17
Morocco	2.58	5.8	1.09	14.7	27%	29
DR Congo (2024)	2.51	15.8	0.03	50.0		0
Oman	2.30	4.4	1.67	149.3	16%	421
Dominican Republic	2.25	9.9	2.08	46.5	12%	191
North Macedonia	2.21	31.1	1.06	21.8	24%	496
Qatar	2.15	3.8	1.68	107.4	15%	654
Kazakhstan	2.04	1.7	1.33	8.1	18%	65
Cambodia	1.89	10.6	1.48	52.6	15%	86
Peru	1.83	3.0	1.02	92.5	20%	31
Lithuania	1.67	18.8	3.30	27.9	6%	1172
Singapore	1.64	2.7	1.52	25.6	12%	250
Lebanon (2024)	1.60	30.0	1.08	0.0	17%	189
Bangladesh	1.56	1.5	1.15	35.3	15%	7
Slovenia	1.54	10.4	1.57	10.6	11%	728
Ireland	1.49	4.8	2.49	67.1	7%	472
Cyprus	1.37	23.2	0.86	14.7	18%	646
Indonesia (2024)	1.35	0.4	0.94	49.2	16%	3
El Salvador	1.33	20.6	0.74	0.0	21%	117
Croatia	1.29	8.8	1.32	46.7	11%	324
Estonia	1.22	19.7	0.98	11.4	14%	731
Honduras (2024)	1.18	9.5	0.55	3.8	24%	57
Algeria (2026)	5.0	8.83	2.38	282.88	24%	49.33
Panama (2024)	0.99	7.4	0.74	13.9	15%	163
Finland	0.98	1.2	1.57	28.7	7%	283
Puerto Rico	0.95	4.9	1.36	41.7	8%	427
Iran	0.90	0.2	1.78	128.2	6%	20
Latvia	0.82	13.0	0.92	39.4	10%	487
Armenia	0.73	8.5	0.71	44.9	12%	240
Slovakia	0.70	2.4	1.03	41.1	8%	185
Senegal (2024)	0.68	8.9	0.27	17.4	29%	14
Kenya	0.65	4.6	0.55	0.0	13%	10
Uruguay	0.61	5.1	0.34	0.0	20%	99
Bosnia and Herzegovina	0.59	4.1	0.67	9.8	10%	183
Yemen (2024)	0.59	11.2	0.40	42.9	17%	12
Namibia (2024)	0.58	35.4	0.24	0.0	28%	84
Tunisia	0.56	2.5	0.89	15.6	7%	74
Norway	0.53	0.3	0.90	13.9	7%	162
Luxembourg	0.47	30.5	0.77	40.0	7%	1112
Angola (2024)	0.44	2.8	0.36	16.1	14%	9
Iraq (2024)	0.43	0.3	0.04	0.0		1
Bolivia	0.40	2.9	0.19	5.6	24%	15
Palestine (2024)	0.39	39.4	0.30	15.4	15%	55
New Zealand	0.37	0.9	0.84	44.8	5%	161
Albania (2024)	0.34	4.1	0.72	238.1	5%	262
Malta	0.34	15.5	0.25	4.2	16%	479
Guatemala (2024)	0.28	1.8	0.10	0.0	32%	6
Belarus (2024)	0.26	0.6	0.26	3.6	11%	29
New Caledonia (2024)	0.26	8.3	0.21	0.0	14%	683
Cuba (2024)	0.26	8.3	0.21	0.0	14%	39
Moldova	0.23	7.9	0.71	77.5	4%	198
Hong Kong (2024)	0.23	0.6	0.41	24.2	6%	56
Kuwait	0.21	0.2	0.10	0.0	24%	32
Mongolia	0.21	2.2	0.13	-7.1	18%	37
Ghana (2024)	0.17	0.7	0.19	0.0	10%	5
North Korea (2024)	0.17	0.6	0.14	7.7	14%	5
Mali (2024)	0.17	2.9	0.14	40.0	14%	6
Mauritius (2024)	0.17	5.0	0.16	23.1	12%	122
Uganda (2024)	0.17	2.9	0.10	0.0	19%	2
Zambia (2024)	0.17	0.9	0.19	46.2	10%	9
Serbia	0.16	0.4	0.43	43.3	4%	65
Guam (2024)	0.16	8.6	0.10	0.0	18%	589
Sudan (2024)	0.16	1.1	0.19	0.0	10%	4
Jamaica (2024)	0.15	3.1	0.12	9.1	14%	41
Montenegro	0.14	5.7	0.10	66.7	16%	167
Nigeria	0.13	0.3	0.28	21.7	5%	1
Togo (2024)	0.13	18.3	0.07	0.0	21%	8
Myanmar (2024)	0.12	0.6	0.22	22.2	6%	4
Nepal (2024)	0.12	1.1	0.17	41.7	8%	5
Afghanistan (2024)	0.11	11.1	0.06	20.0	21%	1
Burkina Faso (2024)	0.11	6.5	0.21	16.7	6%	9
Bahrain (2024)	0.10	0.3	0.07	16.7	16%	44
Barbados (2024)	0.10	9.0	0.07	0.0	16%	255
Madagascar (2024)	0.10	4.1	0.06	0.0	19%	2
Syria (2024)	0.10	0.4	1.61	57.8	1%	66

Worldwide CSP capacity since 1984 in MW_{p}

=== Concentrated solar power ===
National CSP capacities in 2024 (MW_{p})
Country	Total	Added
Spain	2,302	0
United States	1,480	0
United Arab Emirates	600	0
China	570	0
Morocco	540	0
South Africa	500	0
India	343	0
Israel	242	0
Chile	114	6
Kuwait	52	0
Saudi Arabia	50	0
Algeria	25	0
Egypt	20	0

== Africa ==
Many African countries receive on average a very high number of days per year of bright sunlight, especially the dry areas, which include the arid deserts (such as the Sahara) and the semi-desert steppes (such as the Sahel). This gives solar power the potential to bring energy to virtually any location in Africa without the need for expensive large-scale grid-level infrastructural developments. The distribution of solar resources across Africa is fairly uniform, with more than 85% of the continent's landscape receiving at least 2,000 kWh/(m^{2} year). A study indicates that a solar generating facility covering just 0.3% of North Africa could supply all of the energy required by the European Union.

=== Algeria ===
Algeria is rapidly advancing its renewable energy agenda, targeting 15,000 megawatts (MW) or the equivalent of 15 gigawatts (GW) of solar power capacity by 2035 to reduce dependence on natural gas there are 45 active solar power projects in Algeria, valued at a combined US$6.1 billion. Algeria currently produces approximately 27,000 MW (27 GW) of electricity, according to ministry data. For 2026, Algeria is to commission Nine Solar Power Plants Totaling 1,480 MW (1.48 GW) by august for the first phase of the program to produce 3,200 MW (3.2 GW) of renewable energy which will also include the Ghar Djebilet solar power station and the Adrar wind farm for the entire program starting with the inauguration of El-Foulia facility in El Oued Province.

Algeria has the highest technical and economical potential for solar power exploitation in the MENA region, with about 170 TWh per year. First industrial scale solar thermal power project has been initiated by inauguration of Hassi R'Mel power station in 2011. This new hybrid power plant combines a 25-megawatt (MW) concentrating solar power array in conjunction with a 130 MW combined cycle gas turbine plant. In addition, Algeria has launched in 2011 a national program to develop renewable energy based on photovoltaics (PV), concentrated solar power (CSP) and wind power, and to promote energy efficiency.

=== Egypt ===
Benban Solar Park is a Photovoltaic power station with a total capacity of 1650 MW nominal power which corresponds to an annual production of approximately 3.8 TWh. It is located in Benban (Aswan Governorate) in the western desert, approximately 650 km south of Cairo and 40 km northwest of Aswan. Benban is currently the 4th largest solar power plant in the world.

=== Ethiopia ===
Ethiopia’s electricity system is dominated by hydropower, but solar is expanding through both mini-grids and planned utility-scale projects. In 2025 - 2026 the government and Ethiopian Electric Utility inaugurated multiple small solar plants (hundreds of kW each) serving off-grid communities, while issuing tenders for utility-scale plants such as the 125 MW Gad II and 100 MW Weranso projects under public-private partnership frameworks. Large Chinese investments announced in 2026 include multi-gigawatt solar and wind portfolios (tens of billions of dollars in potential commitments) aimed at diversifying away from hydro dependence and raising total generation capacity. Solar irradiance averages around 5.2 kWh/m²/day, supporting both rural electrification and future grid-scale deployment.

=== Morocco ===
Solar power in Morocco is enabled by the country having one of the highest rates of solar insolation among other countries— about 3,000 hours per year of sunshine but up to 3,600 hours in the desert. In 2009, Morocco launched a collection of projects under its Solar Energy Plan costing an estimated $9 billion. The plan aims to create 2,000 MW of solar generation capacity by the year 2020. Five solar power stations are to be constructed, including both photovoltaic and concentrated solar power technology. The Moroccan Agency for Solar Energy (MASEN), a public-private venture, has been established to lead the project. The first plant, will be commissioned in 2015, and the entire project in 2020. Once completed, the solar project will provide 38% of Morocco's annual electricity generation.

=== South Africa ===
South Africa had 1329 MW of PV installations and 100 MW of concentrating solar thermal at the end of 2016. It is expected to reach an installed capacity 8,400 MW by 2030, along with 8,400 MW of wind power. The country's insolation greatly exceeds the average values in Europe, Russia, and most of North America.

=== Togo ===
Togo’s first utility-scale solar plant, the Sheikh Mohamed Bin Zayed (Blitta) Solar Power Station in the Centrale Region, was developed by UAE-based AMEA Power (via its subsidiary AMEA Togo Solar). The initial 50 MW phases, financed in part under the IRENA-Abu Dhabi Fund for Development (ADFD) Project Facility (ADFD concessional loan of $15 million), entered commercial operation in June 2021 and became one of the largest solar plants in West Africa.

Subsequent expansion, financed by the Abu Dhabi Exports Office (ADEX, an ADFD agency) with loans totaling approximately AED 128.5 million ($35 million), raised capacity to 70 MW plus 4 MWh of battery energy storage by 2023–2024. Further agreements aim to reach 100 MW + 14 MWh storage, making it the largest solar-plus-storage facility in West Africa. The plant supplies clean electricity to hundreds of thousands of households, supports Togo’s target of 50% renewable electricity by the mid-2020s, reduces CO₂ emissions, and has created hundreds of local jobs.

== Asia ==
=== Armenia ===
Armenia due its geographical and climate properties is well-suited for the solar energy utilization. According to the Ministry of Energy Infrastructure and Natural Resources of Armenia the country is capable of producing 1850 kWh/m^{2} per year. For comparison European countries are capable of around 1000 kWh/m^{2} per year on average. Two main panel types utilized in Armenia are the photovoltaic and thermal solar panels. The country is aiming to invest heavy in the segment of renewable energy, as that arises from the geopolitical situation in the region, where Armenia has tenuous relations with some competitive (due to distance) oil-rich suppliers of the region. Thus, besides the investment in the sector by the state - e.g. providing finance for solar energy utilization for rural areas, Armenia also prepared a suitable legislative base to help attract foreign investments of capital - e.g. the guarantee by the state to buy at least for 15 years the surplus energy that will be produced by the solar plants. The country is aiming to developing its economy sustainably, through increase in the technological potential and productivity.

=== China ===
Benefitting from favorable policies and declining costs of modules, photovoltaic solar installation has grown consistently. In 2023, China added 60% of the world's new capacity.

China is leading the world in solar PV generation, with the total installed capacity exceeding 600 GW by the end of 2023. Since overtaking Germany in 2015, China has been #1 in the world in solar power. China is the world's largest market for both photovoltaics and solar thermal energy. and in the last few years, more than half of the total PV additions came from the country. Solar power in the People's Republic of China is one of the biggest industries and the subsidies by the government have helped in bringing down the cost of solar power, not only in China, but the whole world. China also leads the world in solar water heating with 290 GWth in operation at the end of 2014, accounting for about 70% of the total world capacity. China's goal is to reach 1,300 GW of Solar Capacity by 2050.

=== India ===
Installed solar PV on 31 March
Year	Cumulative Capacity (in MW)
2010	161
2011	461
2012	1,205
2013	2,319
2014	2,632
2015	3,744
2016	6,763
2017	12,289
2018	21,651
2019	28,181
2020	34,627
2021	40,085
2022	56,951

India has the world's third fastest expanding solar power program (next only to China & USA). In the year 2017 alone India added a record 9,255 MW of solar power with another 9,627 MW of solar projects under development. India launched its National Solar Mission in 2010 under the National Action Plan on Climate Change, with plans to generate 20 GW by 2022. This target has been achieved four years ahead of its deadline with India surpassing 20 GW of installed solar capacity in January 2018. In January 2015, Indian Prime Minister Narendra Modi announced an initiative to increase the solar capacity to 100 GW and total renewable power capacity to 175 gigawatts (GW) by 2022. This target is ambitious considering the worldwide installed solar capacity at that time was 177 GW, out of which only 2.5 GW was installed in India.

To reach the goal of 100 GW of installed solar capacity by 2022, Modi's government has set a target to auction at least 77 gigawatts of additional solar power capacity by March 2020. A total of 1.2 GW of solar power is tendered in the first week of 2018 and a solar power tender of 20 GW, world's largest so far, is to be auctioned off in one go in 2018. Several large grid-scale solar parks are in operation, several of which are among the world's largest such as Kurnool Ultra Mega Solar Park with the capacity of 1,000 MW, the Kamuthi Solar Power Project with the capacity of 648 MW, the 345 MW Charanka Solar Park, the 480 MW Bhadla Solar Park with a proposed capacity of 2,255 MW and the Gujarat solar parks with a combined capacity of 605 MW. In July 2017, Indian Railways rolled out trains with rooftop solar to power the lights, fans and displays inside the coaches. Cochin International Airport, seventh busiest in India, is the first one in the world to run entirely on solar power, handling more than 1,000 flights a week. Similarly, the Union Territory of Diu is fully run by solar power.

Solar power was featured in the Modi government's US$2.5 billion SAUBHAGYA scheme, launched in July 2015 to electrify every Indian household by 2019 — involving around 300 million people without electricity. The use of local mini-grids run on solar power would contribute to the "60 percent of new connections expected to be to renewable power", according to a report by the International Energy Agency. The government provides subsidy of up to 90% of the upfront capital cost to install solar-powered water pumping systems for irrigation and drinking water.^{[32]} As of 30 November 2017, more than 142,000 solar pumps have been installed to irrigate the agricultural fields.^{[33]} This scheme weans farmers away from diesel-powered pumps and generates extra income for them by allowing to sell surplus power to the grid. The solar panels are being built over the irrigation canals to preserve water from evaporation in drought-prone sunny areas. The world's first canal-top solar project was set up on Narmada in Gujarat in 2012. For the last-mile connectivity in remote and inaccessible areas, the government provides solar power packs of 200 to 300 watt-peak (Wp), along with battery banks that includes five LED lights, one DC fan and one DC power plug.^{[34]} Other schemes include the Solar Street Light Scheme, providing solar direct current lighting systems, solar lanterns, solar cookers, etc.

In January 2016, the Prime Minister of India, Narendra Modi, and the former President of France, François Hollande, laid the foundation stone for the headquarters of the International Solar Alliance (ISA) in Gwalpahari, India, an alliance of 121 countries, announced at the Paris COP21 climate summit. The ISA focuses on promoting and developing solar energy and reducing production and development costs through wider deployment of solar technologies in the developing world. On 30 June 2016, the alliance entered into a partnership with the World Bank for accelerating mobilization of finance for solar energy — an estimated US$1000 billion in investments that will be needed by 2030, to meet ISA's goals for the massive deployment of affordable solar energy worldwide.

At the World Future Energy Summit (WFES) held in Abu Dhabi in January 2018, the government of India announced the setting up of a $350 million solar development fund to enable financing of solar projects. Prime Minister Narendra Modi promoted solar energy during the plenary speech at World Economic Forum annual meet in Davos in 2018 and invited investments in the sector in India promising ease of doing business. Modi's ambitious plan when announced in the leading up to the Paris COP21 climate summit received much skepticism and the government's strategy to scale-up the renewable energy by relying on competitive bidding to reduce the cost was regarded as infeasible. However, starting around 2016–2017, new renewable energy became cheaper to build than running existing coal-fired plants in India. As of January 2018, 65% of coal power generation in India is being sold at higher rates than new renewable energy bids in competitive power auctions. India has scrapped tenders for coal-fired power stations and around 80% of new coal-fired power plants under planning have been halted or canceled. In the month of May 2017 alone, plans for building coal power for nearly 14 GW – about the same as the total amount in the UK – were canceled on account of declining solar costs. Analyst Tim Buckley said "Measures taken by the Indian Government to improve energy efficiency coupled with ambitious renewable energy targets and the plummeting cost of solar has had an impact on existing as well as proposed coal fired power plants, rendering an increasing number as financially unviable. India's solar tariffs have literally been free falling in recent months." As reported by NYTimes in May 2017, "According to research released last week at a United Nations climate meeting in Germany, China and India should easily exceed the targets they set for themselves in the 2015 Paris Agreement..... India is now expected to obtain 40 percent of its electricity from non-fossil fuel sources by 2022, eight years ahead of schedule."

According to IRENA report, India added >37 GW of solar in 2025 - surpassing the United States for the first time in annual additions - to reach ~135.5 GW cumulative.

=== Japan ===
Solar power in Japan has been expanding since the late 1990s. By the end of 2017, cumulative installed PV capacity reached over 50 GW with nearly 8 GW installed in the year 2017. The country is a leading manufacturer of solar panels and is in the top 4 ranking for countries with the most solar PV installed. Overall installed capacity is now estimated to be sufficient to supply 2.5% of the nation's annual electricity demand. The insolation is good at about 4.3 to 4.8 kWh/(m^{2}·day).

Japan was the world's second largest market for solar PV growth in 2013 and 2014, adding a record 6.9 GW and 9.6 GW of nominal nameplate capacity, respectively.

=== Nepal ===
Nepal gets most of its electricity from hydropower sources, but it is looking to expand the role of solar power in its energy mix. The average global solar radiation in Nepal varies from 3.6 to 6.2 kWh/m^{2}/day, sun shines for about 300 days a year, the number of sunshine hours amounts almost 2100 hours per year with an average of 6.8 hours of sunshine each day and average insolation intensity about 4.7 kWhm²/day. The commercial potential for a solar power grid is about 2100 MW.

Power cuts with an average of 10 hours per day in the past time had been common in Nepal and Nepal Electricity Authority used to publish a time table for power cuts. Solar energy can be seen as a more reliable source of energy in Nepal than the traditional electricity. Private installations of solar panels are more frequent in Nepal.

The People living in places such as Madi, Chitwan, where the Electricity Authority does not provide electricity because of Chitwan National Park, have been relying on solar power for several years.

In 2015, the World Bank agreed to invest 130 million dollars into the development of a 25 MW solar power plant. They plan to connect it to the national power grid in the future. Construction of the plant began in April 2018 in the Nuwakot district. The project will serve the Kathmandu Valley upon completion. Upon completion, it will be the largest renewable energy project in the country.

In 2019, Nepal's Department of Electricity Development approved survey licenses for 21 locations to prepare for the possible installation of 56 solar plants, which could have a combined solar capacity of 317.14 MW. The largest planned solar energy project is a 120 MW solar PV station in Dhalkebar in Dhanusha district.

=== Pakistan ===
Pakistan has set up a solar power park, funded by the Chinese company TBEA, in the Cholistan desert near Yazman, about 30 kilometers from the eastern city of Bahawalpur. The solar project, which is set up on 5,000 acres, is producing 100 MW . Another Chinese company, Zonergy has installed a Solar Power Plant with capacity of 900 MW in the same region.

The first unit was completed with a cost of 15 billion rupees in a short period of eleven months. The electricity generated by the project was added to the national grid through grid stations and power supply transmission lines. The second phase of the park, consisting of 900 MW, was completed in two years with the help of Chinese Government.

The energy crisis in Pakistan during the decade of 2010 had led to a shortage in electricity, in response the Pakistani people are increasingly turning to solar power to get electricity at homes. The government is targeting to cover 40% of its energy consumption from solar and renewables by 2030. Years 2021 and 2022 saw a huge demand on residential solar systems in Pakistan.

Total capacity for residential homes was estimated at 100 MW by 2020, with further 200 MW installed in 2021 and another 500 MW installed in 2022, for a cumulative installed capacity of approximately 1400 MW at the end of 2023.

=== Philippines ===
In 2019, the Philippines generated a modest 1,246 GWh of solar energy. Given the country's geographic location advantage and the high potential for generating electricity from solar energy, its generation capacity is expected to increase from the current 1.2% of the total 23 GW to at least 3.5% of the total 43 GW generating capacity by 2040.

=== South Korea ===
The Sinan solar power plant is a 24 MW photovoltaic power station in Sinan, Jeollanam-do, South Korea. As of 2009, it is the largest photovoltaic installation in Asia. The project was developed by the German company Conergy and it cost US$150 million. It was built by the Dongyang Engineering & Construction Corporation.

=== Taiwan ===
The government has a long-term plan to make the PV solar capacity become 6.5 GW by 2020 and 20 GW by 2025. To give further incentives, the government has designated solar energy and LED industries as two industries to actively develop in the near future.

=== Thailand ===
In 2015, Thailand has more solar power capacity than all the rest of Southeast Asia combined. Thailand's solar capacity will rise to 2,500-2,800 MW in the end of 2015 from about 1,300 MW in 2014. Thailand aims to increase its solar capacity to 6,000 MW by 2036. That would account for 9% of total electricity generation.

=== Uzbekistan ===
Uzbekistan has emerged as one of Central Asia’s fastest-growing solar markets. IRENA reported cumulative solar PV capacity of approximately 5.93 GW at the end of 2025. In addition, the government’s Solar House net-metering program had installed over 2.5 GW of small-scale (mainly residential and commercial) PV by mid-2026. Total renewable capacity exceeded 10 GW by end-2025, and the country targets 25 GW of combined solar and wind by 2030, with renewables reaching ~54% of generation. Recent investment deals and tenders continue to add multi-gigawatt solar and storage capacity.

== Middle East ==
=== Israel ===
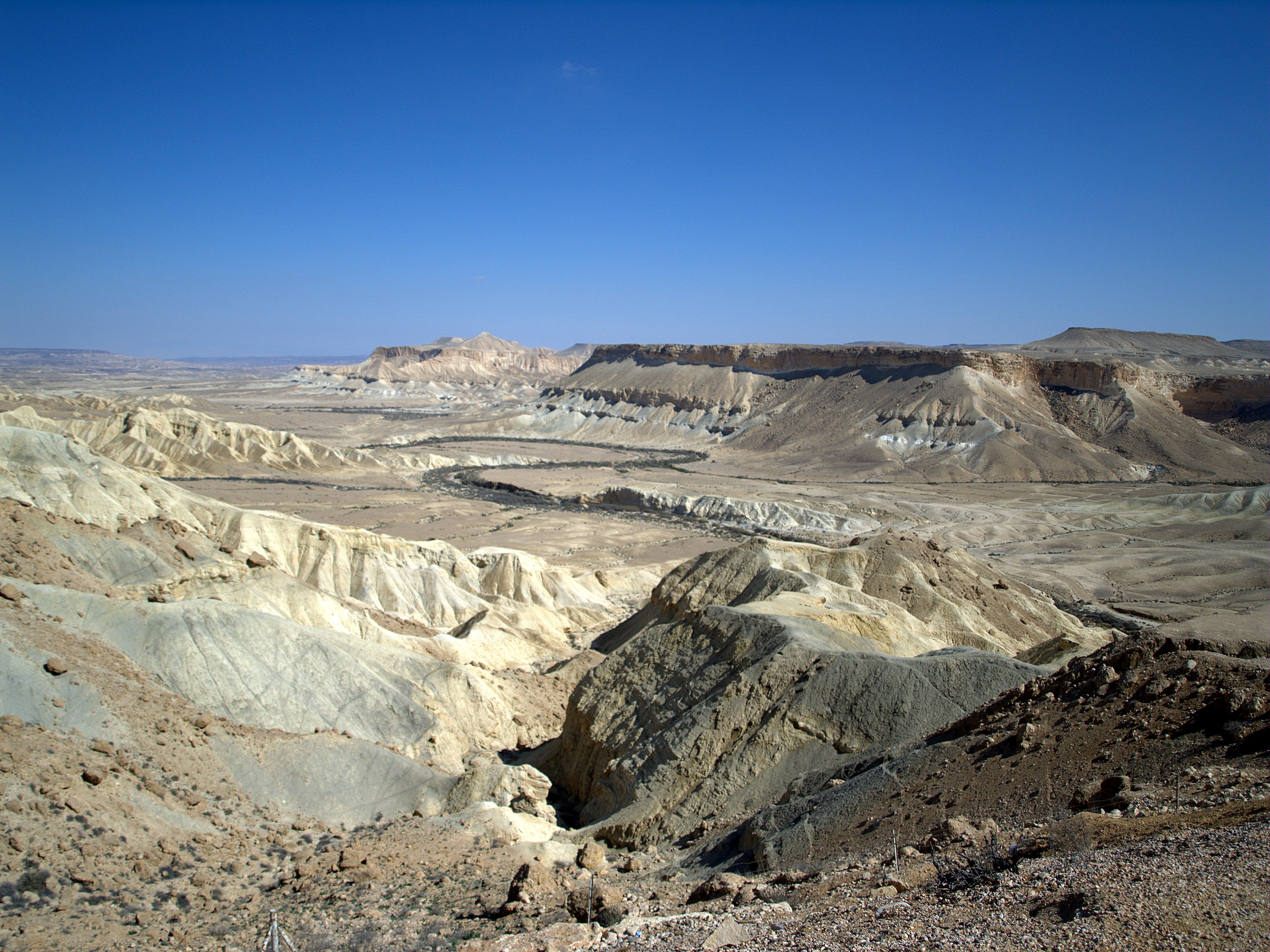
The Negev Desert is home to the Israeli solar research industry, in particular the National Solar Energy Center and the Arava Valley, which is the sunniest area of Israel.

There is no oil on Israeli land and the country's tenuous relations with its oil-rich neighbors has made the search for a stable source of energy a national priority. Israel has consequently embraced solar energy. Israeli innovation and research has advanced solar technology to a degree that it is almost cost-competitive with fossil fuels. Its abundant sun made the country a natural location for the technology. The high amount of sunshine received by the Negev Desert every year has spurred its solar research and development industry, with Arnold Goldman (founder of Luz, Luz II and BrightSource Energy), Harry Tabor and David Faiman of the National Solar Energy Center. At the end of 2008, a feed-in tariff scheme was approved, which immediately put in motion the building of many residential and commercial solar energy power station projects. Luz and Bright Source R&D centers in Jerusalem pioneered industrial scale solar energy fields with initial installations in California's Mojave Desert.

=== Lebanon ===
The ongoing economic crisis in Lebanon has led to a shortage in electricity, in response the Lebanese people are increasingly turning to solar power to provide electricity. The government is targeting to cover 30% of its energy consumption from renewables by 2030. Years 2020 and 2021 saw a huge demand on residential solar systems. No given official numbers yet.

Total capacity was estimated at 90 MW by 2020, with further 100 MW installed in 2021 and another 500 MW installed in 2022, for a cumulative installed capacity of approximately 690 MW at the end of 2022.

=== Oman ===
Oman more than doubled its renewable capacity in 2025, with IRENA data showing total renewables rising 138% to approximately 1.72 GW, driven almost entirely by solar PV (reaching ~1.67 GW). The growth reflects large utility-scale plants such as Ibri II and the Manah projects. Oman Electricity Transmission Company has planned grid integration for over 7 GW of renewables and substantial battery storage through 2029, supporting a target of at least 30% renewables in the power mix by 2030 (with aspirations toward 40%). Peak demand growth and solar variability are being addressed through transmission upgrades and storage.

=== Saudi Arabia ===
The Saudi agency in charge of developing the nations renewable energy sector, Ka-Care, announced in May 2012 that the nation would install 41 gigawatts of solar capacity by 2032, this plan was later revised to 9.5 GW installed capacity. At the time of this announcement, Saudi Arabia had only 0.003 gigawatts of installed solar energy capacity.

In 2018 there has been a proposal for a total of 200 GW of solar power capacity by 2030. The newly announced project is estimated to cost $200 billion through 2030.

=== Turkey ===
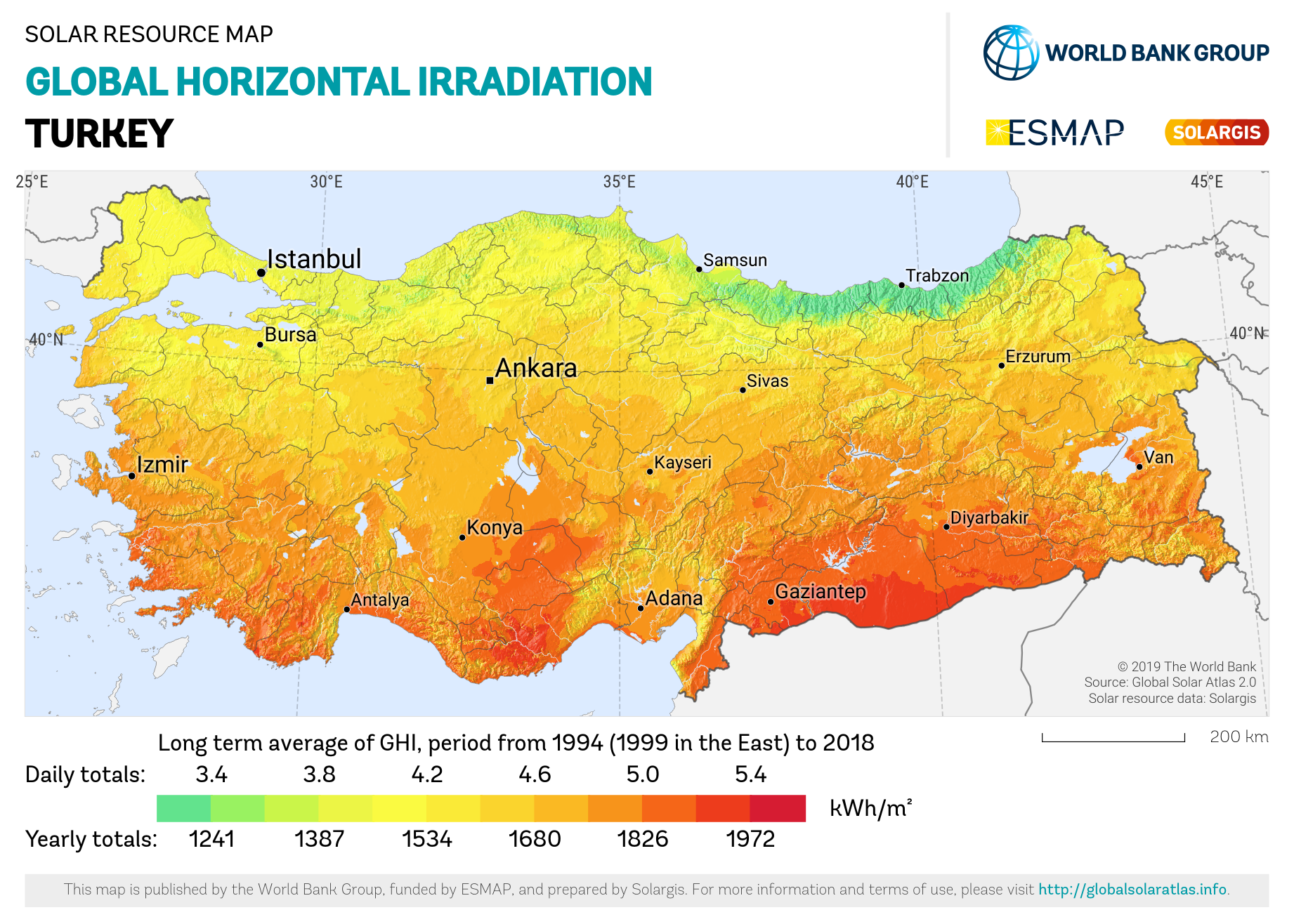
Solar irradiation map of Turkey

Solar power suits Turkey's climate, especially in the South Eastern Anatolia and Mediterranean regions. Solar power is a growing part of renewable energy in the country, with almost 25 gigawatts (GW) of solar panels in 2025, of which 22 GW is commercial and industry rather than traditional power companies or residential rooftop solar as in many other countries. It generates 6% of the country's electricity. Solar thermal is also important.

Despite its similar suitability to solar power, Turkey has installed far less solar power than Spain. Solar power is the cheapest source of power and subsidizes coal and fossil gas power. Every gigawatt of solar power installed would save over US$100 million on gas import costs, and more of the country's electricity might be exported.

Most new solar power is tendered as part of hybrid power plants. Building new solar power plants would be cheaper than running existing import-dependent coal plants if they were not subsidized. However, think tank Ember has listed several obstacles to building utility-scale solar plants, such as insufficient new grid capacity for solar power at transformers, a 50 MW cap for any single solar power plant's installed capacity, and large consumers not allowed to sign long-term power purchase agreements for new solar installations. Ember says there is technical potential for 120 GW of rooftop solar, almost 10 times 2023 capacity, which they say could generate 45% of the country's 2022 demand.

=== United Arab Emirates ===
According to the International Renewable Energy Agency (IRENA), the United Arab Emirates’ renewable energy capacity rose 15.4% in 2025 to approximately 7.9 GW, of which solar accounted for about 7.5 GW. This continued a decade of expansion in which renewable capacity increased more than sixty-fold from its 2015 level. Major facilities include the Mohammed bin Rashid Al Maktoum Solar Park in Dubai, which reached 3.86 GW of operational capacity by the end of 2025, and the 2 GW Al Dhafra Solar PV plant in Abu Dhabi.

Clean energy sources (nuclear, solar, wind and waste-to-energy) accounted for 32.4% of electricity generation in 2025, against a national target of 35% by 2031. Additional multi-gigawatt solar projects with energy storage are currently in development.

== Europe ==
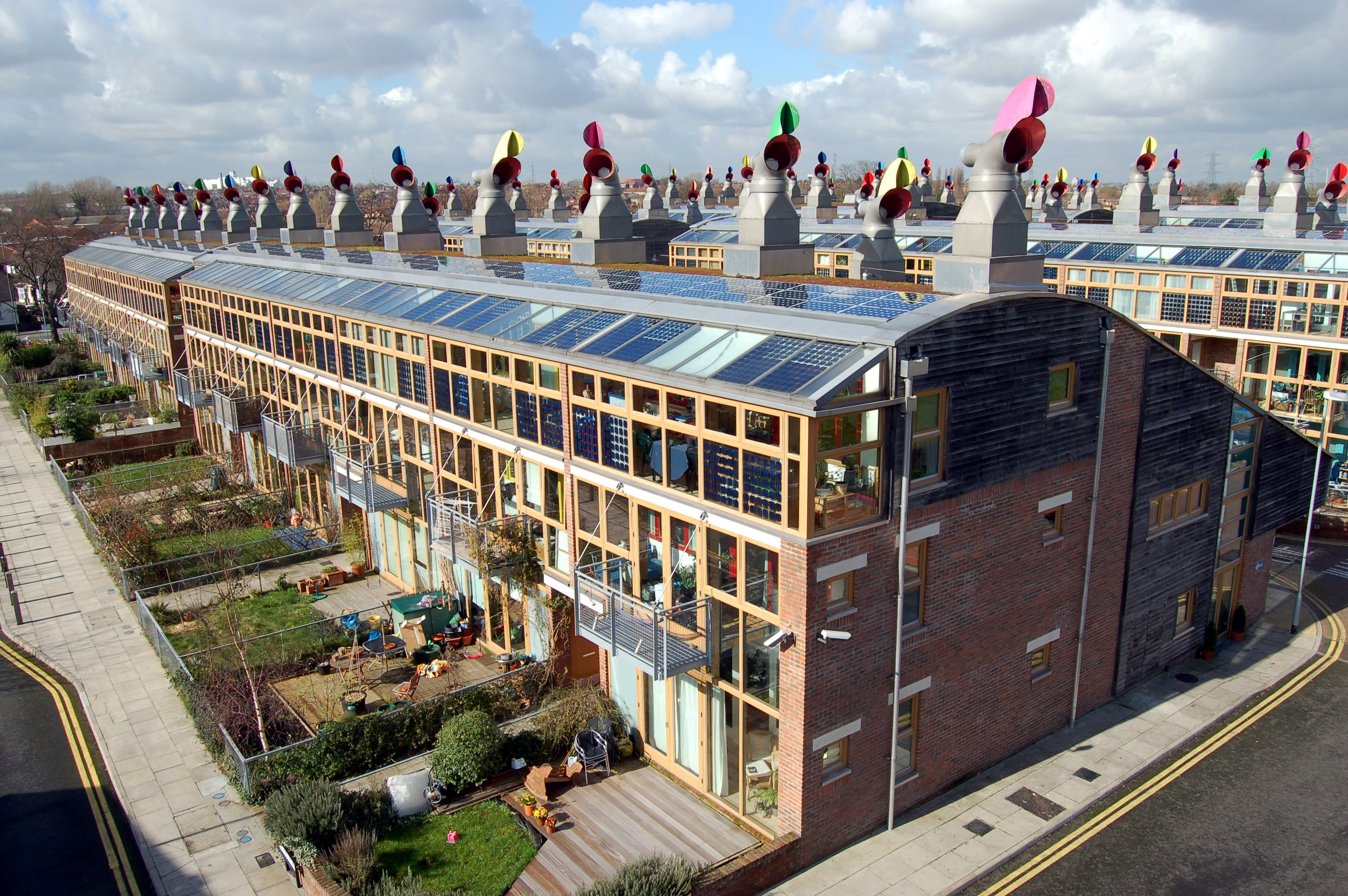
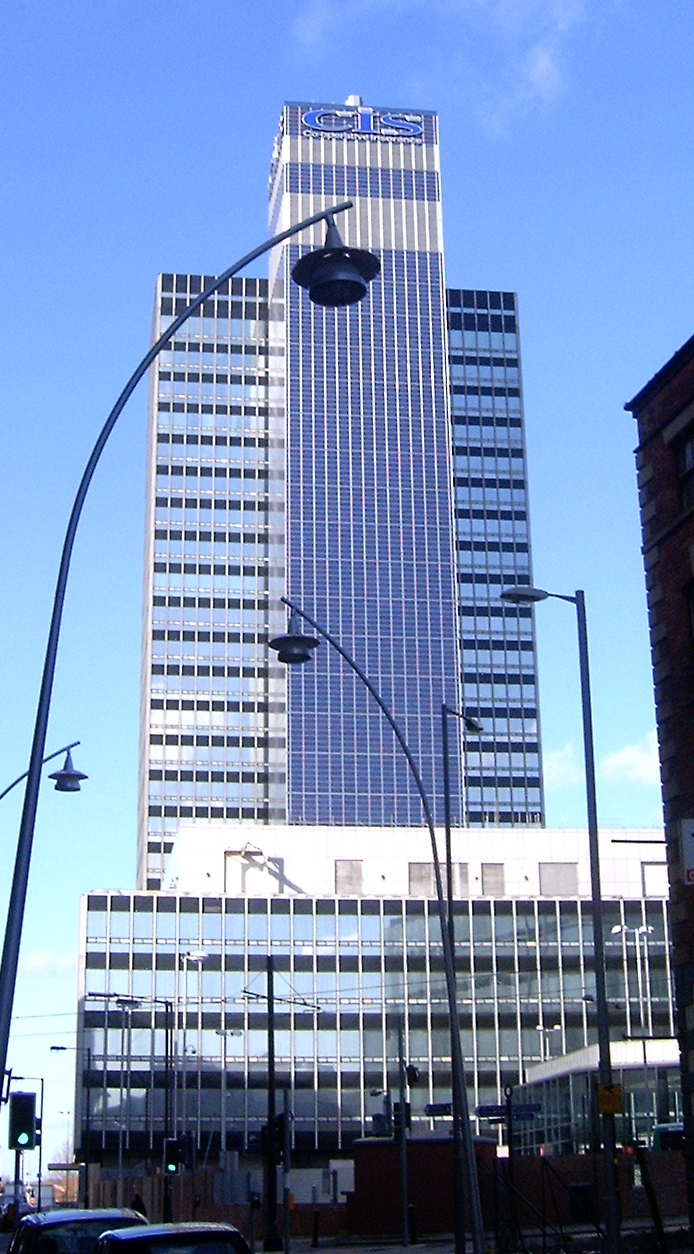
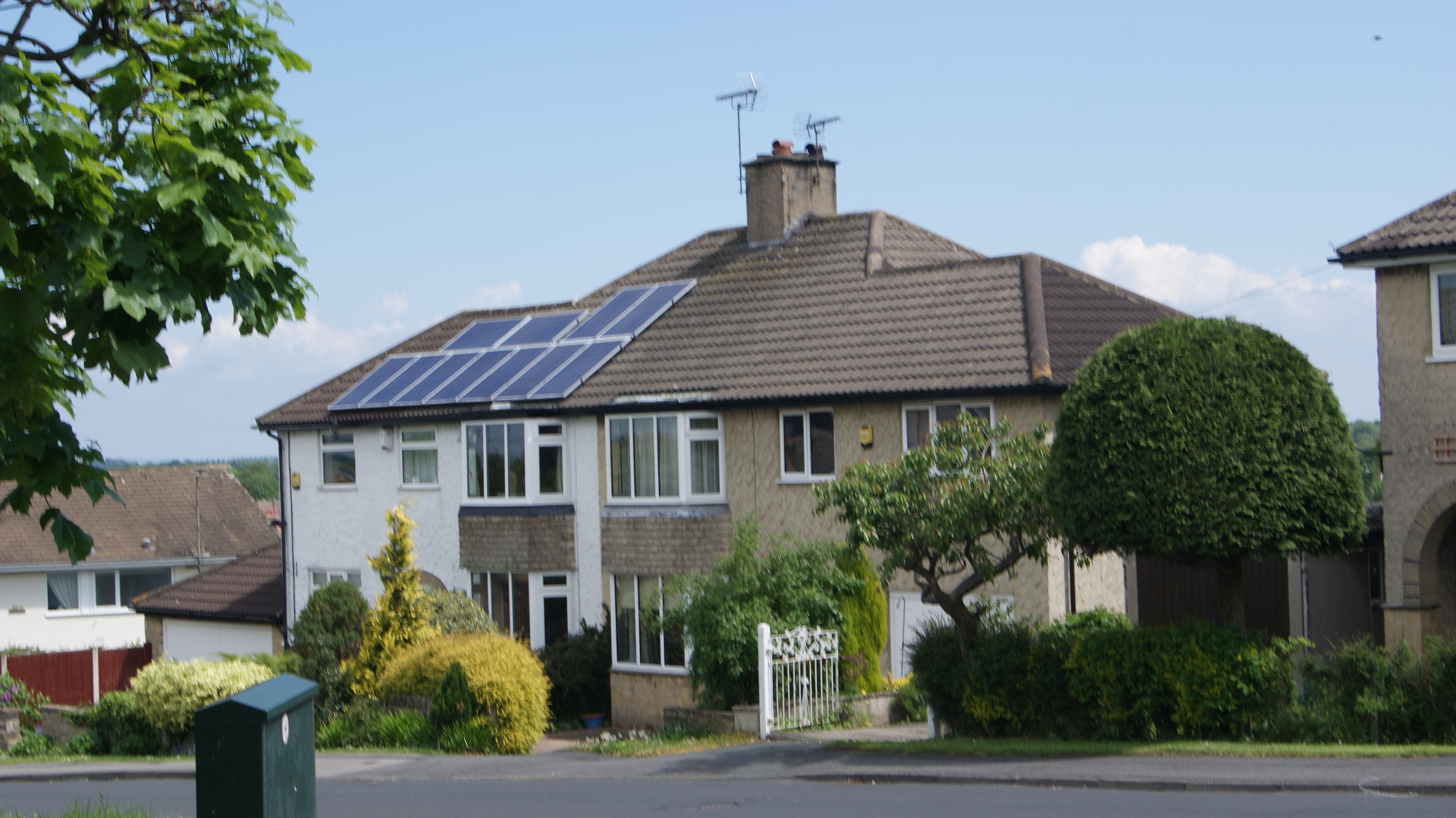
Top-left: solar panels on the BedZED development in the London Borough of Sutton. Bottom: residential rooftop solar PV in Wetherby, Leeds. Top-right: the CIS Tower was clad in building-integrated PV and connected to the grid in 2005.

European deployment of photovoltaics has increased considerably since the year 2010. Cumulative solar PV capacity in the European Union reached over 300 GW in 2024, with industry projections anticipating total capacity more than doubling by 2030, which would take solar power's share in EU electricity generation (9.2% in 2023) over 20%.

Outside of the EU, similar growth in solar power is taking place in the United Kingdom and Switzerland.

=== Austria ===
Austria had 421.7 MW of photovoltaics at the end of 2012, 234.5 MW of which was installed that year. Most of it is grid connected. Photovoltaic deployment in Austria had been rather modest for many years, while in other European countries, such as Germany, Italy or Spain installations were booming with new records year after year until 2011. The tide has turned in 2012. New PV installations jumped to more than 200 megawatts per year in Austria in an overall declining European solar market. The European Photovoltaic Industry Association forecasts, that Austria, together with other midsized countries, will contribute significantly to European PV deployment in the coming years.

=== Belgium ===
In October 2009, the city of Antwerp announced that they wanted to install 2,500 m^{2} of solar panels on the roofs of public buildings, which would be worth 265,000 kWh per annum.

In December 2009, Katoen Natie announced that they would install 800,000 m^{2} of solar panels in various places, including Antwerp. It is expected that the installed solar power in the Flemish region will be increased by 25% when finished, resulting in the largest installation in Europe., the total cost being 166 million euros.

=== Bulgaria ===
Bulgaria had seen a record year in 2012 when its PV capacity multiplied several times over to more than 1 GW. In 2013, however, further deployment came to a halt.

=== Germany ===
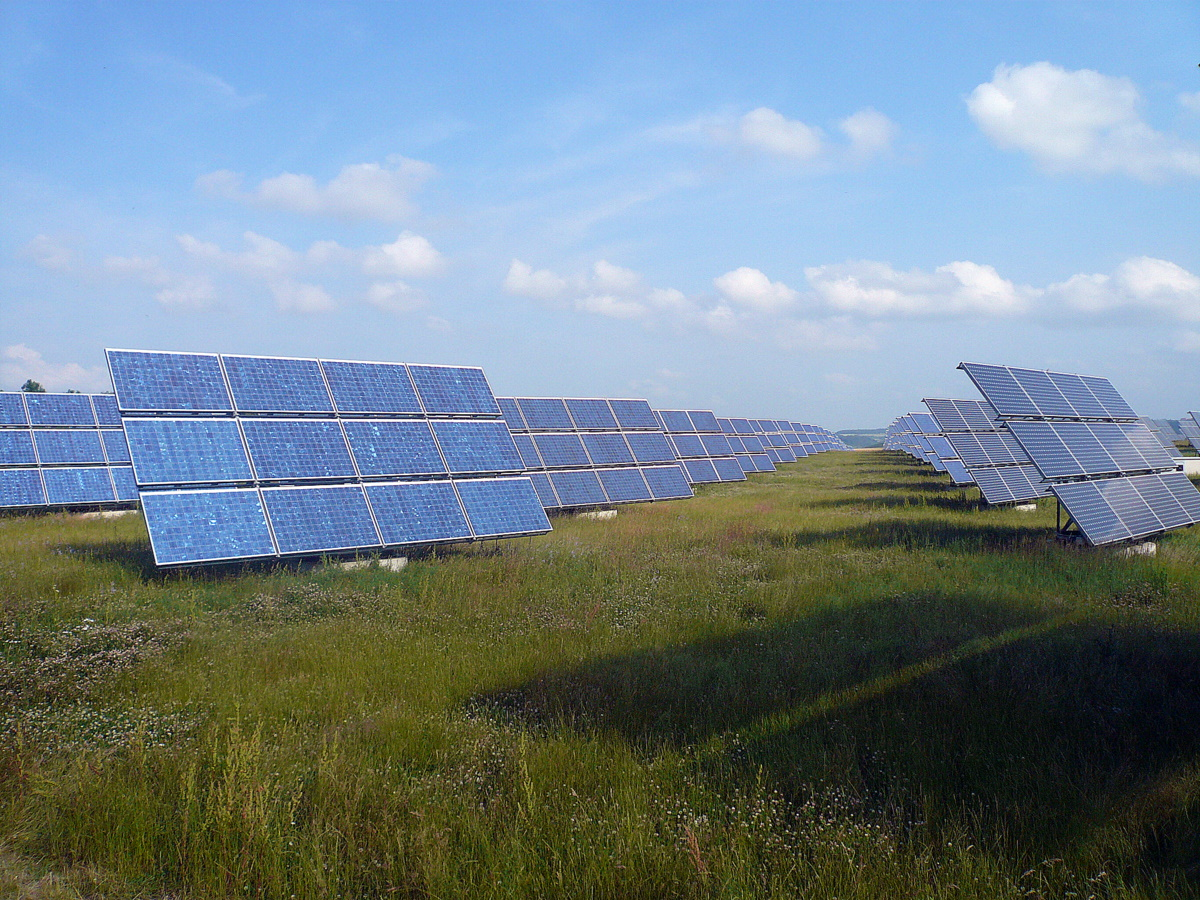
Erlasee Solar Park

Germany is among the top-4 ranked countries in terms of installed photovoltaic solar capacity. The overall capacity has reached 90 gigawatts (GW) by the end of 2024. Photovoltaics contribute more than 14% to the national electricity demands. Germany has seen an outstanding period of photovoltaic installations from 2010 until 2012. During this boom, about 22 GW, or a third of the worldwide PV installations of that period was deployed in Germany alone. However, the boom period ended in 2012, and Germany's national PV market has since declined significantly, due to the amendments in the German Renewable Energy Act (EEG) that reduced feed-in tariffs and set constraints on utility-scaled installations, limiting their size to no more than 10 MW.

The current version of the EEG only guarantees financial assistance as long as the overall PV capacity has not yet reached 52 GW. It also foresees to regulate annual PV growth within a range of 2.5 GW to 3.5 GW by adjusting the guaranteed fees accordingly. The legislative reforms stipulates a 40 to 45 percent share from renewable energy sources by 2025 and a 55 to 60 percent share by 2035.

Large PV power plants in Germany include Senftenberg Solarpark, Finsterwalde Solar Park, Lieberose Photovoltaic Park, Strasskirchen Solar Park, Waldpolenz Solar Park, and Köthen Solar Park.

=== Greece ===
By September 2013, the total installed photovoltaic capacity in Greece had reached 2,523.5 MWp from which the 987.2 MWp were installed in the period between January–September 2013 despite the unprecedented financial crisis. Greece ranks fifth worldwide with regard to per capita installed PV capacity. It is expected that PV produced energy will cover up to 7% of the country's electricity demand in 2014.

A large solar PV plant is planned for the island of Crete. Research continues into ways to make the actual solar collecting cells less expensive and more efficient. Smaller solar PV farms exist throughout the country.

=== Italy ===
Italy added nearly 400 MW of solar PV capacity in the year 2017 reaching a total installed PV capacity of around 19.7 GW.

At the end of 2010 there were 155,977 solar PV plants, with a total capacity of 3,469.9 MW. The number of plants and the total capacity surged in 2009 and 2010 following high incentives from Conto Energia. The total power capacity installed tripled and plants installed doubled in 2010 compared to 2009, with an increase of plant's average dimensions.

Energy production from photovoltaics was 1,905.7 GWh in 2010. Annual growth rates were fast in recent years: 251% in 2009 and 182% in 2010. More than a fifth of the total production in 2010 came from the southern region of Apulia.

In December 2012, solar PV in Italy provided employment to 100,000 people especially in design and installation.

=== Portugal ===
A large photovoltaic power project, the Serpa solar power plant, has been completed in Portugal, in one of Europe's sunniest areas. The 11-megawatt plant covers 150 acres (0.61 km^{2}) and comprises 52,000 PV panels. The panels are raised 2 metres off the ground and the area will remain productive grazing land. The project will provide enough energy for 8,000 homes and will save an estimated 30,000 tonnes of carbon dioxide emissions per year.

The Moura photovoltaic power station is located in the municipality of Moura, in the interior region of Alentejo, Portugal. Its construction involves two stages, with the first one being constructed in 13 months and completed in 2008, and the other will be completed by 2010, at a total cost of €250 million for the project.

=== Romania ===
Romania has an installed capacity of 1.2 GW as of 2014. Romania is located in an area with a good solar potential of 210 sunny days per year and with an annual solar energy flux between 1,000 kWh/m2/year and 1,300 kWh/m2/year. The most important solar regions of Romania are the Black Sea coast, Dobrogea and Oltenia.

=== Russia ===
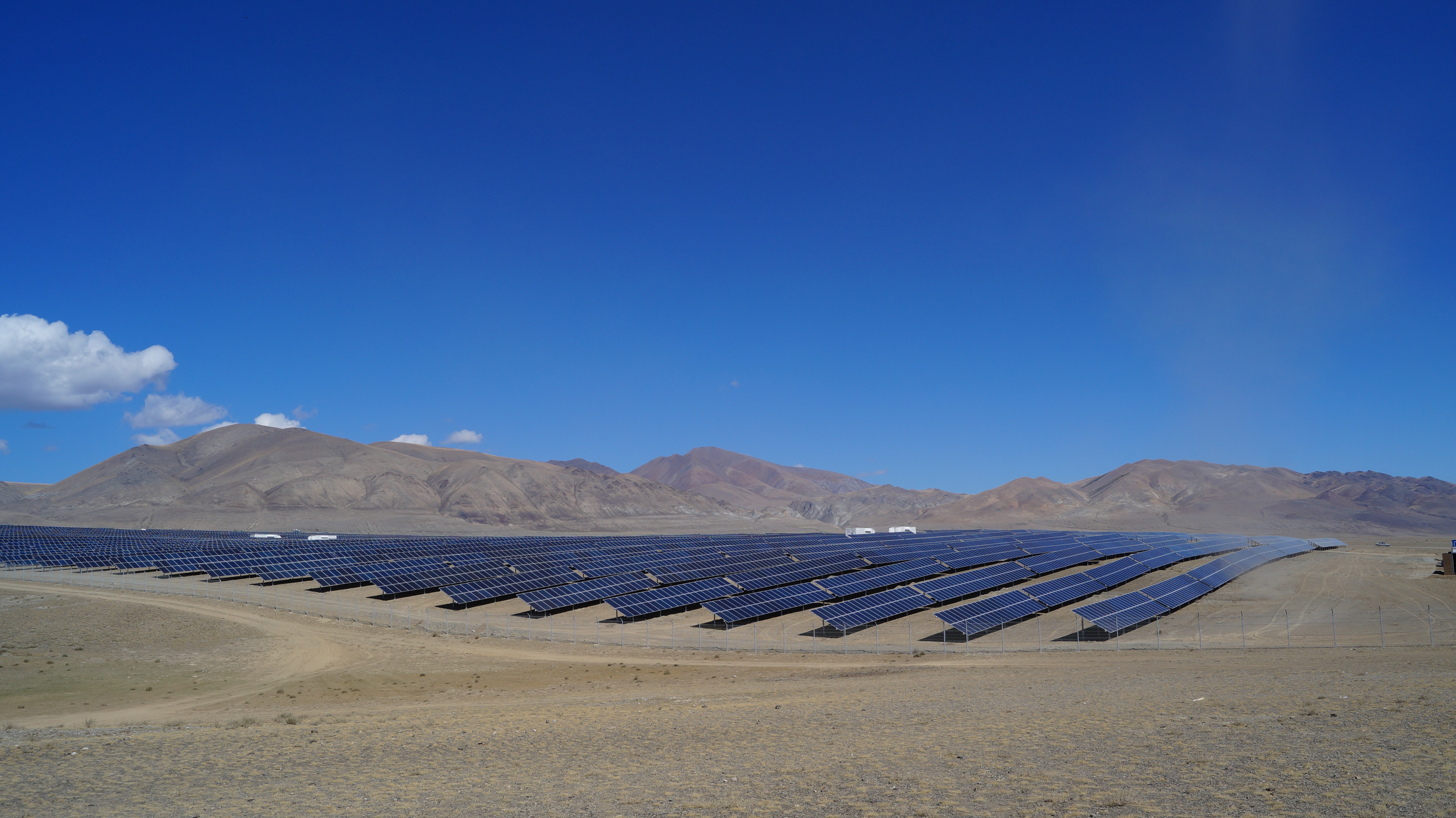
A solar power plant in Russia

Current production of 5 MW is very modest, however there are plans for an expansion in capacity by 70 MW in 2012–13 in a $210 million joint project by Rosnano and Renova. The development of renewable energy in Russia has been held back by the lack of a conducive framework and government policy.

=== Spain ===
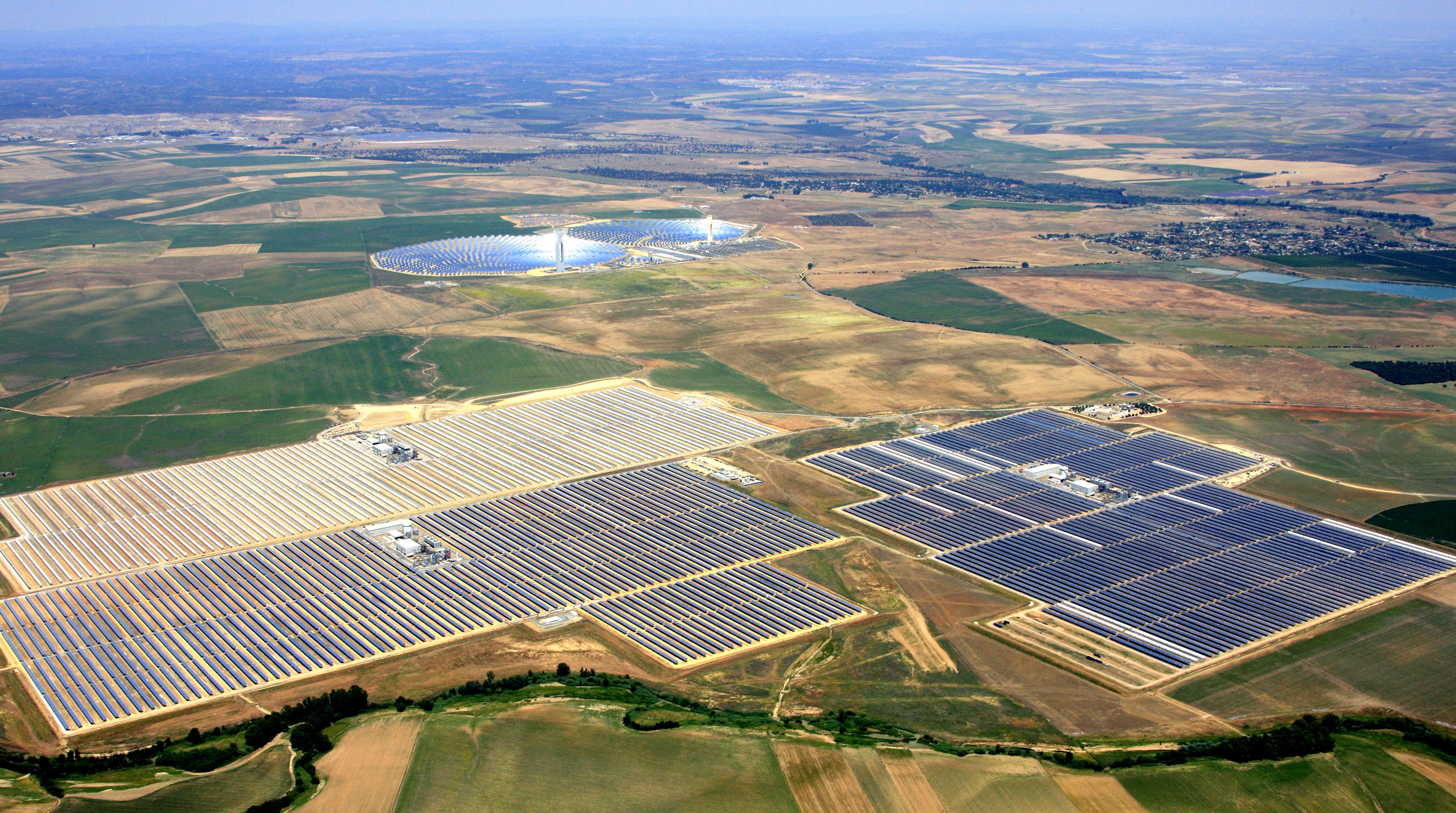
The first three units of Solnova in the foreground, with the two towers of the PS10 and PS20 solar power stations in the background

Spain was an early adopter in the development of solar energy, since it is one of the countries of Europe with more hours of sunshine. The Spanish government committed to achieving a target of 12 percent of primary energy from renewable energy by 2010 with an installed solar generating capacity of 3000 megawatts (MW). Spain is the top tenth in the installed PV solar capacity and used to export 80 percent of solar power output to Germany. Total solar power in Spain reached nearly 7 GW by the end of 2016 including both installed PV and CSP. Nearly 8 TWh of electricity was generated from photovoltaics, and 5 TWh from CSP plants in 2016. Solar PV accounted for nearly 3% of total electricity generation in 2016 along with an additional of 1.9% from solar thermal.

Through a ministerial ruling in March 2004, the Spanish government removed economic barriers to the connection of renewable energy technologies to the electricity grid. The Royal Decree 436/2004 equalized conditions for large-scale solar thermal and photovoltaic plants and guaranteed feed-in tariffs, which led to a boost in solar power adoption in Spain. In the wake of the 2008 financial crisis, the Spanish government drastically cut its subsidies for solar power and capped future increases in capacity at 500 MW per year leading to a stagnation in the new installations.

=== United Kingdom ===
At the end of 2011, there were 230,000 solar power projects in the United Kingdom, with a total installed generating capacity of 750 megawatts (MW). By February 2012 the installed capacity had reached 1,000 MW. Solar power use has increased very rapidly in recent years, albeit from a small base, as a result of reductions in the cost of photovoltaic (PV) panels, and the introduction of a Feed-in tariff (FIT) subsidy in April 2010. In 2012, the government said that 4 million homes across the UK will be powered by the sun within eight years, representing 22,000 MW of installed solar power capacity by 2020. As of April 2015, PV capacity had risen to 6,562 MW across 698,860 installations. The latest government figures indicates UK solar photovoltaic (PV) generation capacity has reached 12,404 MW in December 2017.

== North America ==
=== Canada ===
Sarnia Photovoltaic Power Plant near Sarnia, Ontario, was in September 2010 the world's largest photovoltaic plant with an installed capacity of 80 MW_{p}. until surpassed by a plant in China. The Sarnia plant covers 950 acres (380 ha) and contains about 10.3 million sq feet / 966,000 square metres (96.6 ha), which is about 1.3 million thin film panels. The expected annual energy yield is about 120,000 MW·h, which if produced in a coal-fired plant would require emission of 39,000 tonnes of CO_{2} per year.

Canada has many regions that are sparsely populated and difficult to access, but also does not have optimal access to sunlight given the high latitudes of much of the country. Photovoltaic cells are increasingly used as standalone units, mostly as off-grid distributed electricity generation to power remote homes, telecommunications equipment, oil and pipeline monitoring stations and navigational devices. The Canadian PV market has grown quickly and Canadian companies make solar modules, controls, specialized water pumps, high efficiency refrigerators and solar lighting systems. Ontario has subsidized solar power energy to promote its growth.

One of the most important uses for PV cells is in northern communities, many of which depend on high-cost diesel fuel to generate electricity. Since the 1970s, the federal government and industry has encouraged the development of solar technologies for these communities. Some of these efforts have focused on the use of hybrid systems that provide power 24 hours a day, using solar power when sunlight is available, in combination with another energy source.

=== Dominican Republic ===
In June 2021, the Girasol Solar Park was inaugurated as the largest solar PV farm in the country and the entire Antilles region. It has a total installed capacity of 120 megawatts and it is estimated that it will produce 240,000 MWh per year, enough to supply the electricity consumption of more than 100,000 Dominican homes. Girasol will avoid the emission into the atmosphere of 150,000 tons of CO_{2} annually and the import of 400,000 barrels of oil, which contributes to mitigate the effects of climate change and represents savings in foreign exchange, respectively.

Before this, in the Dominican Republic, the Monte Plata Project was the largest operating solar plant in the Caribbean with an installed capacity of 69 MW.

=== Jamaica ===
In 2014, a 1.6 MW photovoltaic rooftop system at a seaside resort, located near the parish capital, Lucea in the parish of Hanover, was inaugurated. It was developed by Sofos Jamaica, and is the largest in Jamaica until a 20 MW utility-scale solar PV plant is constructed in the Parish of Clarendon in 2015.

No central database yet exists with information on installed capacity but, web searches reveal media articles, press releases and vendor web pages that share some details. Based on these sources up to the middle of 2015, there was over 3.7 MW connected to the grid but, a sizeable portion of that total, including the 1.6 MW rooftop system of a seaside resort and a commercial 500 kW-system in the country's capital, Kingston, do not feed power back to the grid despite being interconnected.

=== Mexico ===
Mexico was the greatest solar energy producer in Latin America before being overtaken by Brazil. Currently, it is the second largest Latin American producer, with an installed capacity of over 9 GW (in 2022).

=== United States ===
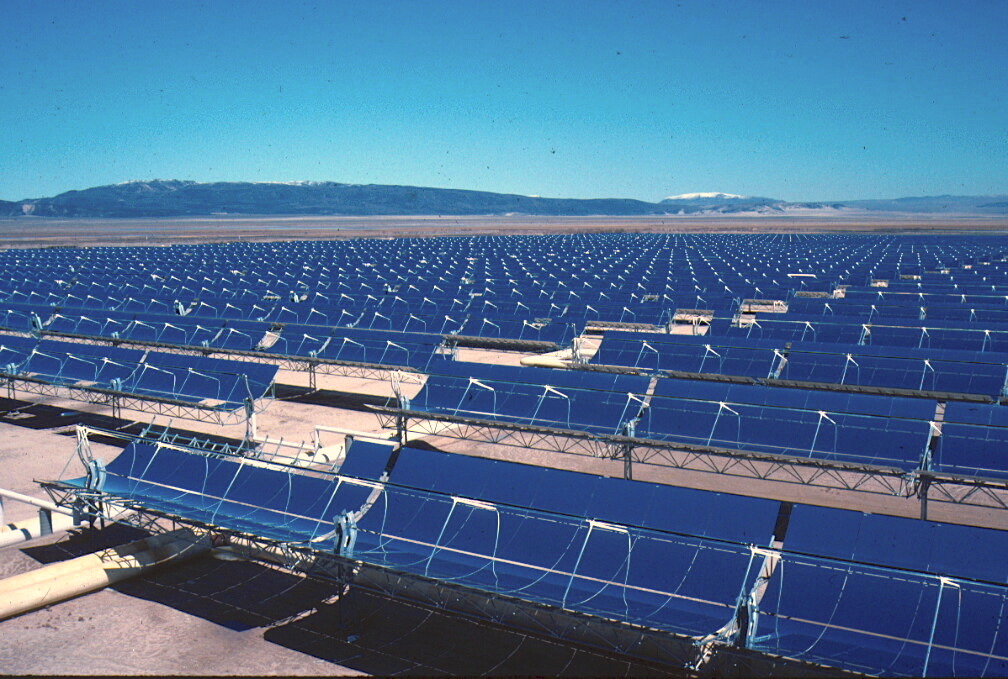
The SEGS CSS plant in San Bernardino County, California was built in the 1980s.

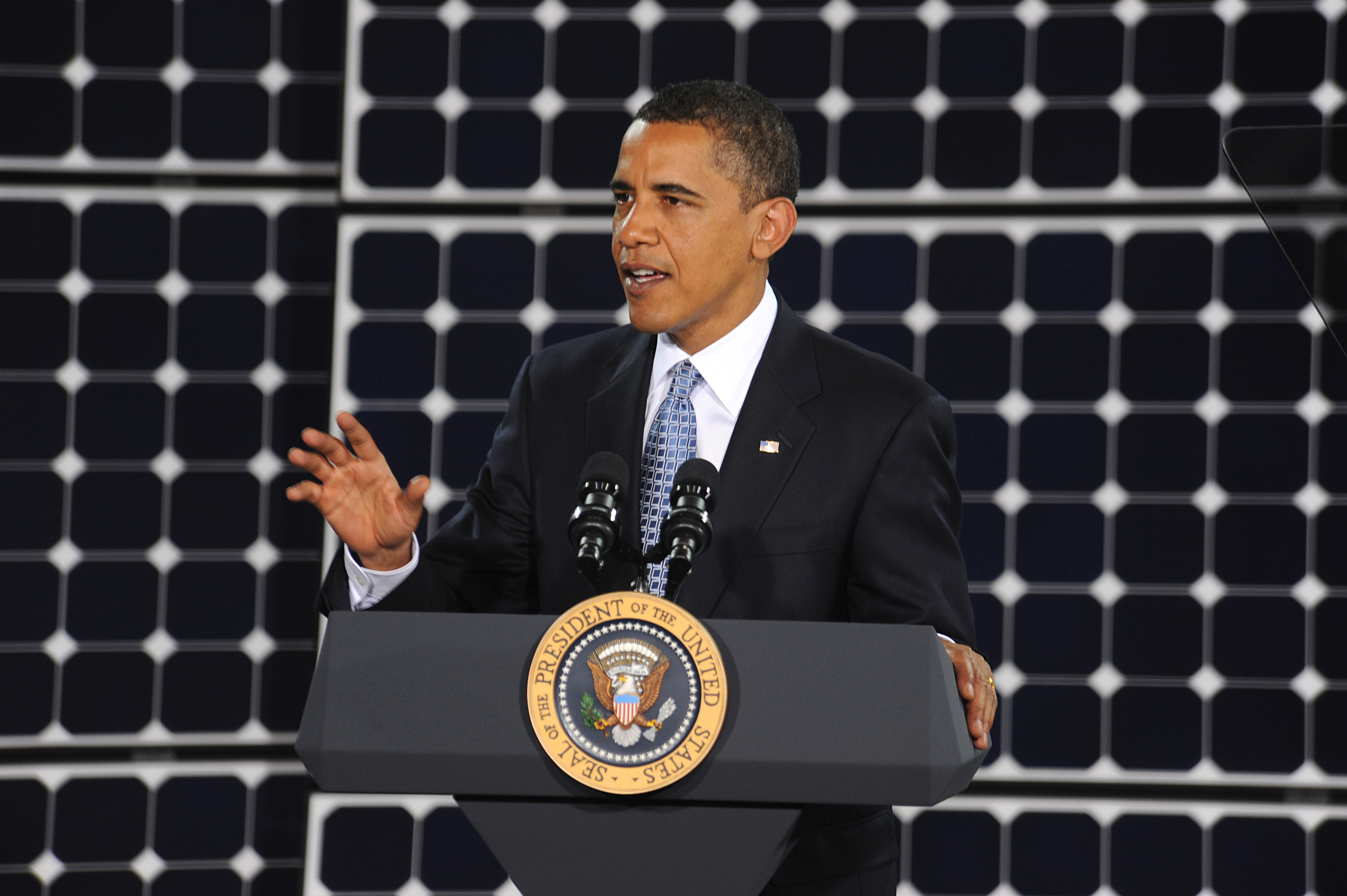
U.S. President Barack Obama addressed an audience at the Nellis in May 2009.

Solar power in the United States includes utility-scale solar power plants as well as local distributed generation, mostly from rooftop photovoltaics. Installations have been growing rapidly in recent years as costs have declined with the U.S. hitting 76 GW of installed solar PV capacity at the end of 2019. The United States is in the top 4 ranking for countries with the most solar PV installed. The American Solar Energy Industries Association projected that total solar PV capacity would reach over 100 GW by 2021.

Electrical generation has been rising in tandem with capacity as U.S. Energy Information Administration data show that utility-scale solar power generated 1.8% of total U.S. electricity in 2019, up from <0.1% in 2005. This figure is even higher in certain states, already reaching over 10% of generation in five states (California, Hawaii, Nevada, Massachusetts, and Vermont).

The United States conducted much early research in photovoltaics and concentrated solar power and is among the top countries in the world in deploying the technology, being home to 4 of the 10 largest utility-scale photovoltaic power stations in the world as of 2017. The energy resource continues to be encouraged through official policy with 29 states having set mandatory renewable energy targets as of October 2015, solar power being specifically included in 20 of them. Aside from utility projects, roughly 784,000 homes and businesses in the nation have installed solar systems through the second quarter of 2015.

== Oceania ==
A number of Pacific island states have committed to high percentages of renewable energy use, both to serve as an example to other countries and to cut the high costs of imported fuels. A number of solar installations have been financed and assisted by Australia, Japan, New Zealand and the United Arab Emirates. Solar farms have gone online in Tuvalu, Fiji and Kiribati. UAE-Pacific Partnership Fund solar projects completed by Masdar in 2016 included: 1 MW in the Solomon Islands, 500 kW in Nauru, 600 kW in the Marshall Islands, 600 kW in Micronesia and a 450 kW solar-diesel hybrid plant in Palau. American Samoa has 2 MW of solar installed at Pago Pago Airport.

=== Australia ===
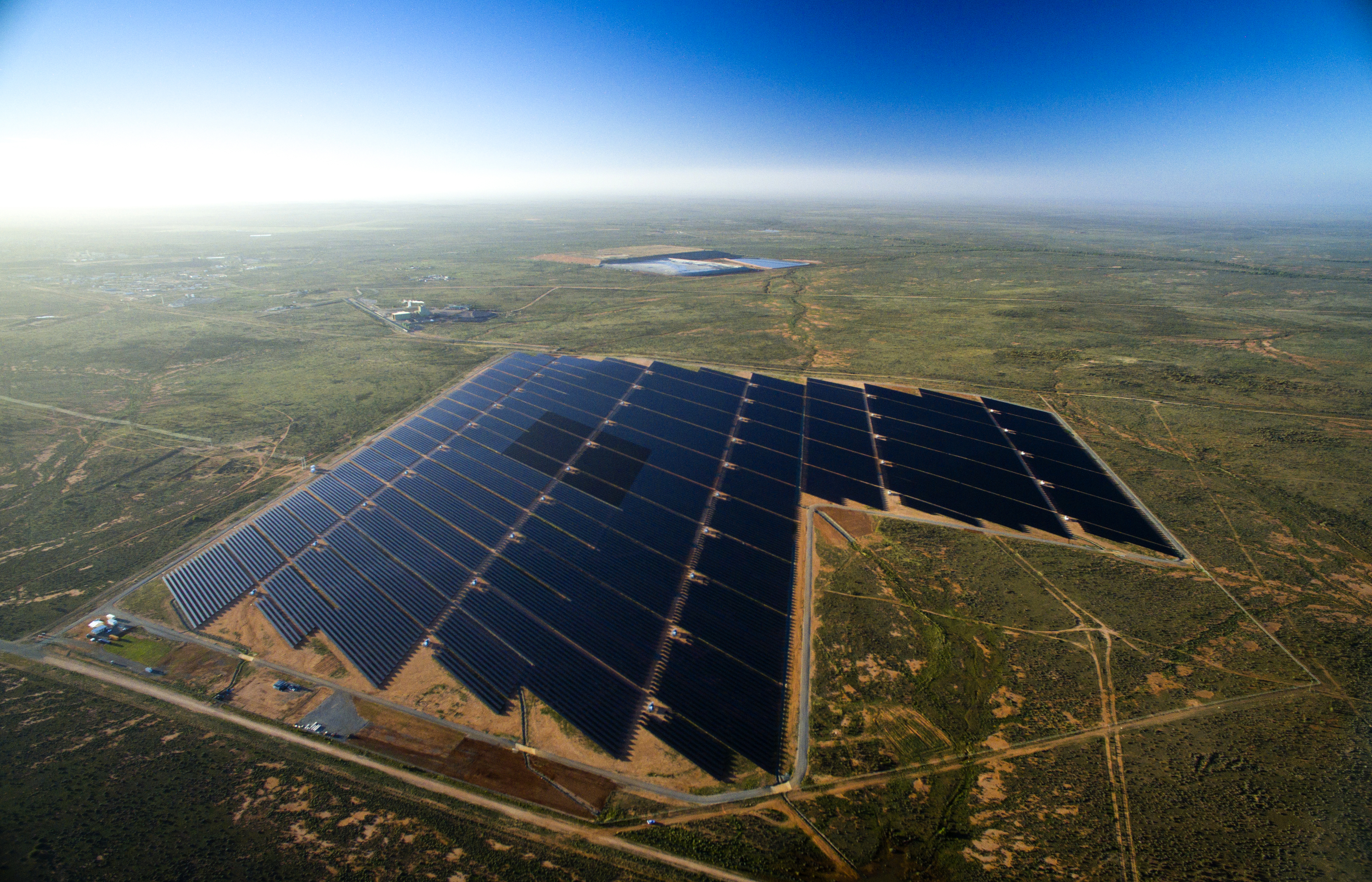
Broken Hill Solar Plant, New South Wales

Australia had over 23,466 megawatts (MW) of installed photovoltaic (PV) solar power by September 2021 making it a leader in solar power deployment on a watts per capita basis. The largest solar power station in Australia is the 313 MW Limondale Solar Farm. Other significant solar arrays include the 275 MW Darlington Point Solar Farm, 220 MW Bungala solar plant, 200 MW Sunraysia Solar Farm and 174 MW Wellington Solar Farm.

A 9 MW_{e} (megawatts, electrical) solar thermal `coal saver' system was constructed at Liddell power station. The system used `compact linear Fresnel reflector' technology developed in Australia. It provided solar-powered steam to the 600 MW black coal power station's boiler feedwater heater. By 2016, it was "effectively" closed and an effort to build a similar 40 MW solar boost at Kogan Creek coal power station was stopped.

The planned Australia–ASEAN Power Link aims to connect Singapore to 26,000 MW of solar and wind energy in the north west of Australia.

=== New Zealand ===
Solar power in New Zealand currently only generates 0.1 percent of New Zealand's electricity since more emphasis has been placed on hydroelectric, geothermal, and wind power in New Zealand's push for renewable energy. Solar power systems were installed in 42 schools in New Zealand in the Schoolgen program, a program developed by Genesis Energy to educate students in solar power. Each participating school has a 2 kW solar panel. Between February 2007 and 29 December 2012, 395.714 MWh were produced.

In 2010, New Zealand's largest thin film solar array was the 20 kW array installed at Hubbard Foods A 21.6 kW photovoltaic array was installed in Queenstown in 2009. In April 2012, New Zealand's largest solar power plant was the 68.4 kW array installed to meet 70% of the electricity needs of South Auckland Forging Engineering Ltd, which is expected to pay for itself in eight to nine years.

== South America ==
=== Argentina ===
Argentina reached a milestone of 1 GW of solar power in 2021.

=== Brazil ===
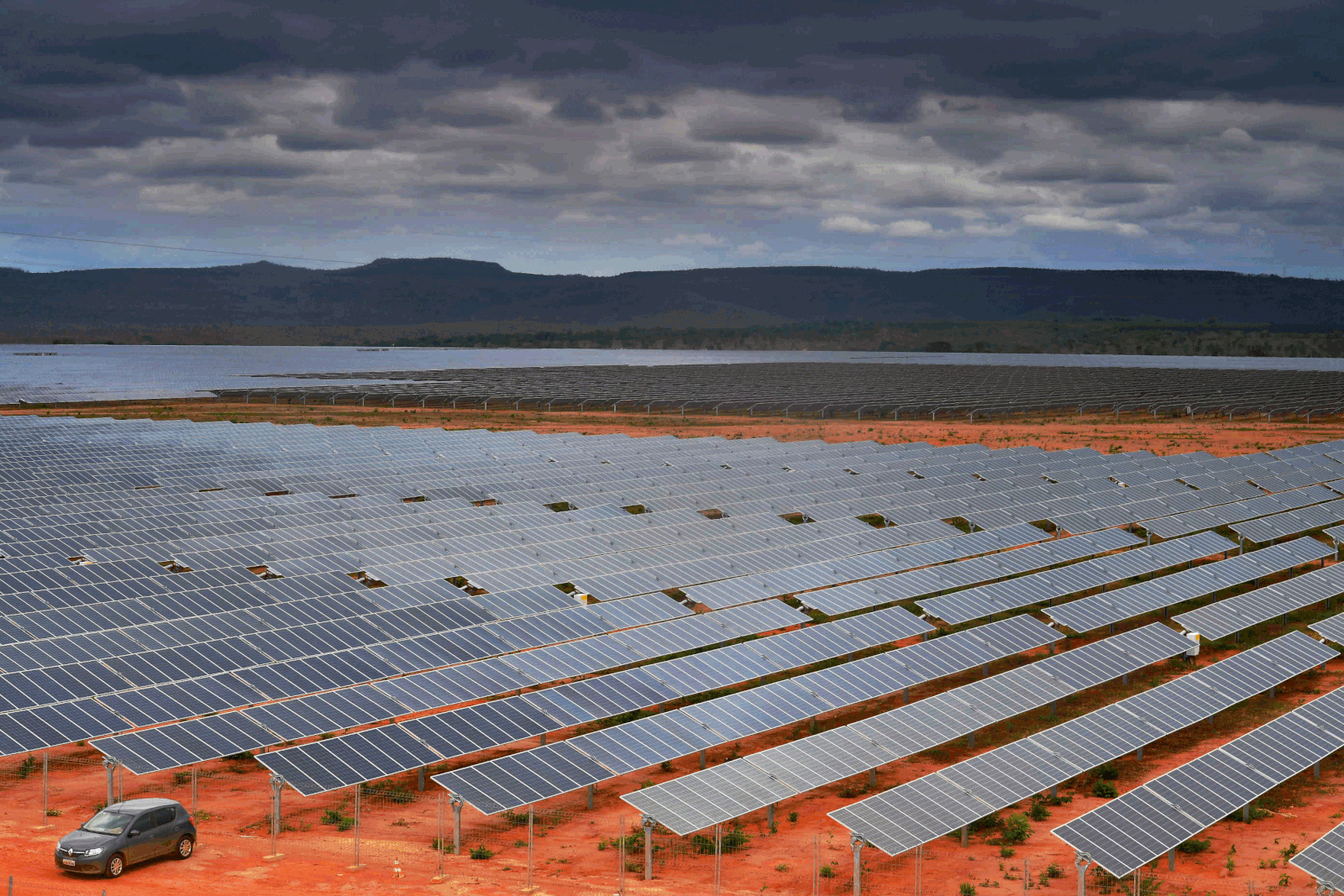
Pirapora Solar Complex, one of the largest in Brazil and Latin America, with a capacity of 321 MW

Brazil began to install solar energy on a massive scale starting in 2017, quickly becoming the Latin American country with the most solar energy installed. The total installed solar power in Brazil was estimated at 21 GW at October 2022, generating approximately 2.48% of the country's electricity demand. In 2023 Brazil will be among the 10 largest countries in the world in terms of installed solar power. In 2020, Brazil was the 14th country in the world in terms of installed solar power (7.8 GW).

In 2022, Brazil entered, for the first time, the list of the ten countries with the highest accumulated installed power from photovoltaic solar source. The country ended 2022 with 24 gigawatts (GW) of solar operating power. With this result, Brazil took eighth place in the international ranking.

=== Chile ===
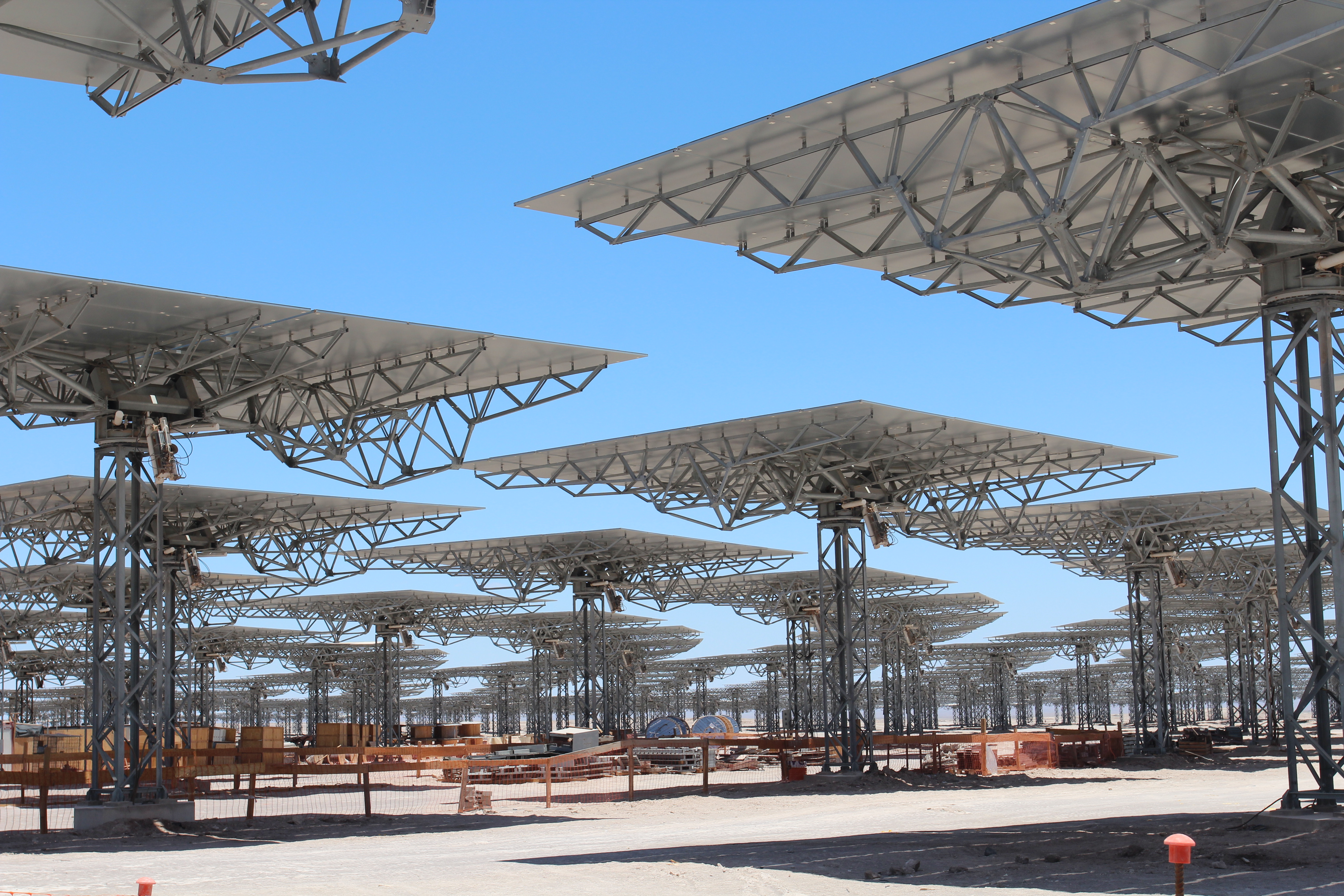
Heliostats at Cerro Dominador Solar Thermal Plant

Chile is currently the third Latin American country (and second in South America) with the most installed solar energy, 4.4 GW in 2021. As the Atacama Desert has the highest solar irradiation in the world, and Chile has always had problems obtaining energy (the country basically does not produce oil, gas and coal), renewable energy is seen as the solution for the country's shortcomings in the energy field.

The 246 MW El Romero solar photovoltaic plant open in November 2016 at Vallenar in the Atacama region It was the largest solar farm in Latin America when it opened.

By the first half of 2015 Chile reached 546 MW of PV installed capacity, and 1,647 MW are under construction.

== See also ==
- Wind power by country
- Growth of photovoltaics
- International Solar Alliance
- List of photovoltaic power stations
- List of solar thermal power stations
- Renewable energy
- Renewable energy commercialization
- Solar energy
- Solar thermal energy
