= Solar power in Brazil =

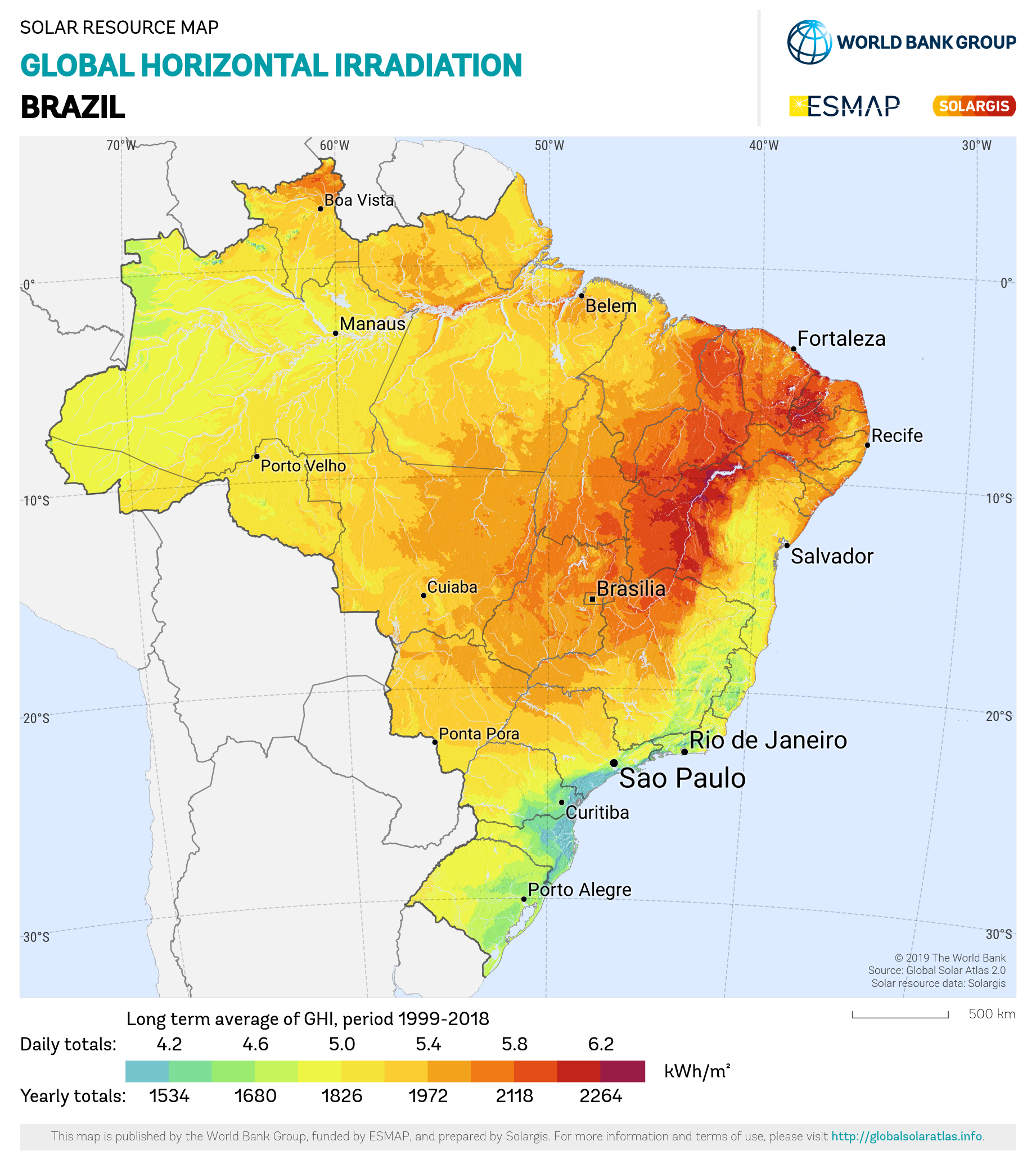
- Solar irradiation map of Brazil
- Installed capacity: 53 GW (2024) (5)
- Annual generation: 74 TWh (2024)
- Capacity per capita: 241 W (2024)
- Share of electricity: 10% (2024)

The total installed solar power in Brazil was estimated at 53.9 GW at February 2025, which consists of about 21.9% of the country's electricity matrix. In 2023, Brazil was the 6th country in the world in terms of installed solar power capacity (37.4 GW).

Brazil expects to have 1.2 million solar power generation systems in the year 2024. Solar energy has great potential in Brazil, with the country having one of the highest levels of insolation in the world at 4.25 to 6.5 sun hours/day. As of 2019, Brazil generated nearly 45% of its energy, or 83% of its electricity, from renewable sources. For example, 60% of Brazil's electricity generation came from renewable hydropower. However, to meet energy demands in the entire country, and to diversify its energy portfolio, other renewable energy sources, such as solar power, are being expanded.

== History ==
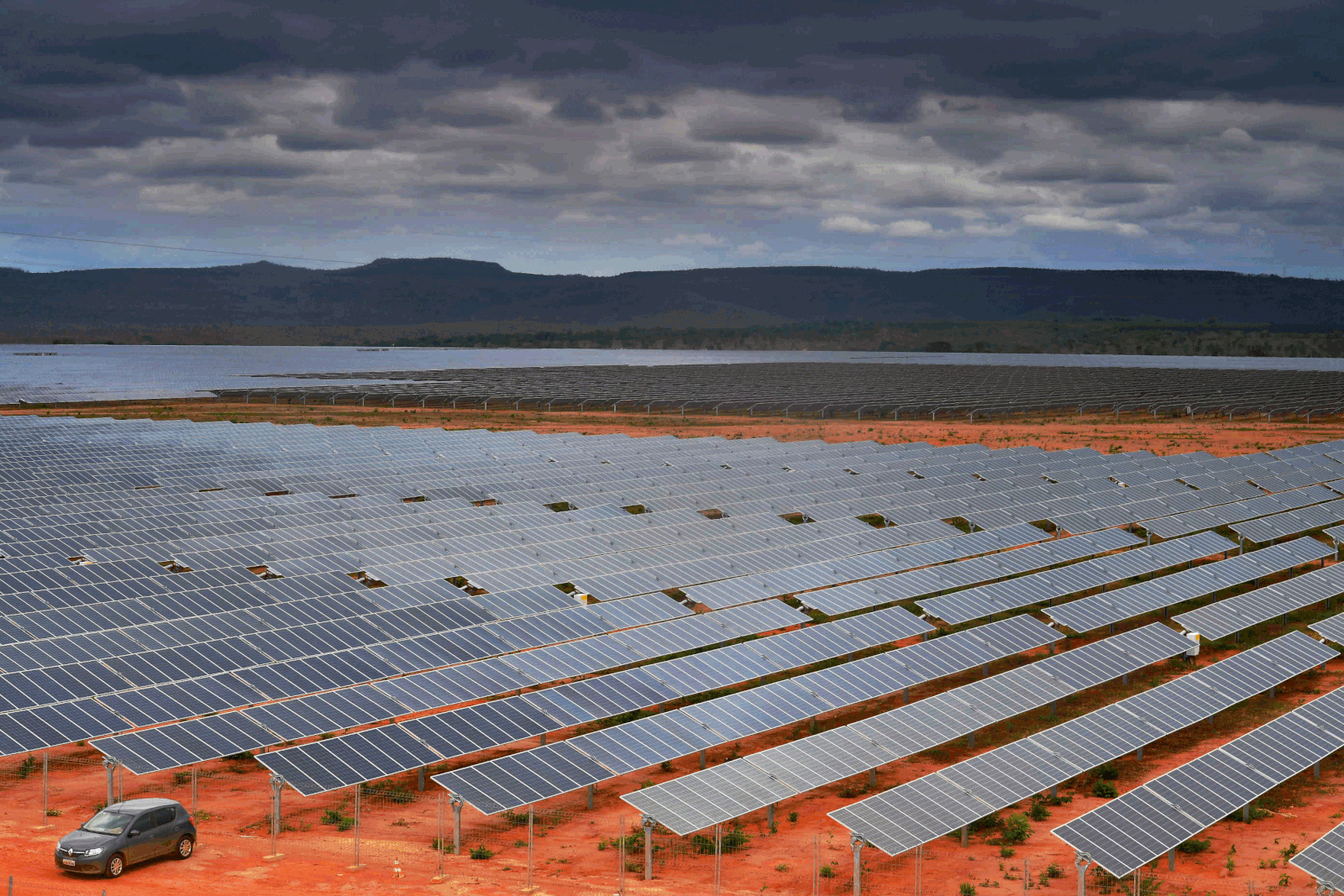
Pirapora Solar Complex, one of the largest in Brazil and Latin America, with a capacity of 321 MW.

In 2016, a factory capable of producing 400 MW of solar panels a year opened in Sorocaba in São Paulo, owned by Canadian Solar. A plan to build a solar panel factory in Rio Grande do Norte was announced by the Chinese manufacturer Chint in 2017.

in 2020 LONGi Signs Association Agreement for 908 MW of Solar Modules in Brazil.

The opening of three major solar farms in Brazil in 2017 altered the solar situation: the 292 MW Nova Olinda Solar Farm in Ribeira do Piauí, Piauí, the 254 MW Ituverava Solar Farm in Tabocas do Brejo Velho, Bahia and the 158 MW Parque Solar Lapa in Bom Jesus da Lapa, Bahia ranked among the largest installations in the world. The total capacity of these three plants was more than ten times the installed total in the entire country in 2015. A total of 1000 MW is expected to be installed in 2017 with an additional 2000 MW assigned by auctions to be completed in future years.

== Rapid growth ==
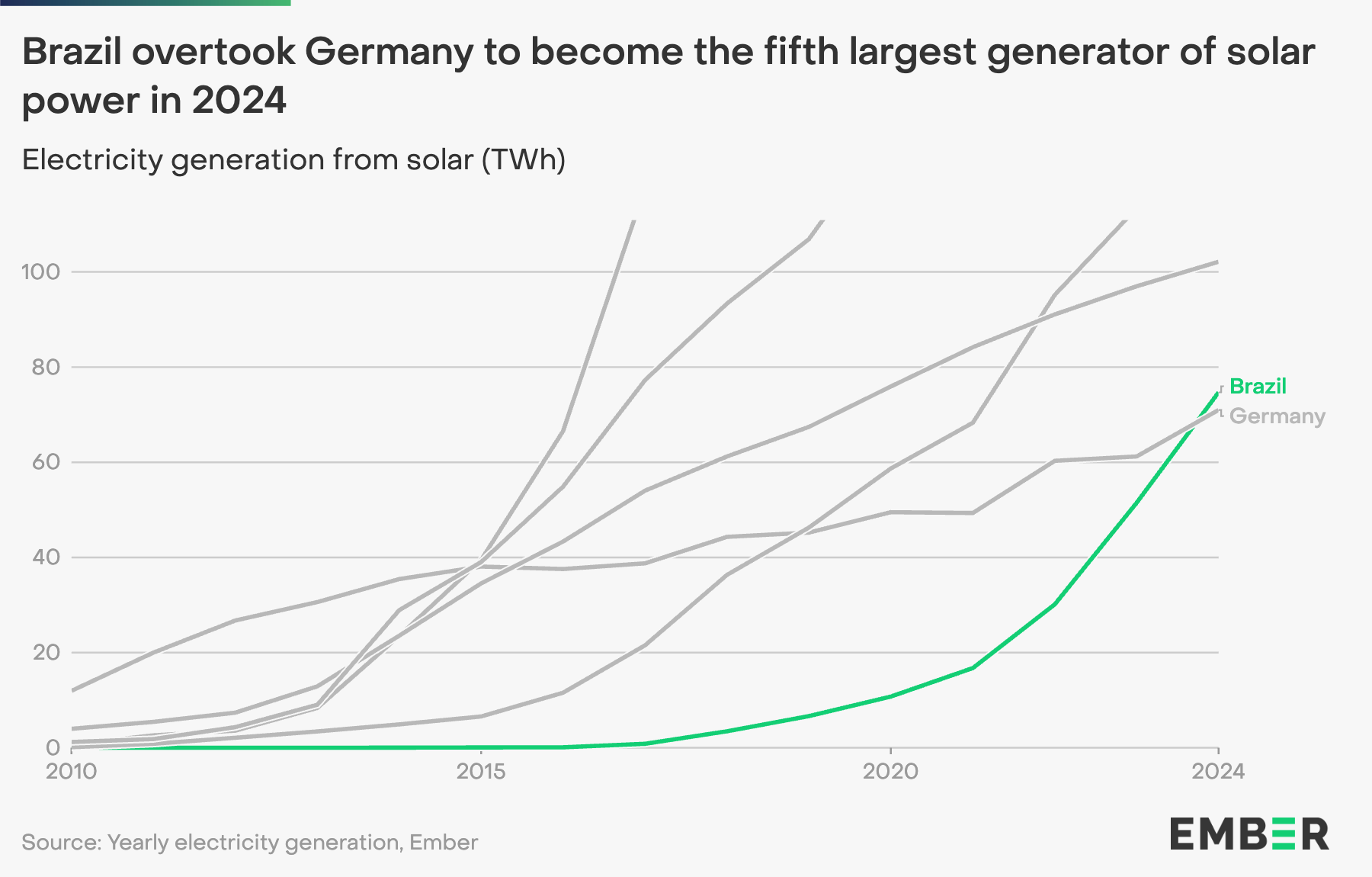
Brazil overtook Germany to become the fifth largest generator of solar power in 2024

In 2021, a number of photovoltaic and financial solutions companies expanded their work in Brazil. Companies such as Absolar, Insole, Trina Solar, Alexandria, and Evolua Energia saw significant growth. In addition, traditional energy companies such as Shell and Norway's Equinor began to get involved.

"When we arrived in the country, the market was relatively small and now it's one of the biggest ones in the world," Álvaro García-Maltrás, vice president of Trina Solar in the Caribbean and Latin America, said in a statement.

Evolua Energia concluded its first fundraising of 123mn reais (US$22mn) with a green-labelled real estate receivables certificate. The funds will be used by the company for the construction of new photovoltaic plants in the country until May 2022, with a focus on the shared distributed generation (DG) market.

As of May 2022, total installed capacity of photovoltaic solar was 15.18 GW, with 10 GW of distributed solar (where Minas Gerais stood out with 1.73 GW, São Paulo with 1.29 GW and Rio Grande do Sul with 1.17 GW of this total) and 5.18 GW in solar plants (where Bahia, with 1,354 MW, Piauí, with 1,205 MW, Minas Gerais, with 730 MW, São Paulo, with 588 MW and Ceará, with 499 MW stood out).

== Installed capacity ==
Photovoltaics Installed Capacity and Production in Brazil

Year	Installed PV capacity
Year	MW
2013	8
2014	20
2015	41
2016	148
2017	1,296
2018	2,200
2019	4,615
2020	7,881
2021	13,055
2022	24,079
2023	37,647
2024	50,675
Feb 2025	53,998

== See also ==
- Renewable energy in Brazil
- Solar power by country
- International Solar Alliance
