= Renewable energy in Brazil =

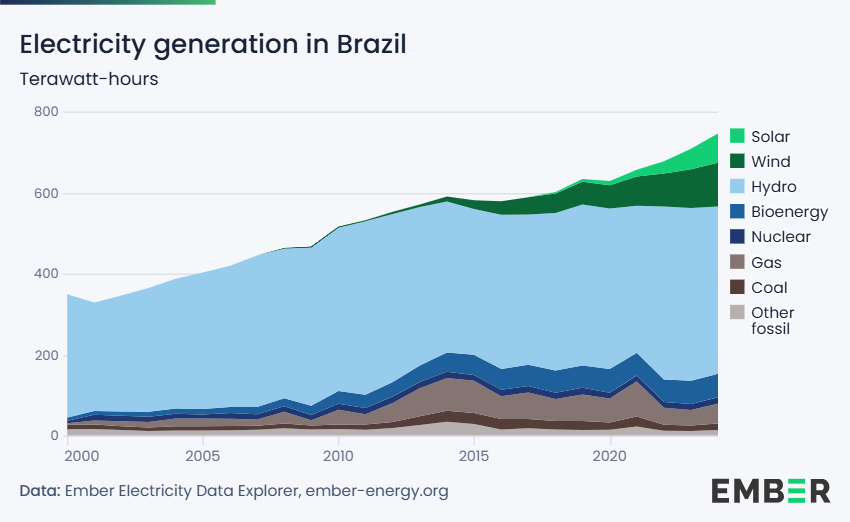
Electricity generation in Brazil per source in terawatt-hours

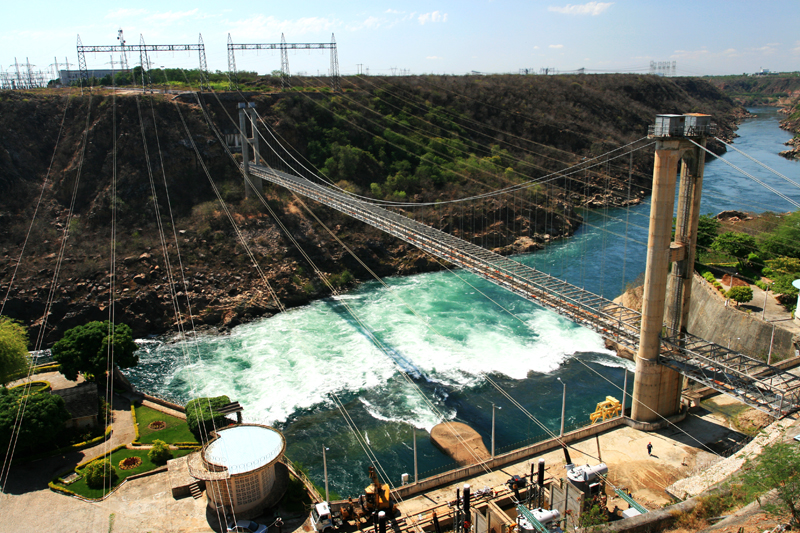
Paulo Afonso Hydroelectric Powerplant in Bahia

As of 2024, renewable energy accounted for about 88% of the electricity used in Brazil—one of the highest shares of any major economy—according to Brazil's Energy Research Company (EPE). The renewable share was around 89% in 2023, with hydropower supplying roughly 60% of generation and rapidly expanding wind and solar power making up most of the remainder.

Brazil relies on hydroelectricity for 65% of its electricity, and the Brazilian government plans to expand the share of wind energy (currently 11%), solar energy (currently 2.5%) and biomass as alternatives.

According to Brazil's Energy Master-plan 2016-2026 (PDE2016-2026), Brazil is expected to install 18,5GW of additional wind power generation, 84% in the North-East and 14% in the South.

Brazil started focusing on developing alternative sources of energy, mainly sugarcane ethanol, after the oil shocks in the 1970s. Brazil's large sugarcane farms helped the development. In 1985, 91% of cars produced that year ran on sugarcane ethanol. The success of flexible-fuel vehicles, introduced in 2003, together with the mandatory E25 blend throughout the country, have allowed ethanol fuel consumption in the country to achieve a 50% market share of the gasoline-powered fleet by February 2008.

The European Investment Bank, as of 2023, signed a €200 million loan to make renewable energy to homes in Sao Paulo's favelas more available.

== Total energy matrix and Electric energy matrix ==
Brazil's energy matrix is significantly more renewable than the global average. According to Brazil's Energy Research Office (EPE), renewable sources accounted for 50% of Brazil's total energy supply in 2024, compared with about 14% globally and 13% in OECD countries.

Brazil's electricity matrix is even more dependent on renewable sources; EPE's 2025 National Energy Balance reported that renewables accounted for about 88% of the country's electricity mix in 2024, with wind and solar together supplying about 24% of total demand.

== Electricity ==
=== Hydroelectricity ===
Hydroelectric power plants produced almost 80% of the electrical energy consumed in Brazil (now 60%). Brazil has the third highest potential for hydroelectricity, following Russia and China. At the end of 2021 Brazil was the second country in the world in terms of installed hydroelectric power (109.4 GW).

==== Itaipu power plant ====
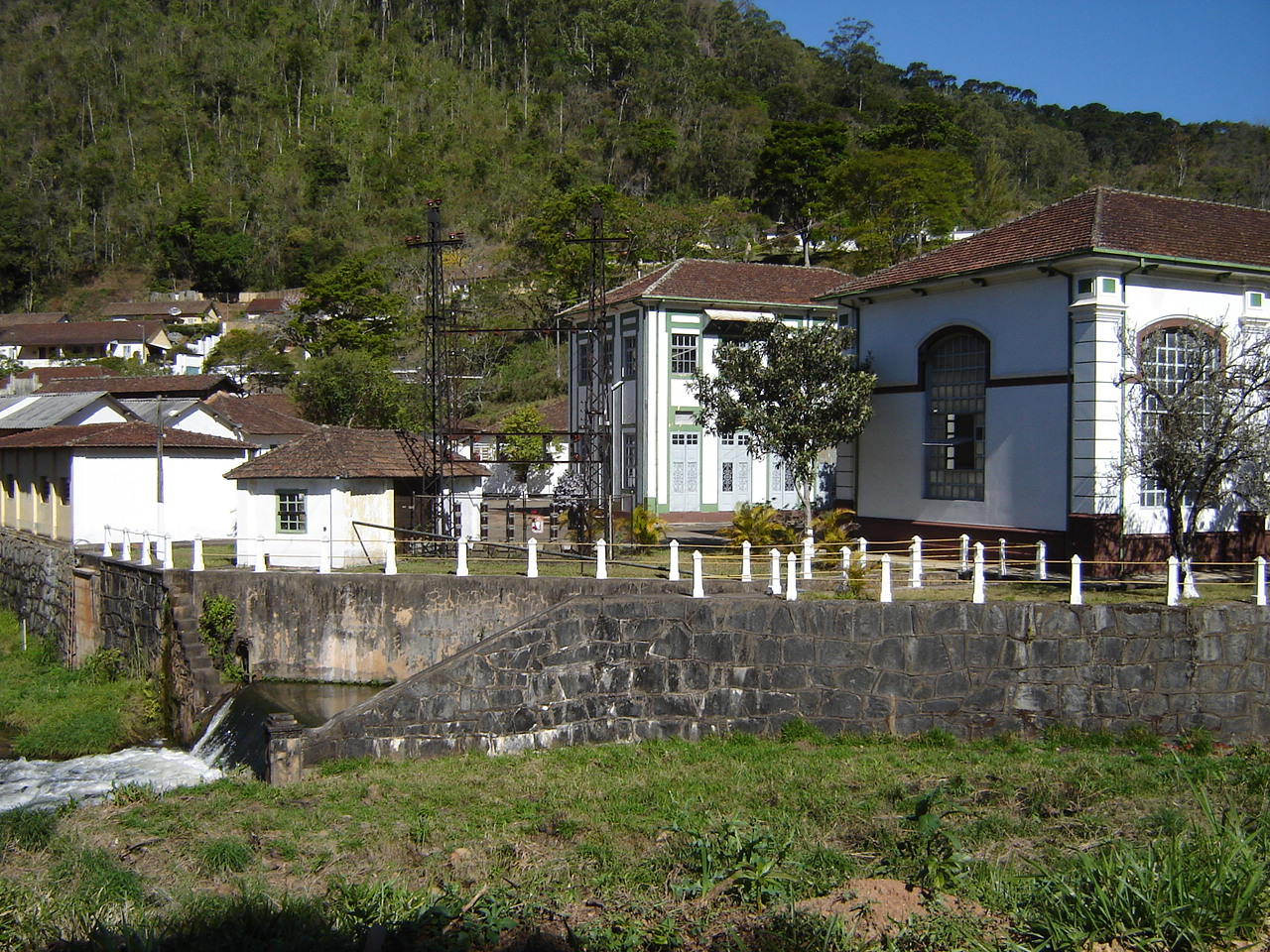
A small hydroelectric power plant in Wenceslau Braz, Minas Gerais.

The Itaipu Dam is the world's second largest hydroelectric power station by installed capacity. Built on the Paraná River dividing Brazil and Paraguay, the dam provides over 75% of Paraguay's electric power needs, and meets more than 20% of Brazil's total electricity demand. The river runs along the border of the two countries, and during the initial diplomatic talks for the dam construction both countries were suffering from droughts. The original goal was therefore to provide better management and utilization of water resources for the irrigation of crops. Argentina was also later incorporated in some of the governmental planning and agreements because it is directly affected, being downstream, by the regulation of the water on the river. If the dam were to completely open the water flow, areas as far south as Buenos Aires could potentially flood.

Construction of the dam started in 1975, and the first generator was opened in 1983. It is estimated that 10,000 locals were displaced by the construction of the dam, and around 40,000 people were hired to help with the construction of the project. Many environmental concerns were overlooked when constructing the dam, due to the trade-off considering the production of such a large amount of energy without carbon emissions, and no immediate harmful byproducts, such as with nuclear energy.

=== Wind power ===
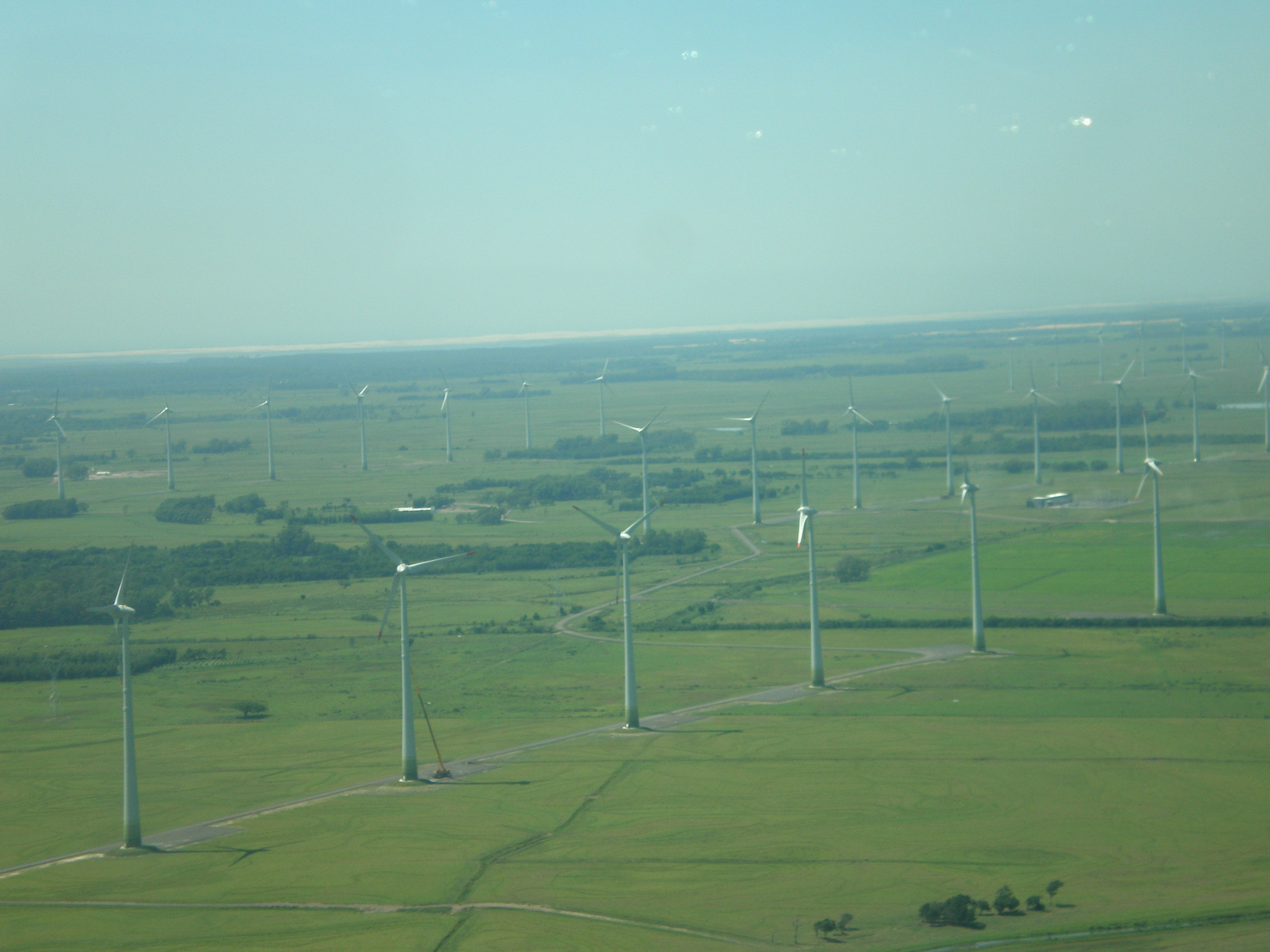
Windfarm in Osório, Rio Grande do Sul.

In July 2022 Brazil reached 22 GW of installed wind power. In 2021 Brazil was the 7th country in the world in terms of installed wind power (21 GW), and the 4th largest producer of wind energy in the world (72 TWh), behind only China, USA and Germany.

As of August 2021, the total installed wind power capacity in Brazil was 18.9 GW, with 16.4 GW in the Northeast Region and 2.0 GW in the South Region.

Wind is more intense from June to December, coinciding with the months of lower rainfall intensity. This puts the wind as a potential complementary source of energy to hydroelectricity.

While the 2009 United Nations Climate Change Conference (COP15) was taking place in Copenhagen, Brazil's National Electric Energy Agency (ANEEL) held the country's first ever wind-only energy auction. On 14 December 2009, around 1,800 megawatts (MW) were contracted with energy from 71 wind power plants scheduled to be delivered beginning 1 July 2012. The 716 MW Lagoa dos Ventos began operating in 2021.

=== Solar power ===
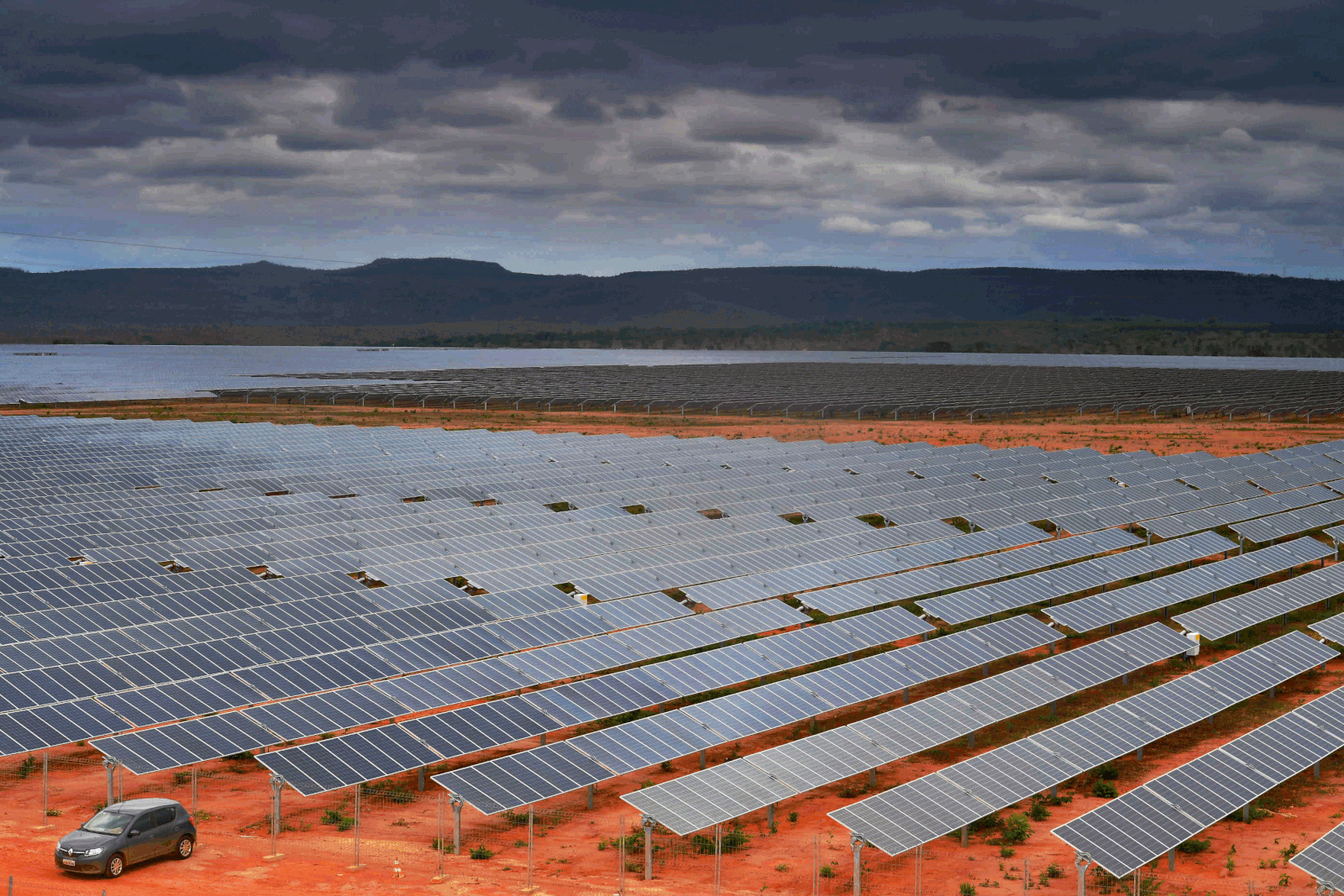
Pirapora Solar Complex, one of the largest in Brazil and Latin America, with a capacity of 321 MW.

In October 2022 Brazil reached 22 GW of installed solar power. In 2021, Brazil was the 14th country in the world in terms of installed solar power (13 GW), and the 11th largest producer of solar energy in the world (16.8 TWh). The total installed solar power in Brazil was estimated at 34.2 GW at October 2023, which consists of about 15.6% of the country's electricity matrix. In 2022, Brazil was the 8th country in the world in terms of installed solar power capacity (24.079 GW).

As of May 2022, according to ONS, total installed capacity of photovoltaic solar was 15.18 GW, with 10 GW of distributed solar (where Minas Gerais stood out with 1.73 GW, São Paulo with 1.29 GW and Rio Grande do Sul with 1.17 GW of this total) and 5.18 GW in solar plants (where Bahia, with 1,354 MW, Piauí, with 1,205 MW, Minas Gerais, with 730 MW, São Paulo, with 588 MW and Ceará, with 499 MW stood out)

Brazil has one of the highest solar incidence in the world.

The largest solar plants in Brazil consist of Ituverava and the Nova Olinda plants. The Ituverava solar plant produces 254 MW and the Nova Olinda plant produces 292 MW.

Year	Installed PV capacity
Year	MW
2013	8
2014	20
2015	41
2016	148
2017	1,296
2018	2,470
2019	4,615
2020	7,881
2021	13,055
2022	24,079
23 Oct	34.2

== Ethanol fuel ==
Brazil is the second largest producer of ethanol in the world and is the largest exporter of the fuel. In 2008, Brazil produced 454,000 bbl/d of ethanol, up from 365,000 in 2007. All gasoline in Brazil contains ethanol, with blending levels varying from 20–25%. Over half of all cars in the country are of the flex-fuel variety, meaning that they can run on 100% ethanol or an ethanol-gasoline mixture. According to ANP, Brazil also produced about 20,000 bbl/d of biodiesel in 2008, and the agency has enacted a 3% blending requirement for domestic diesel sales.

The importance of ethanol in Brazil's domestic transportation fuels market is expected to increase in the future. According to Petrobras, ethanol accounts for more than 50% of current light vehicle fuel demand, and the company expects this to increase to over 80% by 2020. Because ethanol production continues to grow faster than domestic demand, Brazil has sought to increase ethanol exports. According to industry sources, Brazil's ethanol exports reached 86,000 bbl/d in 2008, with 13,000 bbl/d going to the United States. Brazil is the largest ethanol exporter in the world, holding over 90% of the global export market.

== Biomass ==
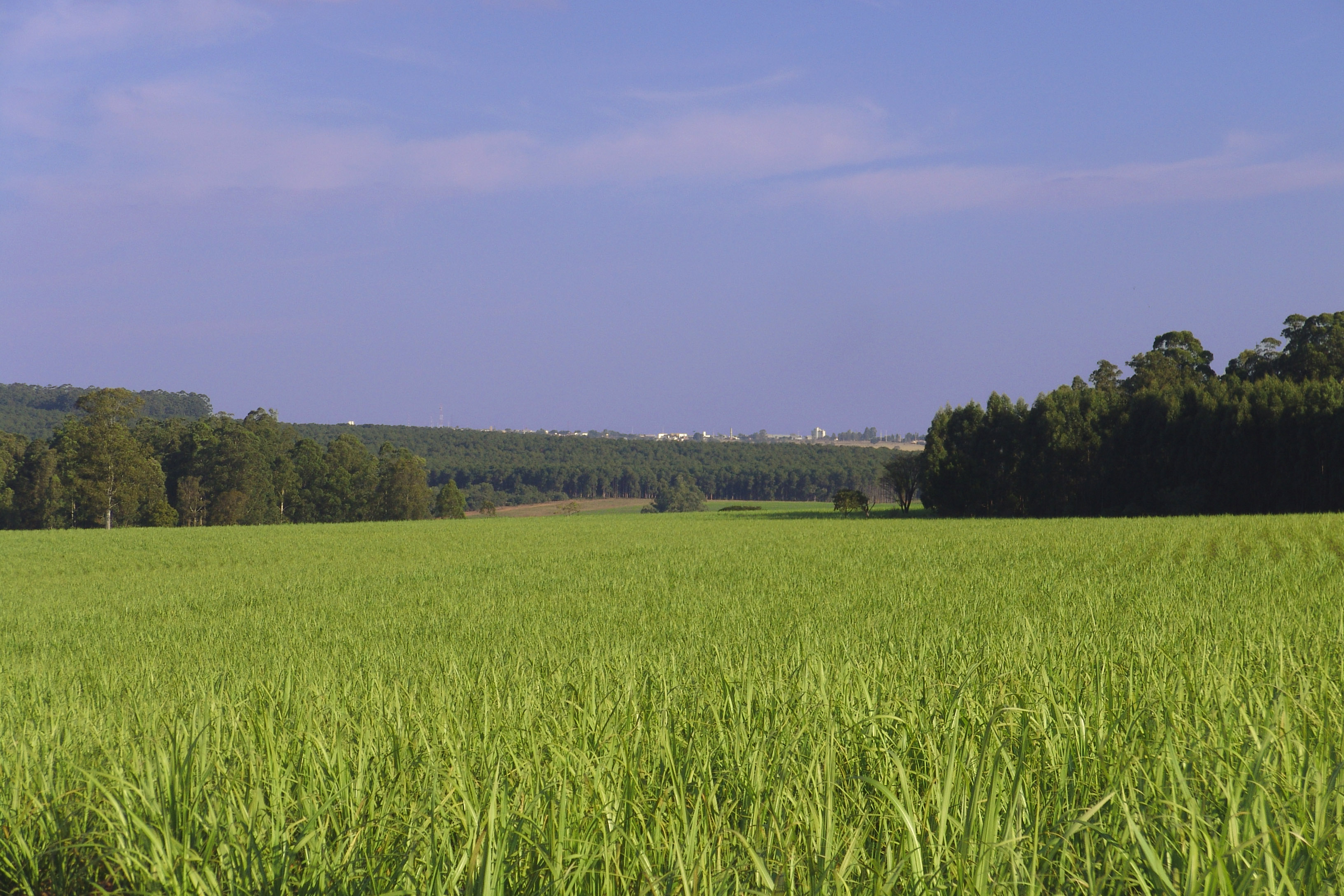
Sugarcane plantation in Avaré (State of São Paulo). Cane remains are used to produce biomass energy.

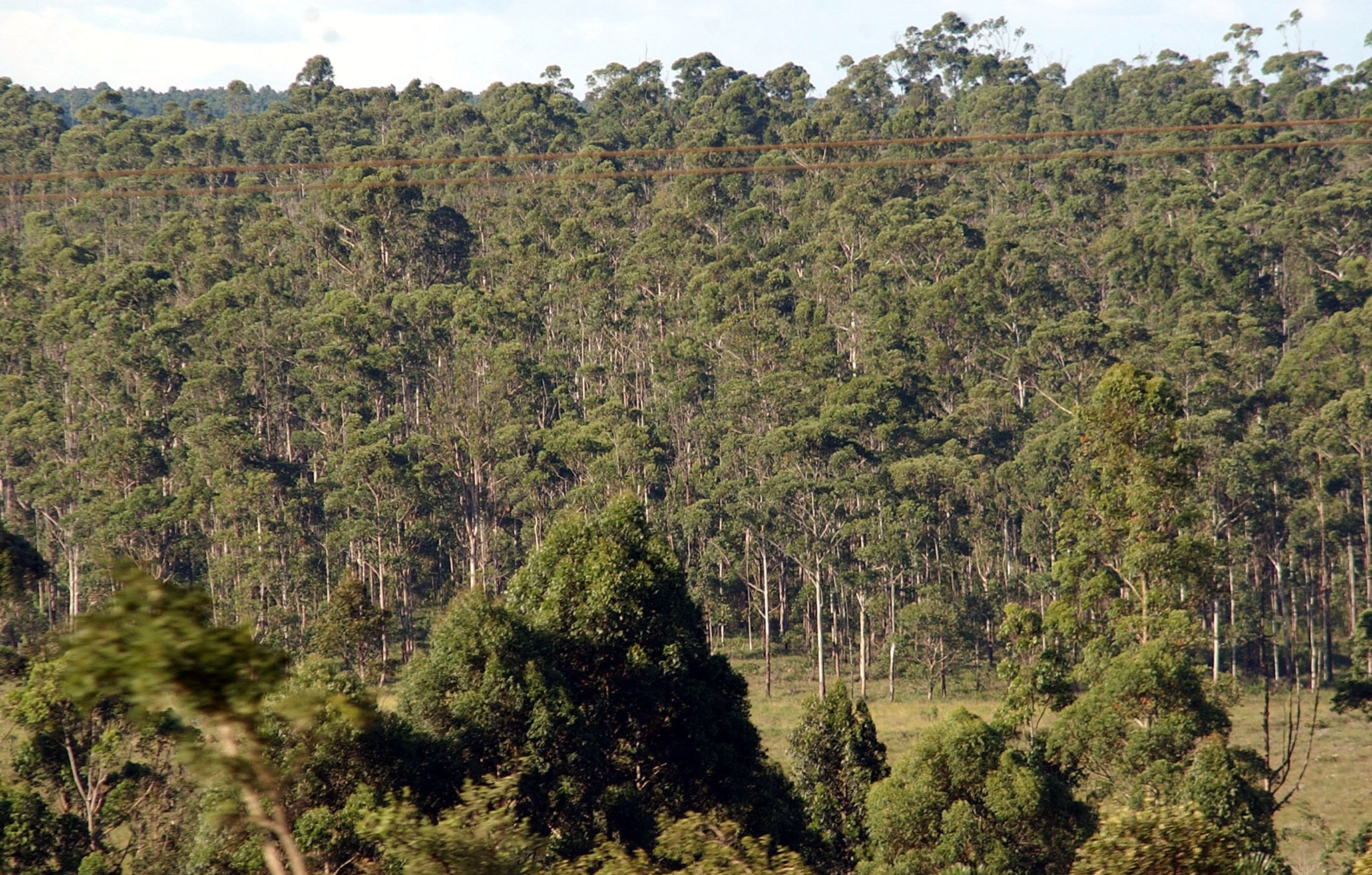
Eucalyptus in the State of Espírito Santo. Remains of the tree are reused for biomass power generation.

In 2020, Brazil was the 2nd largest country in the world in the production of energy through biomass (energy production from solid biofuels and renewable waste), with 15,2 GW installed.

Biomass is a clean energy source used in Brazil. It reduces environmental pollution as it uses organic garbage, agricultural remains, wood shaving or vegetable oil. Refuse cane, with its high energetic value, has been used to produce electricity. More than 1 million people in the country work in the production of biomass, and this energy represents 27% of Brazil's energetic matrix.

Where biomass plantations are supplying energy on a commercial basis in Brazil, the Philippines and Sweden, it can be shown that a combination of government policies or high conventional energy prices have stimulated the use of short-rotation plantations for energy. Brazil used tax incentives beginning in the mid-1960s to initiate a reforestation program to provide for industrial wood energy and wood product needs. As a consequence of the Brazilian Forestry Code with its favourable tax incentives, the planted forest area in Brazil increased from 470,000 hectares to 6.5 million hectares by 1993. With the discontinuation of the tax incentives in 1988, plantation establishment in Brazil has slowed, although the commercial feasibility of using eucalyptus for energy and other products has been clearly demonstrated.

== External funding ==
The European Investment Bank provided a €200 million loan starting 2021 to support renewable energy projects, specifically to establish a wind farm and solar power plant. This will support a series of onshore wind farms divided into two clusters, in Paraiba, Piauí, and Bahia. A solar photovoltaic plant will be built 10 km away from the Paraiba wind farm, with a total capacity of 574 MW (425 MW of wind power and 149 MW of solar power).

== See also ==
- Solar power in Brazil
- Energy policy of Brazil
- Nuclear power in Brazil
- Electricity sector in Brazil
