= Pirapora Solar Complex =

Photovoltaic power plant in Brazil

Coordinates: 17.413°S 44.902°W

The Pirapora Solar Complex (Portuguese: Complexo Solar Pirapora) is a solar power complex in the municipality of Pirapora, in the state of Minas Gerais in Brazil. With an energy capacity of 321 megawatts, the complex is one of the largest producers of solar energy in both Brazil and in Latin America.

== Energy capacity ==
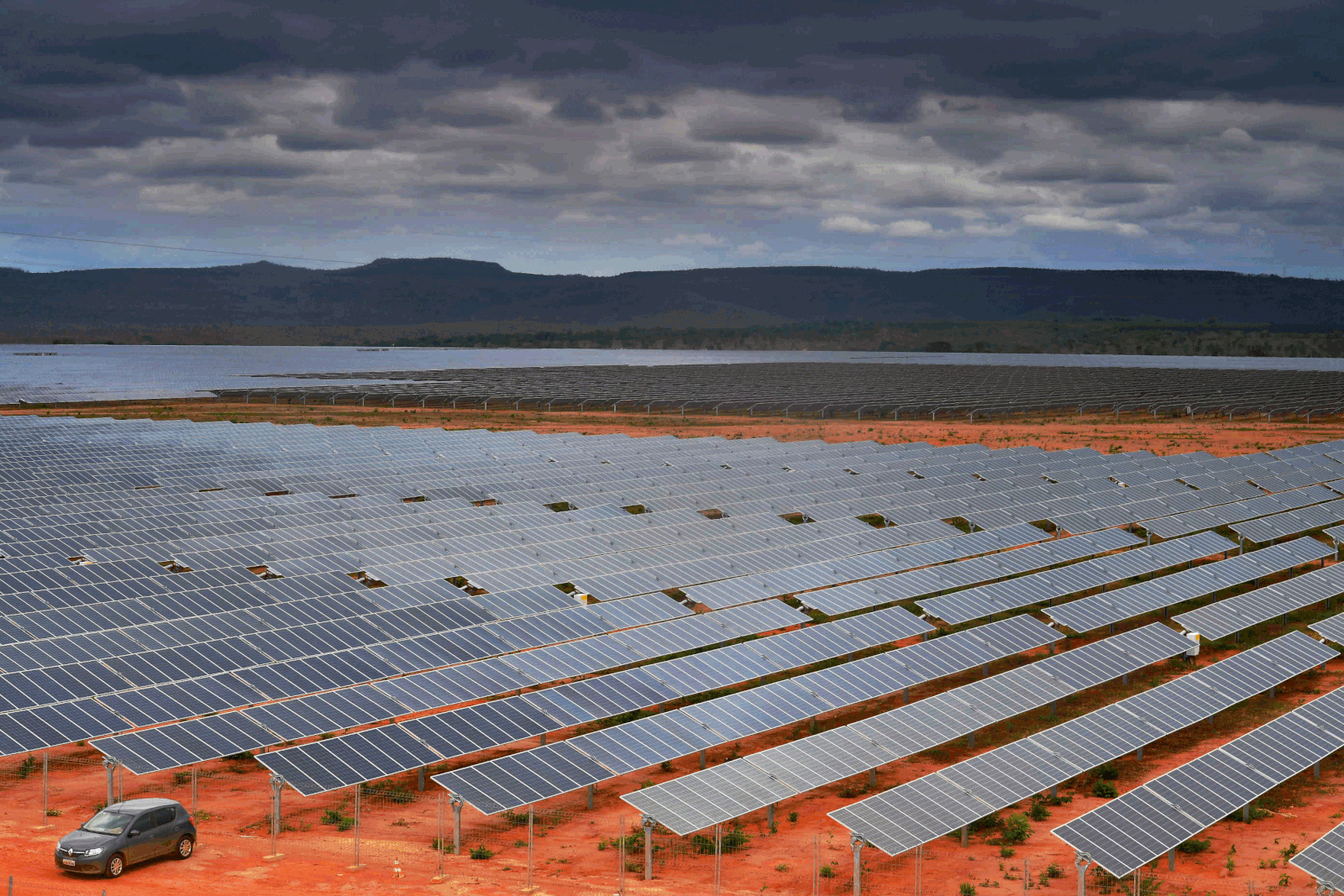
Pirapora Solar Complex on the side of the São Francisco River.

Located on a property the size of 1,500 soccer fields, Pirapora is made up of 11 solar farms, with an installed capacity of 321 megawatts. The complex is located on the side of the São Francisco River, in a region known for high solar potential. The implementation of the project, with investments with a total estimate of more than 2 billion reais and operated by the French power company Électricité de France's Renewable Energy division, operations began in September 2017. With the whole operative group, at the end of the first semester of 2018, the complex hit a capacity of 400 megawatts, which can provide energy for up to 420,000 houses annually.

== Ownership ==
Électricité de France holds 80% of the photovoltaic power from Pirapora, with the remaining 20% belonging to Canadian Solar, one of the leaders in the sector. The company was responsible for the creation of around 1.2 million photovoltaic solar panels for the complex, assembled in the state of São Paulo. The domestic assembly of the panels was a primary condition for the complex to become the first project of its kind to benefit from investments from the Brazilian Development Bank.

In August 2018, Brazilian energy company Omega Geração S.A. announced its entrance into the solar energy sector with an acquisition of 50% of Pirapora. The purchase totaled more than 1.1 billion reais, with about 40% of the transaction involving direct payments and the remaining balanced paid in long-term payments. Of the 50% that Omega Geração bought, approximately 30% of that 50% came from Électricité de France, while the remaining 20% came from Canadian Solar.

== See also ==
- Renewable energy in Brazil
