= Sault Ste. Marie Solar Park =

Photovoltaic power station in Ontario, Canada

- Country: Canada
- Location: Sault Ste. Marie, Ontario
- Coordinates: 46°32′51″N 84°16′47″W
- Status: Operational
- Commission date: 2011
- Owner: Starwood Energy

Solar farm
- Type: Flat-panel PV
- Feed-in tariff: 0.42 Canadian dollar (per kilowatt-hour)

Power generation
- Units operational: 270,000
- Nameplate capacity: 68 MW

The Sault Ste. Marie Solar Park near Sault Ste. Marie, Ontario, Canada, in 2011 became Canada's second largest photovoltaic plant with an installed capacity of 68 MW_{p}.

In 2009, Ontario introduced a feed-in tariff for renewable energy payments program paying up to CDN 44.3 cents per kilowatt-hour (kW·h) for large ground arrays such as Sault Ste. Marie. This makes Ontario's one of the top feed in tariff programs in the world. All of the power produced will be sold for CDN 42 cents per kW·h for the first 20 years.

Consisting of six 10 MW Ac projects, the first two were completed, by the POD Generating Group, in October, 2010 – the Baseline Road Facility on the west side of the city (46°31′26″N 84°26′46″W), also known as SSM1, using 87,000 Q.BASE modules from Q-Cells. The project was acquired by Starwood Energy, in June, 2010. The remainder of the project was completed by Q-Cells. SSM2 is 30 MW Ac, and SSM3 is 10 MW Ac, both near Black Road on the east side of Sault Ste Marie (46°32′51″N 84°16′47″W). The total electricity peak demand for Sault Ste. Marie is 90-100 MW in summer and 140-150 MW in winter. The instantaneous demand is displayed on the SSM PUC website. The project was completed in 2011, with about 270,000 panels. Energy generated from each of the three stations will be sold to SSM PUC through 20-year Power Purchase Agreements using Ontario Power Authority's Renewable Energy Standard Offer Program.

8 km northwest is the Prince Township Wind Farm, Canada's 3rd largest wind farm, rated at 189 MW, which along with 203 MW of hydroelectricity, further makes Sault Ste. Marie a green city.

Timeline of the largest PV power stations in the world
Year^{(a)}	Name of PV power station	Country	Capacity MW
1982	Lugo	United States	1
1985	Carrisa Plain	United States	5.6
2005	Bavaria Solarpark (Mühlhausen)	Germany	6.3
2006	Erlasee Solar Park	Germany	11.4
2008	Olmedilla Photovoltaic Park	Spain	60
2010	Sarnia Photovoltaic Power Plant	Canada	97
2011	Huanghe Hydropower Golmud Solar Park	China	200
2012	Agua Caliente Solar Project	United States	290
2014	Topaz Solar Farms^{(b)}	United States	550
2015	Talatan Solar Park	China	850
2016	Tengger Desert Solar Park	China	1547
2019	Pavagada Solar Park	India	2050
2020	Bhadla Solar Park	India	2245
2024	Midong Solar Park	China	3500
2025	Talatan Solar Park	China	8430
Also see list of photovoltaic power stations and list of notable solar parks (a) year of final commissioning (b) capacity given in MW_{AC} otherwise in MW_{DC}

== See also ==
- List of solar farms in Canada
