= Solar power in Germany =

- Installed capacity: 100 GW (2025) (5th)
- Annual generation: 71 TWh (2024)
- Capacity per capita: 1069 W (2024)
- Share of electricity: 15% (2024)

German electricity by source in 2025

- Brown coal: 67.13 TW⋅h (16.3%)
- Hard coal: 26.16 TW⋅h (6.3%)
- Natural gas: 53.64 TW⋅h (13.0%)
- Wind: 131.17 TW⋅h (31.8%)
- Solar: 70.13 TW⋅h (17.0%)
- Biomass: 36.06 TW⋅h (8.7%)
- Hydro: 16.72 TW⋅h (4.1%)
- Oil: 2.82 TW⋅h (0.7%)
- Other: 8.93 TW⋅h (2.2%)
Net generated electricity in 2025

Solar power accounted for an estimated 15% of electricity production in Germany in 2024, up from 1.9% in 2010 and less than 0.1% in 2000.

Germany has been among the world's top photovoltaic (PV) installers for several years, with total installed capacity over 100 gigawatts (GW) in 2025, up from 81.8 GW at the end of 2023. Germany's 974 watts of solar PV per capita (2023) is the third highest in the world, behind only Australia and the Netherlands. Germany's official government plans are to continuously increase renewables' contribution to the country's overall electricity consumption; current targets are 80% renewable electricity by 2030 and full decarbonization before 2040.

Concentrated solar power (CSP), a solar power technology that does not use photovoltaics, has virtually no significance for Germany, as this technology demands much higher solar insolation. There is, however, a 1.5 MW experimental CSP-plant used for on-site engineering purposes rather than for commercial electricity generation, the Jülich Solar Tower owned by the German Aerospace Center. Germany's largest solar farms are located in Meuro, Neuhardenberg, and Templin with capacities over 100 MW.

According to the Fraunhofer Institute for Solar Energy Systems, in 2022, Germany generated 60.8 TWh from solar power, or 11% of Germany's gross electricity consumption.

The country is increasingly producing more electricity at specific times with high solar irradiation than it needs, driving down spot-market prices and exporting its surplus of electricity to its neighbouring countries, with a record exported surplus of 34 TWh in 2014. A decline in spot-prices may however raise the electricity prices for retail customers, as the spread of the guaranteed feed-in tariff and spot-price increases as well. As the combined share of fluctuating wind and solar is approaching 17 per cent on the national electricity mix, other issues are becoming more pressing and others more feasible. These include adapting the electrical grid, constructing new grid-storage capacity, dismantling and altering fossil and nuclear power plants and to construct a new generation of combined heat and power plants.

== History ==
Price of solar PV systems

History of PV roof-top prices in euro per kilowatt (€/kW)

During the Reagan administration in the United States, oil prices decreased and the US removed most of its policies that supported its solar industry. Government subsidies were higher in Germany (as well as Japan), which prompted the solar industry supply chain to begin moving from the US to those countries.

Germany was one of the first countries to deploy grid-scale PV power. In 2004, Germany was the first country, together with Japan, to reach 1 GW of cumulative installed PV capacity. Since 2004 solar power in Germany has been growing considerably due to the country's feed-in tariffs for renewable energy, which were introduced by the German Renewable Energy Sources Act, and declining PV costs.

Prices of PV systems/solar power system decreased more than 50% in the 5 years since 2006. By 2011, solar PV provided 18 TWh of Germany's electricity, or about 3% of the total. That year the federal government set a target of 66 GW of installed solar PV capacity by 2030, to be reached with an annual increase of 2.5–3.5 GW, and a goal of 80% of electricity from renewable sources by 2050.

More than 7 GW of PV capacity were installed annually during the record years of 2010, 2011 and 2012. For this period, the installed capacity of 22.5 GW represented almost 30% of the worldwide deployed photovoltaics.

Since 2013, the number of new installations declined significantly due to more restrictive governmental policies.

About 1.5 million photovoltaic systems were installed around the country in 2014, ranging from small rooftop systems, to medium commercial and large utility-scale solar parks.

It's estimated that by 2017 over 70% of the country's jobs in the solar industry have been lost in the solar sector in recent years. Proponents from the PV industry blame the lack of governmental commitment, while others point out the financial burden associated with the fast-paced roll-out of photovoltaics, rendering the transition to renewable energies unsustainable in their view.

A boom in small, residential balcony-mounted solar systems (Balkonkraftwerk) has been reported in the early 2020s.

== Governmental policies ==
Feed-in tariff for rooftop solar

History of German feed-in tariffs in ¢/kWh for rooftop solar of less than 10 kW_{p} since 2001. For 2016, it amounted to 12.31 ¢/kWh.

Germany introduced its feed-in tariff in 2000 and it later became a model for solar industry policy support in other countries.

As of 2012, the feed-in tariff costs about €14 billion (US$18 billion) per year for wind and solar installations. The cost is spread across all rate-payers in a surcharge of 3.6 €ct (4.6 ¢) per kWh (approximately 15% of the total domestic cost of electricity). On the other hand, as expensive peak power plants are displaced, the price at the power exchange is reduced due to the so-called merit order effect. Germany set a world record for solar power production with 25.8 GW produced at midday on 20 and 21 April 2015.

According to the solar power industry, a feed-in tariff is the most effective means of developing solar power. It is the same as a power purchase agreement, but is at a much higher rate. As the industry matures, it is reduced and becomes the same as a power purchase agreement. A feed-in tariff allows investors a guaranteed return on investment – a requirement for development. A primary difference between a tax credit and a feed-in tariff is that the cost is borne the year of installation with a tax credit, and is spread out over many years with a feed-in tariff. In both cases the incentive cost is distributed over all consumers. This means that the initial cost is very low for a feed-in tariff and very high for a tax credit. In both cases the learning curve reduces the cost of installation, but is not a large contribution to growth, as grid parity is still always reached. Municipality-level research on EEG-supported photovoltaic installations from 2000 to 2012 found evidence of neighborhood effects: the presence of existing PV systems increased the probability and number of subsequent local installations. The study argued that these social effects could contribute to spatially inefficient deployment when fixed feed-in tariffs also encouraged installations in areas with relatively low solar radiation.

Since the end of the boom period, national PV market has since declined significantly, due to the amendments in the German Renewable Energy Sources Act (EEG) that reduced feed-in tariffs and set constraints on utility-scaled installations, limiting their size to no more than 10 kW.

The previous version of the EEG only guaranteed financial assistance as long as the PV capacity had not yet reached 52 GW. This limit has now been removed. It also foresees to regulate annual PV growth within a range of 2.5 GW to 3.5 GW by adjusting the guaranteed fees accordingly. The legislative reforms stipulates a 40 to 45 per cent share from renewable energy sources by 2025 and a 55 to 60 per cent share by 2035.

As of November 2016, tenants in North Rhine-Westphalia (NRW) will soon be able to benefit from the PV panels mounted on the buildings in which they live. The state government has introduced measures covering the self-consumption of power, allowing tenants to acquire the electricity generated onsite more cheaply than their regular utility contracts stipulate.

Germany subsidizes the installation of solar capacity.

=== Grid capacity and stability issues ===
In 2017, approximately 9 GW of photovoltaic plants in Germany were being retrofitted to shut down if the frequency increases to 50.2 Hz, indicating an excess of electricity on the grid. The frequency is unlikely to reach 50.2 Hz during normal operation, but can if Germany is exporting power to countries that suddenly experience a power failure. This leads to a surplus of generation in Germany, that is transferred to rotating load and generation, which causes system frequency to rise. This happened in 2003 and 2006. However, power failures could not have been caused by photovoltaics in 2006, as solar PV played a negligible role in the German energy mix at that time.

In December 2012, the president of Germany's "Bundesnetzagentur", the Federal Network Agency, stated that there is "no indication", that the switch to renewables is causing more power outages. Amory Lovins from the Rocky Mountain Institute wrote about the German Energiewende in 2013, calling the discussion about grid stability a "disinformation campaign".

== Potential ==
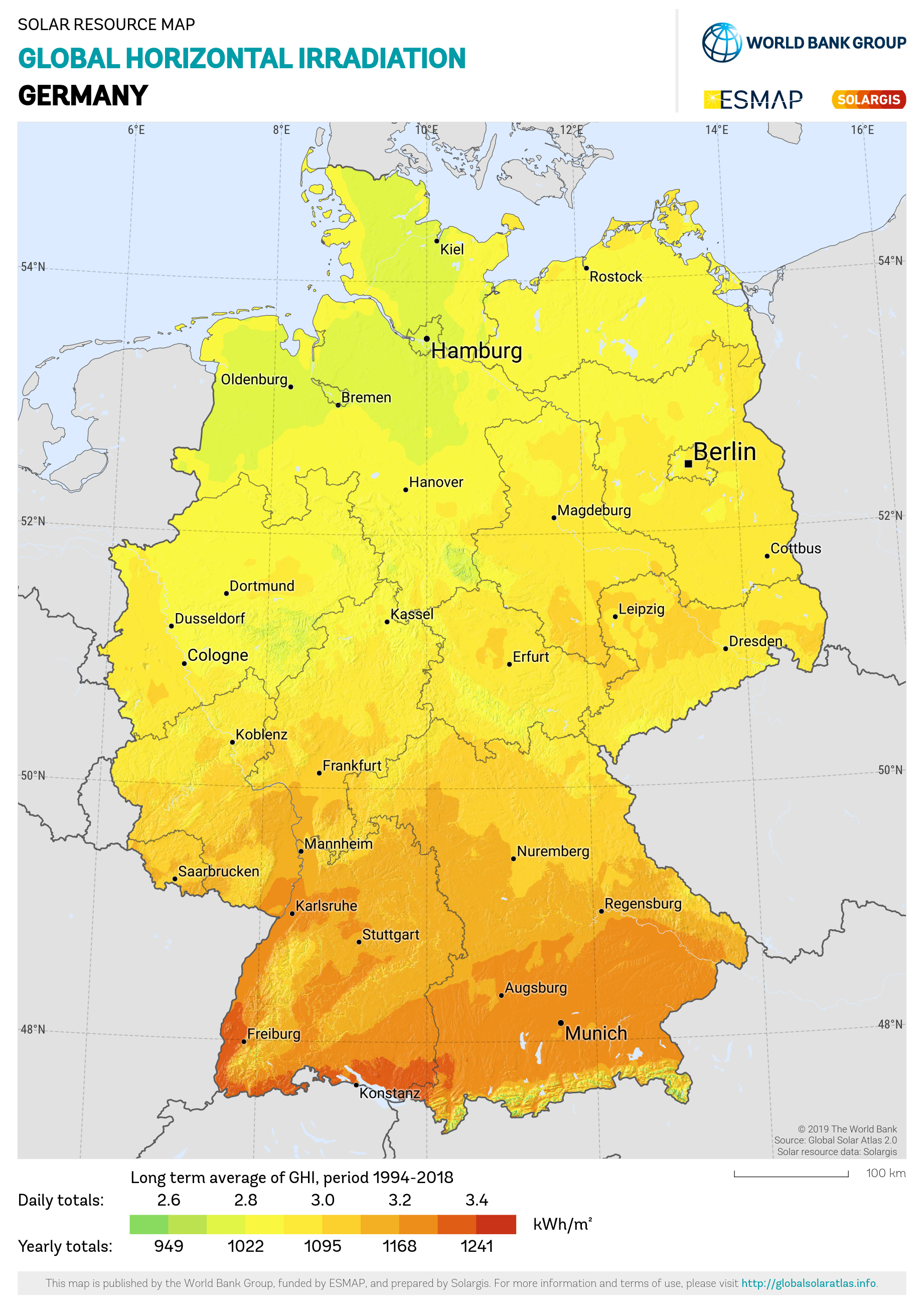
Solar potential

Germany has about the same solar potential as Alaska, which has an average of 3.08 sun hours/day in Fairbanks.

Bremen sun hours/day (avg = 2.92 hrs/day)

Stuttgart sun hours/day (avg = 3.33 hrs/day)

Source: NREL, based on an average of 30 years of weather data.

== Statistics ==
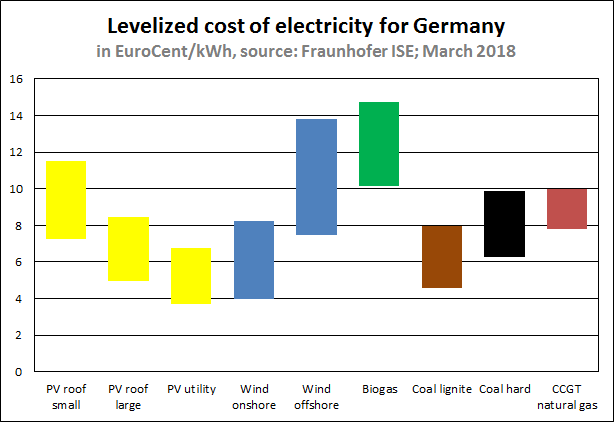
Comparison of renewable technologies and conventional power plants in Germany in EuroCent per kWh (2018)

The history of Germany's installed photovoltaic capacity, its average power output, produced electricity, and its share in the overall consumed electricity, showed a steady, exponential growth for more than two decades up to about 2012. Solar PV capacity doubled on average every 18 months in this period; an annual growth rate of more than 50 per cent. Since about 2012 growth has slowed down significantly.

In 2025, solar energy, both photovoltaic and thermal, contributed 19% of Germany’s total final renewable energy consumption, ranking third after bioenergy (48%) and wind energy (25%).

=== Generation ===
Year	Capacity (MW)	Net annual generation (GWh)	% of gross electricity consumption	Capacity factor (%)
1990	2	1	2e-04	5.7
1991	2	1	2e-04	5.7
1992	6	4	7e-04	7.6
1993	9	3	6e-04	3.8
1994	12	7	0.001	6.7
1995	18	7	0.001	4.4
1996	28	12	0.002	4.9
1997	42	18	0.003	4.9
1998	54	35	0.006	7.4
1999	70	30	0.005	4.9
2000	114	60	0.01	6.0
2001	176	76	0.013	4.9
2002	296	162	0.028	6.2
2003	435	313	0.052	8.2
2004	1105	557	0.091	5.8
2005	2056	1282	0.21	7.1
2006	2899	2220	0.36	8.7
2007	4170	3075	0.49	8.4
2008	6120	4420	0.72	8.2
2009	10566	6583	1.13	7.1
2010	18006	11729	1.9	7.4
2011	25916	19599	3.23	8.6
2012	34077	26220	4.35	8.8
2013	36710	30020	5.13	9.6
2014	37900	34735	6.08	10.9
2015	39224	37330	6.5	11.3
2016	40679	36820	6.4	10.7
2017	42293	38001	6.6	10.6
2018	45158	43451	7.7	11.6
2019	48864	44334	8.2	11.1
2020	54403	48525	8.9	10.1
2021	60108	48373	8.7	9.1
2022	67399	59596	11.1	10.1
2023	83000	63576	12.4	

Source: Federal Ministry for Economic Affairs and Energy, for capacity figures and other figures.

Note: This table does not show net consumption but gross electricity consumption, which includes self-consumption of nuclear and coal-fire power plants. In 2014, net consumption stood at about 6.9% (vs. 6.1% for gross consumption).

Nationwide PV capacity in megawatts on a linear scale since 1990.
Source: Federal Ministry for Economic Affairs and Energy

=== Solar PV by type ===
Installed PV capacity in Germany by class size 2017
Size band	% of total capacity	Notes
<10 kW	14.2%	Single direct use systems, mostly residential solar pv systems
10–100 kW	38.2%	Systems used collectively within one place such as a large residential block or large commercial premise or intensive agricultural units
100–500 kW	14.1%	Typically larger commercial centres, hospitals, schools or industrial/agricultural premises or smaller ground mounted systems
>500 kW	33.5%	Mostly district power systems, ground-mounted panels providing power to perhaps a mix of industrial and commercial sites

It is interesting to note that whilst large power plants receive a lot of attention in solar power articles, installations under 0.5 MW in size actually represented nearly two-thirds of the installed capacity in Germany in 2017.

=== PV capacity by federal states ===
Watts per capita by state in 2013: 10 – 50 watts 50 – 100 watts 100 – 200 watts 200 – 350 watts / 350 – 500 watts 500 – 750 watts >750 watts

Germany is made up of sixteen, partly sovereign federal states or Länder. The southern states of Bavaria and Baden-Württemberg account for about half of the total, nationwide PV deployment and are also the wealthiest and most populous states after North Rhine-Westphalia. However, photovoltaic installations are widespread throughout the sixteen states and are not limited to the southern region of the country as demonstrated by a watts per capita distribution.

PV capacity in MW
State	2008	2009	2010	2011	2012	2013	2014	2015	2023 (April)	W per capita (2023-4)
Baden-Württemberg	1,245	1,772	2,907	3,753	5,838.0	6,111.8	4,984.5	5,117.0	8,809	791
Bavaria	2,359	3,955	6,365	7,961	9,700.5	10,424.7	11,099.8	11,309.2	19,563	1,484
Berlin	11	19	68	50	63.2	68.6	80.5	83.9	215	58
Brandenburg	72	219	638	1,313	2,576.1	2,711.2	2,901.0	2,981.5	5,920	2,332
Bremen	4	5	14	30	32.3	35.3	39.9	42.2	70	103
Hamburg	7	9	27	25	32.1	35.8	36.5	36.9	90	48
Hesse	350	549	868	1,174	1,520.9	1,661.8	1,768.5	1,811.2	3,201	508
Lower Saxony	352	709	1,479	2,051	3,045.1	3,257.4	3,490.6	3,580.4	5,957	742
Mecklenburg-Vorpommern	48	88	263	455	957.7	1,098.5	1,337.9	1,414.4	3,519	2,184
North Rhine-Westphalia	617	1,046	1,925	2,601	3,582.0	3,878.5	4,234.9	4,363.7	8,113	452
Rhineland-Palatinate	332	504	841	1,124	1,528.2	1,670.8	1,862.2	1,920.5	3,356	817
Saarland	67	100	158	218	318.8	365.4	407.3	415.8	738	751
Saxony	168	288	529	836	1,280.8	1,412.3	1,575.1	1,607.5	2,995	740
Saxony-Anhalt	94	181	450	817	1,377.9	1,556.1	1,828.7	1,962.6	3,891	1,793
Schleswig-Holstein	159	310	695	992	1,351.5	1,407.8	1,468.6	1,498.3	2,587	885
Thuringia	95	159	327	467	871.7	1,013.9	1,119.9	1,187.4	2,226	1,055
Cumulative total installed	5,979	9,913	17,554	23,866	34,076.7	36,710.1	38,236.0	39,332.4	71,259	856
Capacity added	—N/a	3,934	7,641	6,312	10,210.7	2,633.4	1,525.9	1,096.4		

== Photovoltaic power stations ==
=== Largest photovoltaic power stations ===
PV power station	Capacity in MW_{p}	Commissioning	Location	Notes
Witznitz	605	2024	Leipzig	
Solarpark Weesow-Willmersdorf	187	2020	52°38′51″N 13°41′30″E	
Solarpark Tramm-Göhten	172	2022	53.5267°N 11.6609°E	
Solarpark Meuro	166	2011/2012	51°32′42″N 13°58′48″E	
Solarpark Gottesgabe	150	2021	52°38′29″N 14°11′32″E	
Solarpark Alttrebbin	150	2021	52°41′51″N 14°13′52″E	
Neuhardenberg Solar Park	145	September 2012	52°36′50″N 14°14′33″E	
Templin Solar Park	128.5	September 2012	53°02′N 13°32′E	
Solarpark Schornhof	120	2020	48°38′56″N 11°16′42″E	
Brandenburg-Briest Solarpark	91	December 2011	52°26′12″N 12°27′05″E	
Solarpark Gaarz	90	2021	53.4148°N 12.2470°E	
Solarpark Finow Tower	84.7	2010/2011	52°49′31″N 13°41′54″E	
Eggebek Solar Park	83.6	2011	54°37′46″N 9°20′36″E	
Finsterwalde Solar Park	80.7	2009/2010	51°34′07″N 13°44′15″E	
Solarpark Zietlitz	76	2021	53.6391°N 12.3643°E	
Lieberose Photovoltaic Park	71.8	2009	51°55′55″N 14°24′26″E	
Solarpark Alt Daber	67.8	2011	53°12′N 12°31′E	
Solarpark Ganzlin	65	2020	53.3818°N 12.2688°E	
Solarpark Lauterbach	54.7	2022	50.59600°N 9.36900°E	
Strasskirchen Solar Park	54	December 2009	48°49′N 12°46′E	
Walddrehna Solar Park	52.3	2012	51°46′N 13°36′E	
Waldpolenz Solar Park	52	December 2008	51°20′N 12°40′E	
Tutow Solar Park	52	2009/2010/2011	53°55′N 13°13′E	

Location map

=== Other notable photovoltaic stations ===
Name & description	Capacity in MW_{p}	Location	Annual yield in MWh	Capacity factor	Coordinates
Erlasee Solar Park, 1408 SOLON	12	Arnstein	14,000	0.13	50°0′10″N 9°55′15″E
Gottelborn Solar Park	8.4	Göttelborn	n.a.	n.a.	49°20′20″N 7°02′06″E
Bavaria Solarpark, 57,600 solar modules	6.3	Mühlhausen	6,750	0.12	49°09′29″N 11°25′59″E
Rote Jahne Solar Park, 92,880 thin-film modules, First Solar, FS-260, FS-262 and FS-265	6.0	Doberschütz	5,700	0.11	51°30′29″N 12°40′56″E
Bürstadt Solar Farm, 30,000 BP Solar modules	5.0	Bürstadt	4,200	0.10	49°39′N 8°28′E
Espenhain, 33,500 Shell Solar modules	5.0	Espenhain	5,000	0.11	51°12′N 12°31′E
Geiseltalsee Solarpark, 24,864 BP solar modules	4.0	Merseburg	3,400	0.10	51°22′N 12°0′E
Hemau Solar Farm, 32,740 solar modules	4.0	Hemau	3,900	0.11	49°3′N 11°47′E
Solara, Sharp and Kyocera solar modules	3.3	Dingolfing	3,050	0.11	48°38′N 12°30′E
Solarpark Herten, 11.319 Modules from Astronergy	3	Rheinfelden	3,000	0.11	47°32′39″N 7°43′30″E
Bavaria Solarpark, Sharp solar modules	1.9	Günching	n.a.	n.a.	49.2636°N 11.5907°E
Bavaria Solarpark, Sharp solar modules	1.9	Minihof	n.a.	n.a.	48.47818°N 12.91914°E

Location map

== Gallery ==
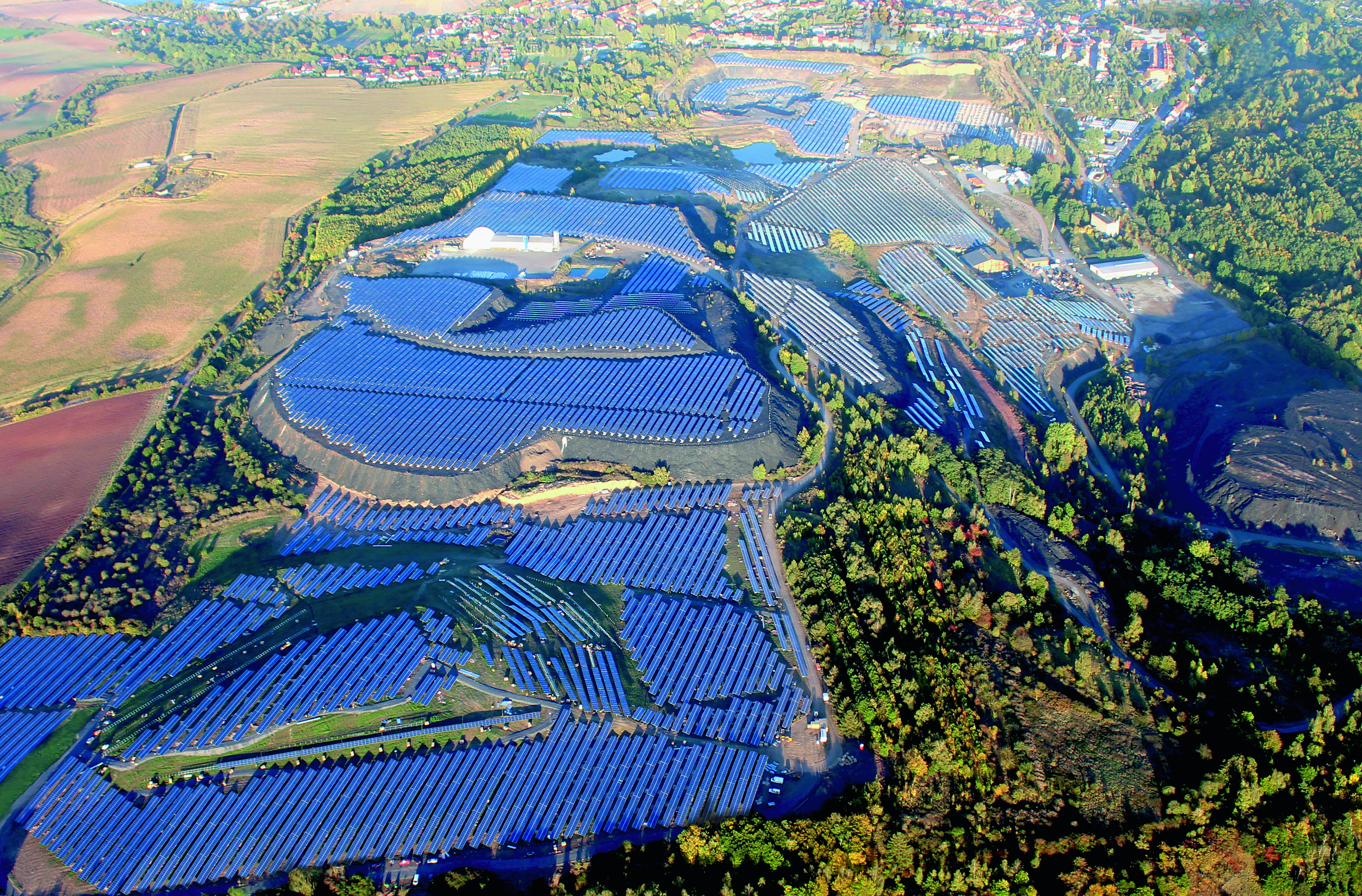
Krughütte Solar Park

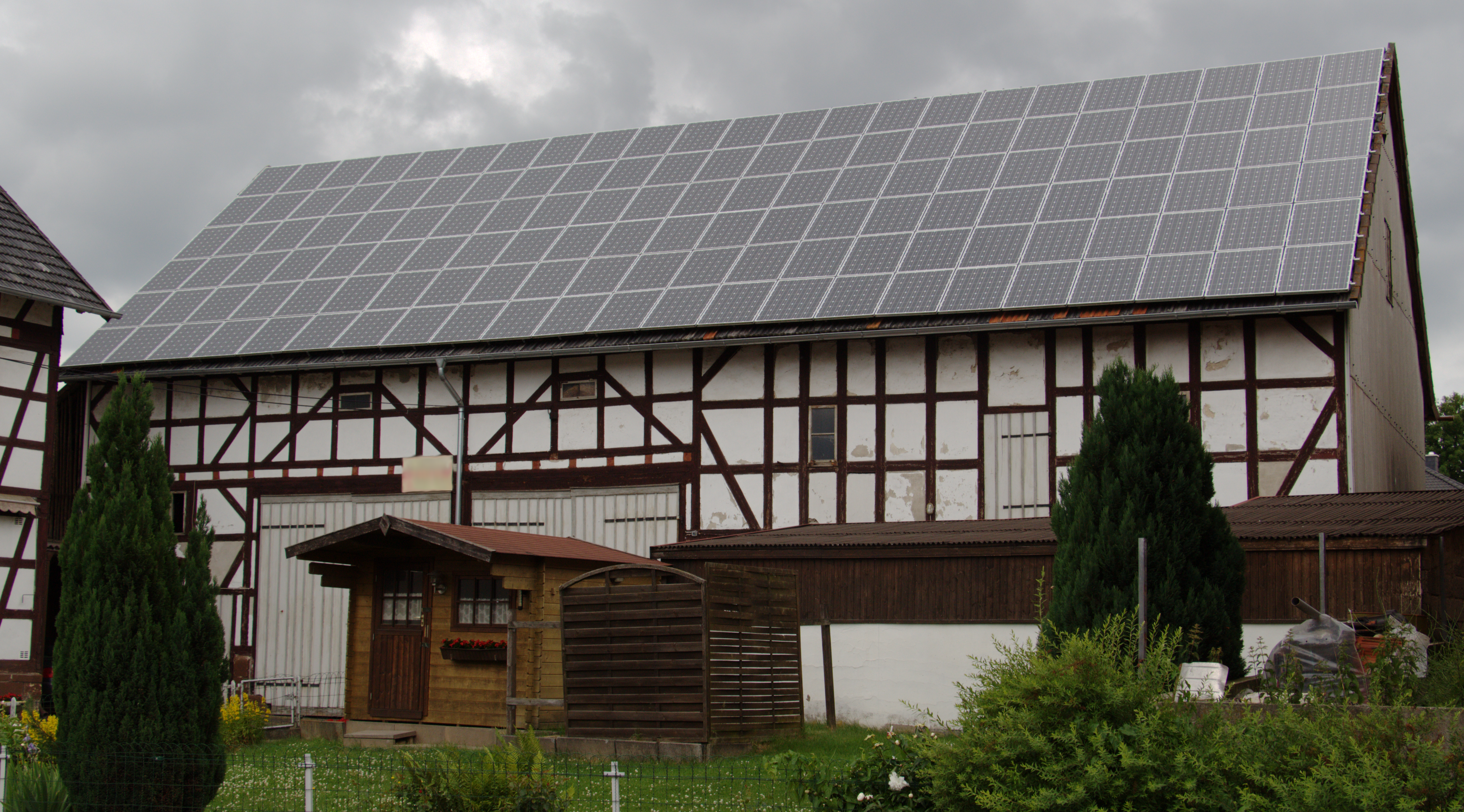
Rooftop solar on half-timbered house

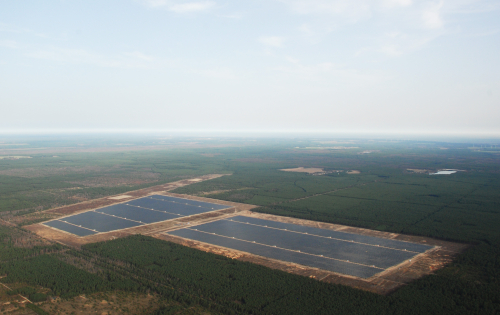
Lieberose Photovoltaic Park

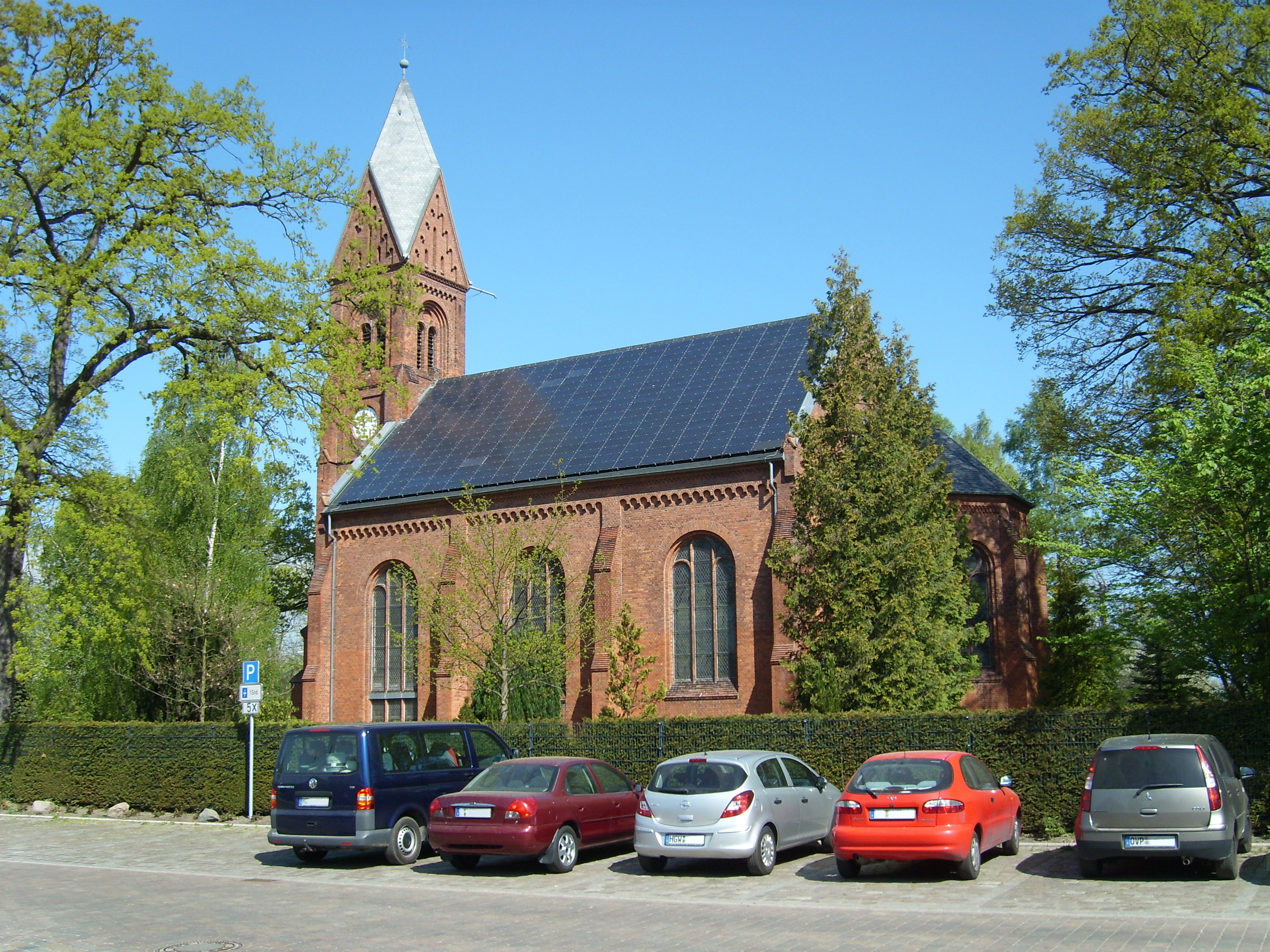
Solar panels on a church

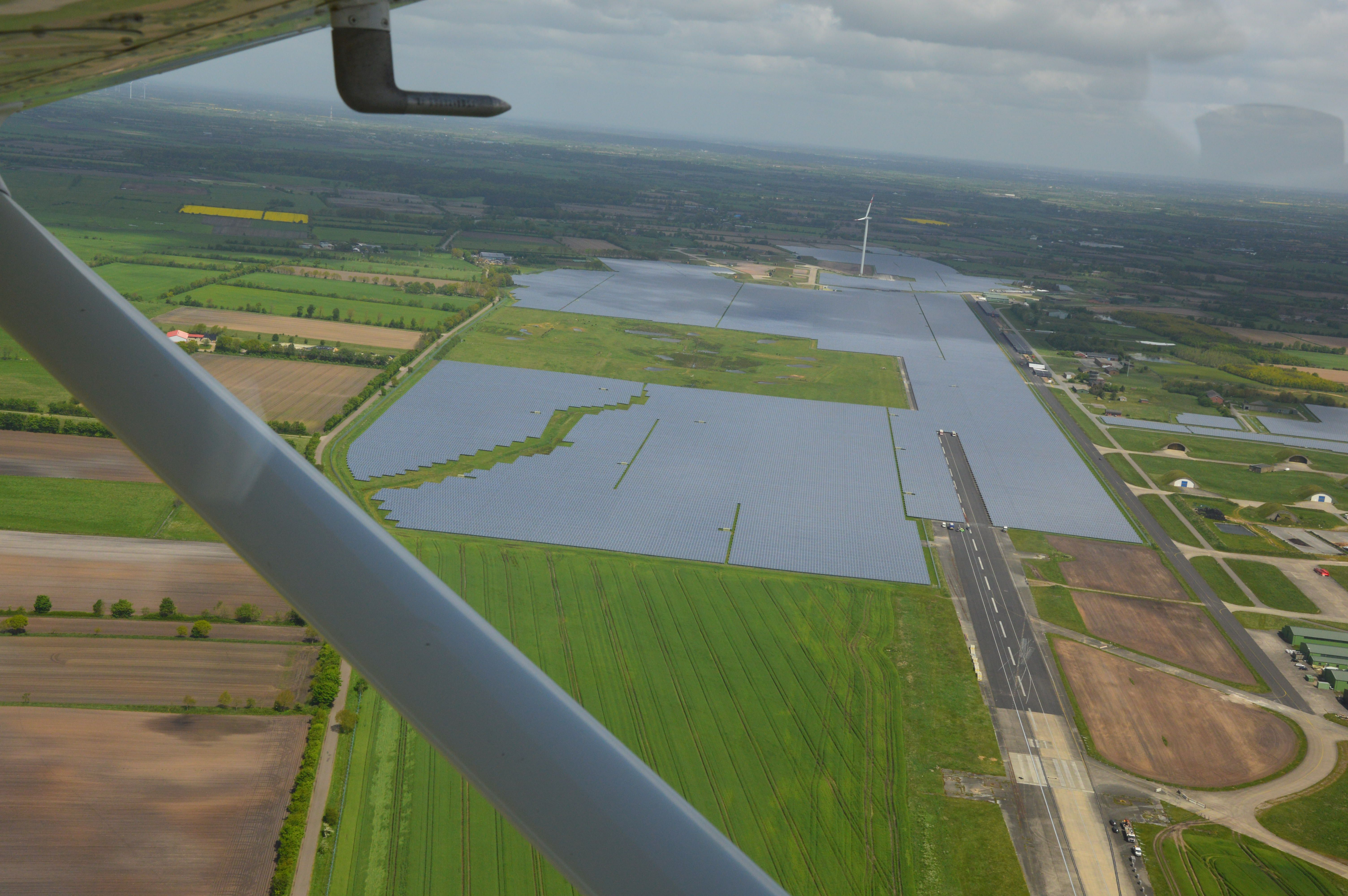
Eggebek Solar Park

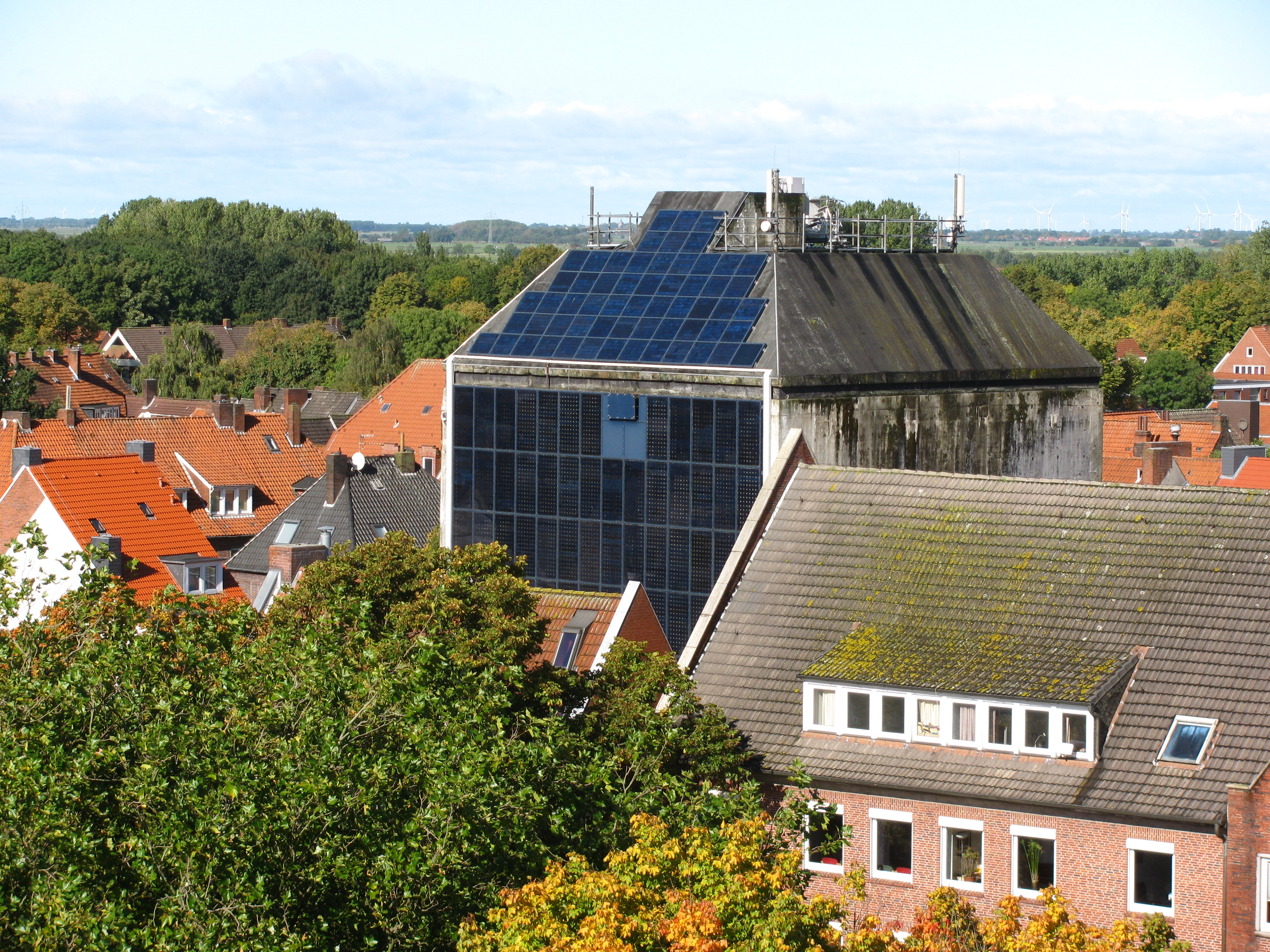
Old bunker cladded with solar

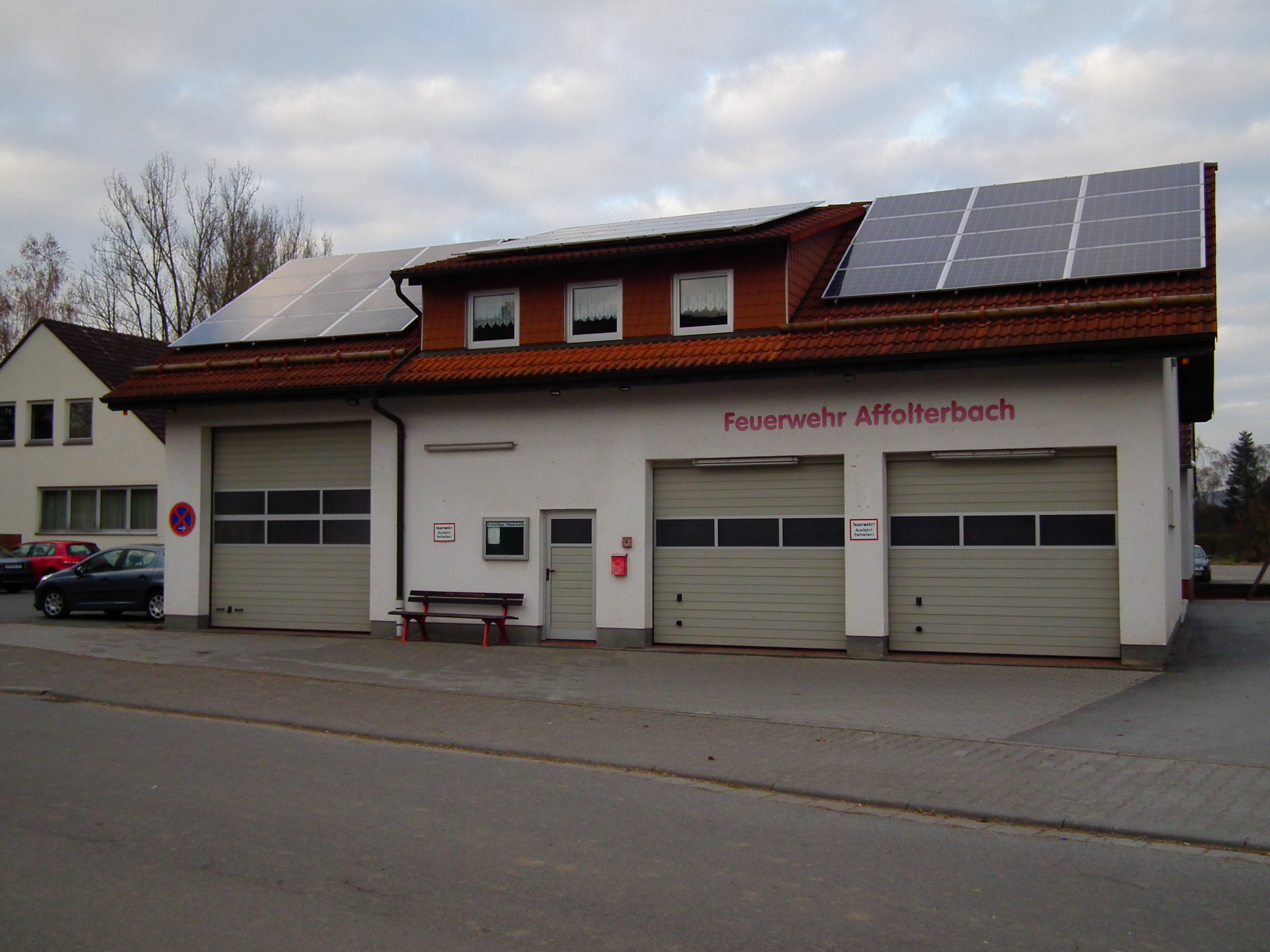
Rooftop solar PV on a fire department building

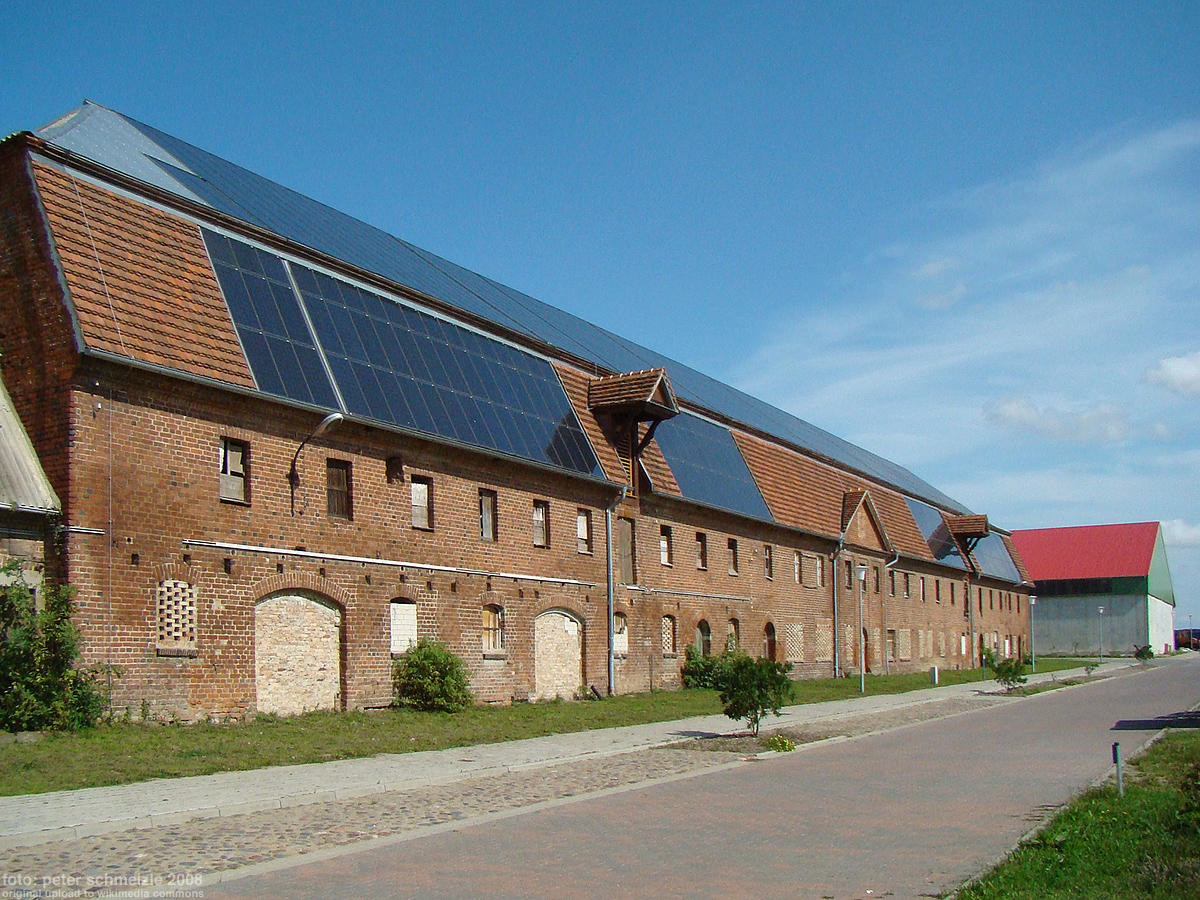
PV system on a barn

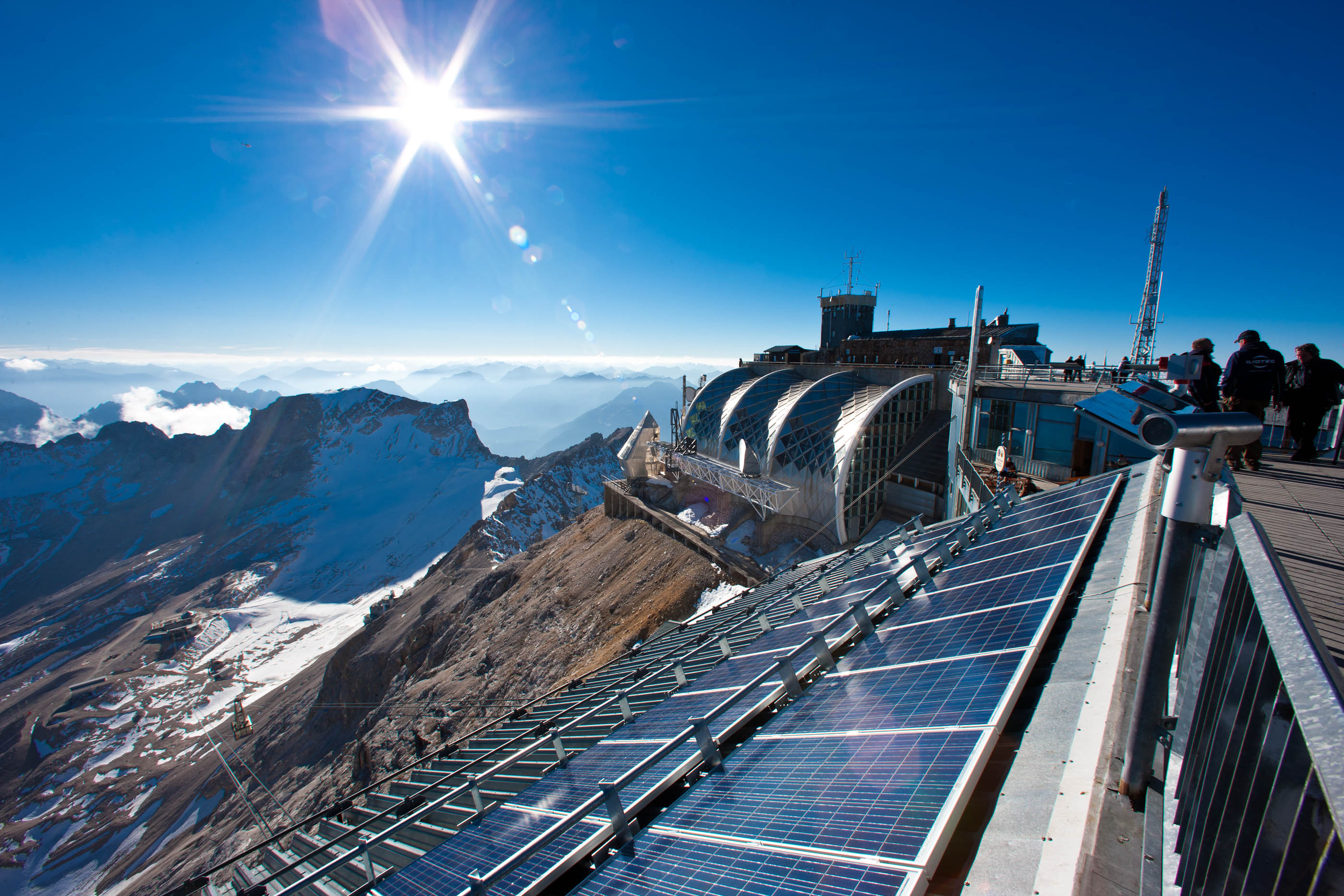
Zugspitze, Germany's highest situated PV system

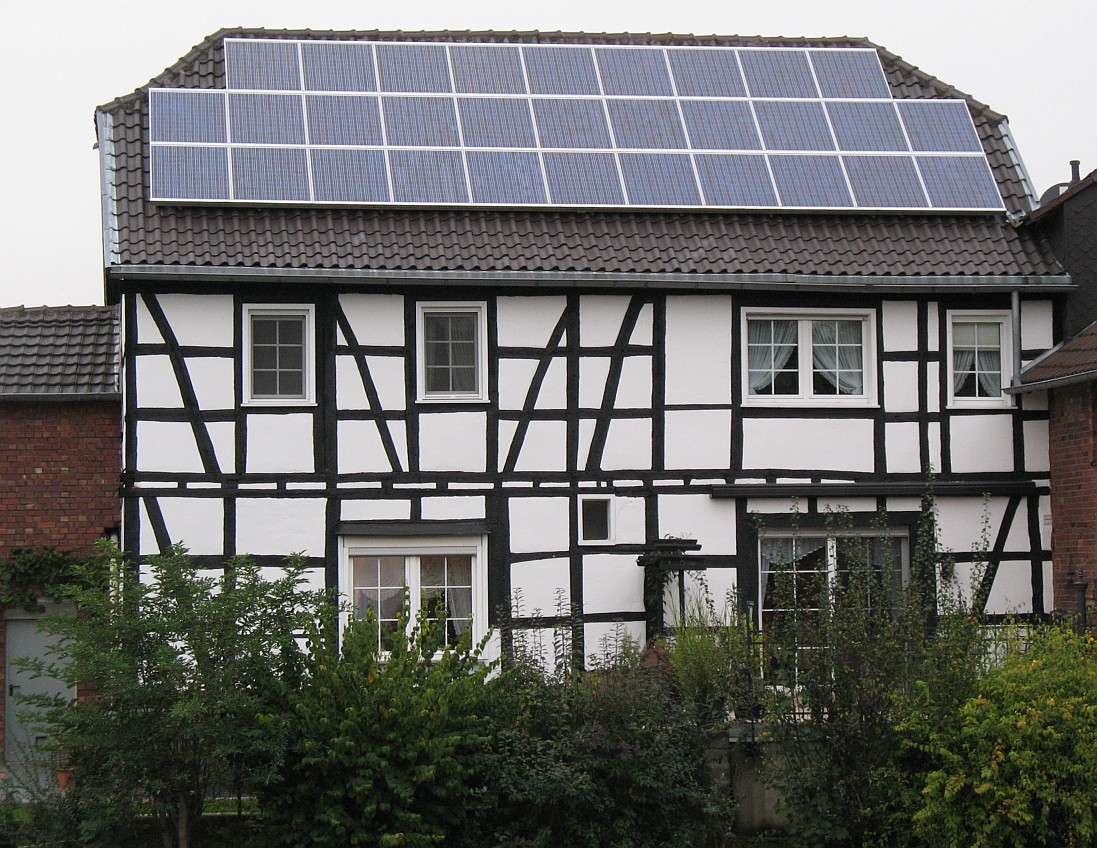
A small, roof-top mounted PV system in Bonn

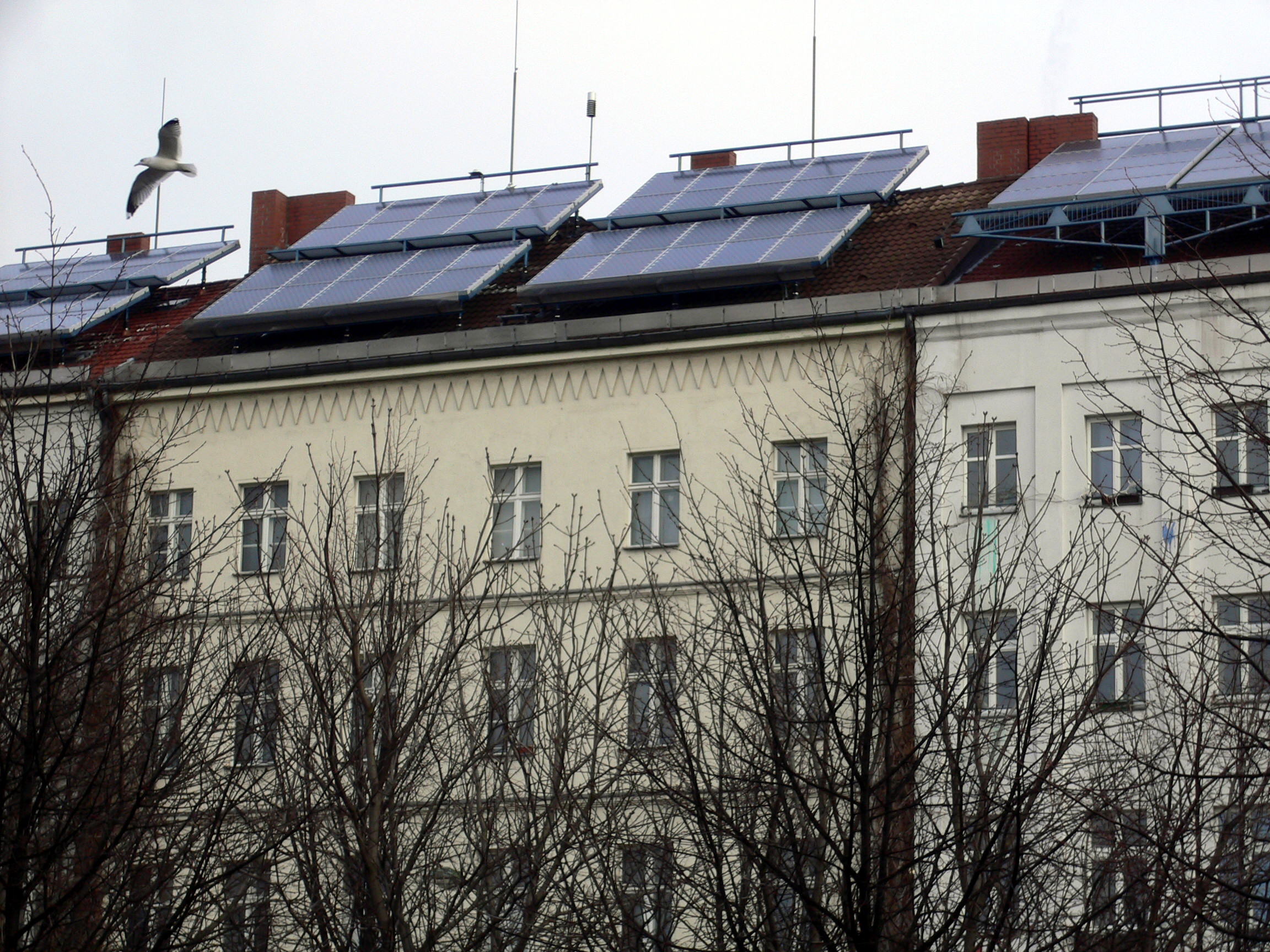
Rooftop photovoltaic power station in Berlin

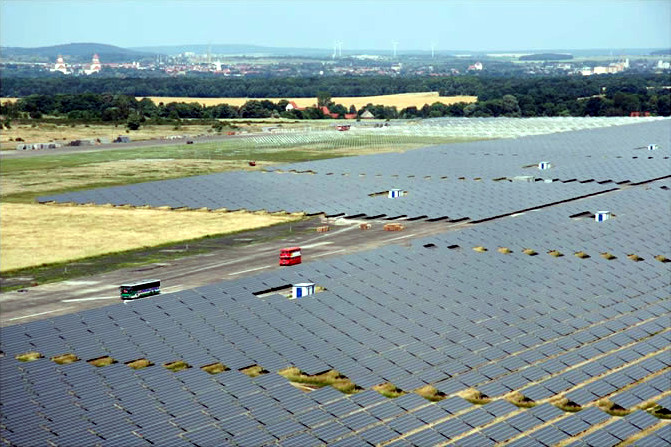
The Waldpolenz Solar Park uses thin-film CdTe-modules.

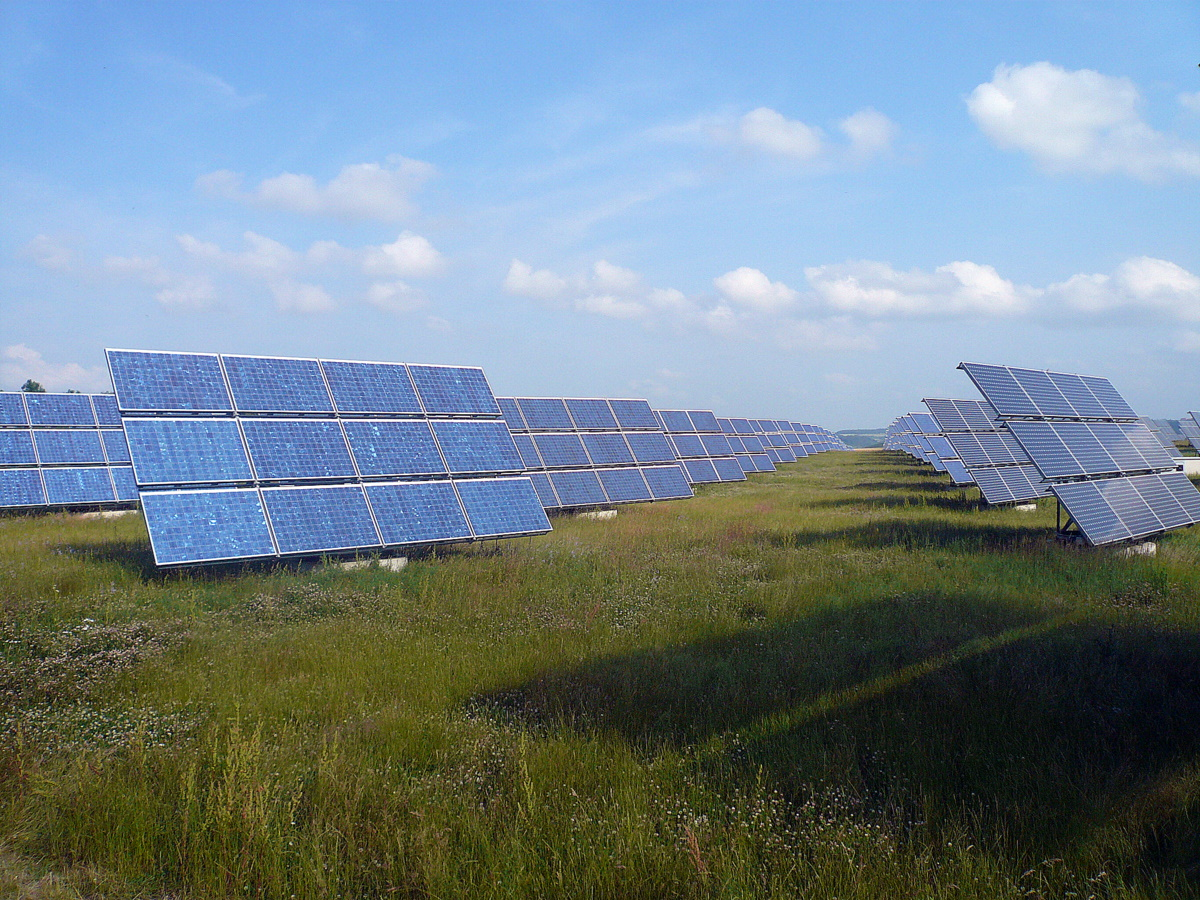
Erlasee was the world's largest solar farm in 2006/2007.

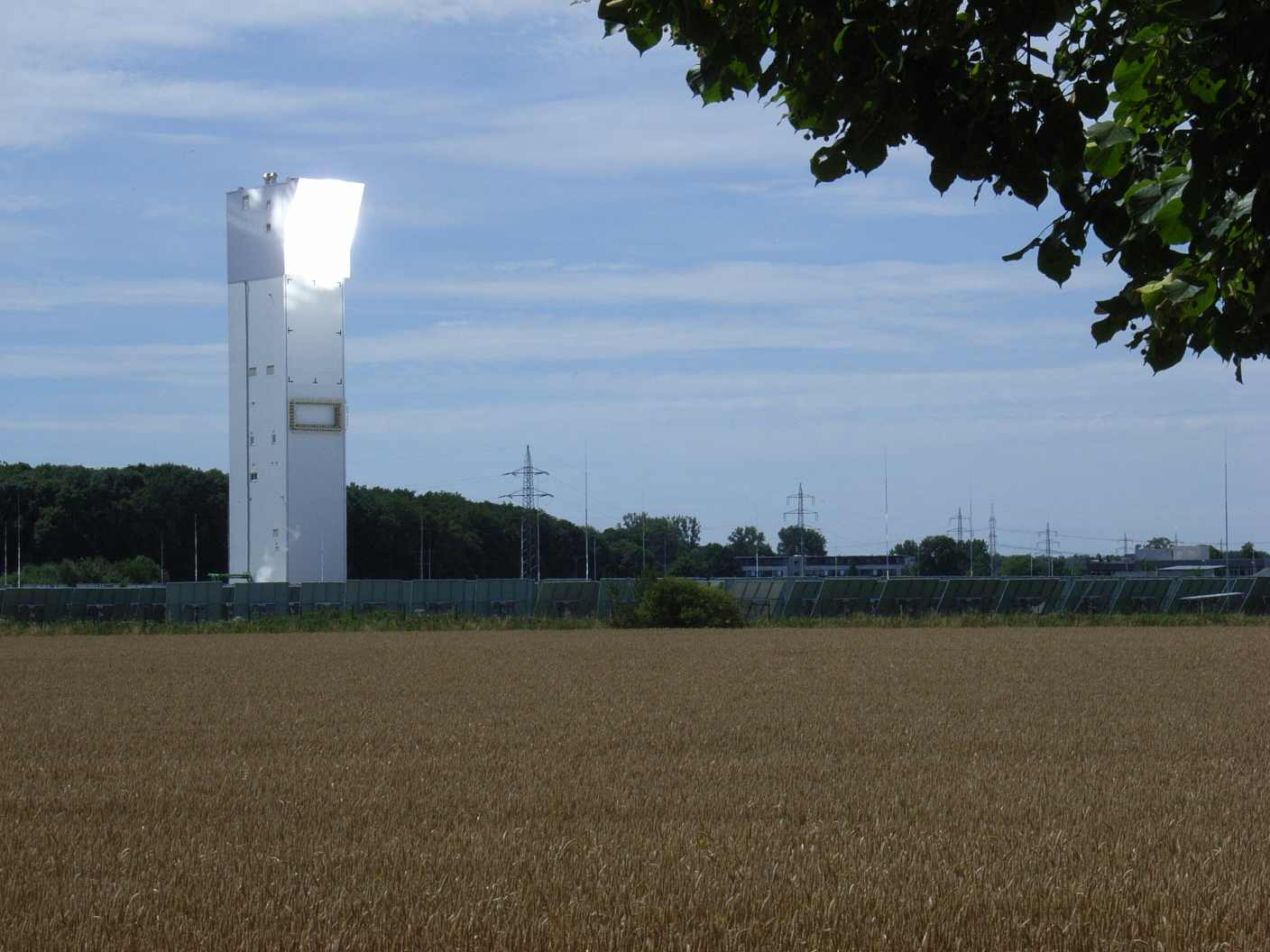
The Jülich Solar Tower, a concentrated solar power plant

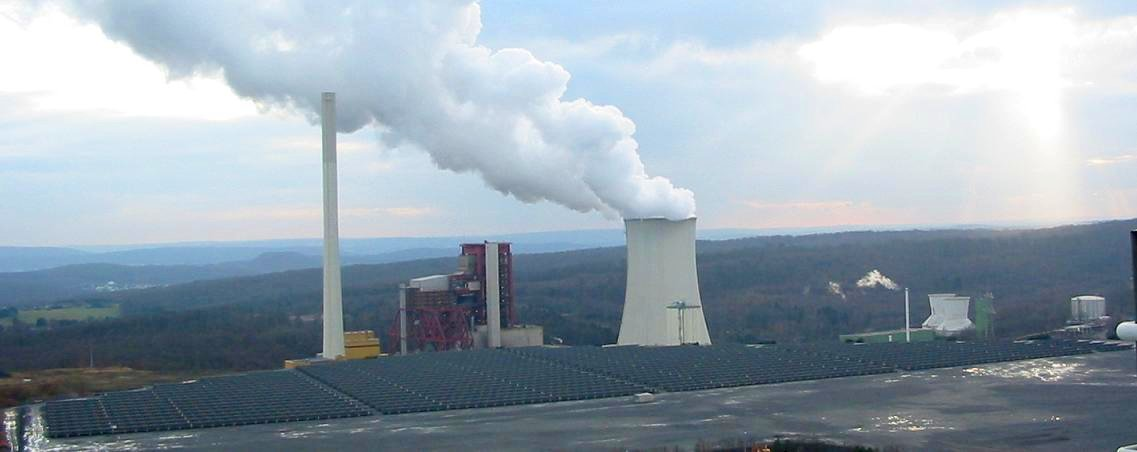
The Gottelborn Solar Park in front of coal-fired power plant "Weiher III"

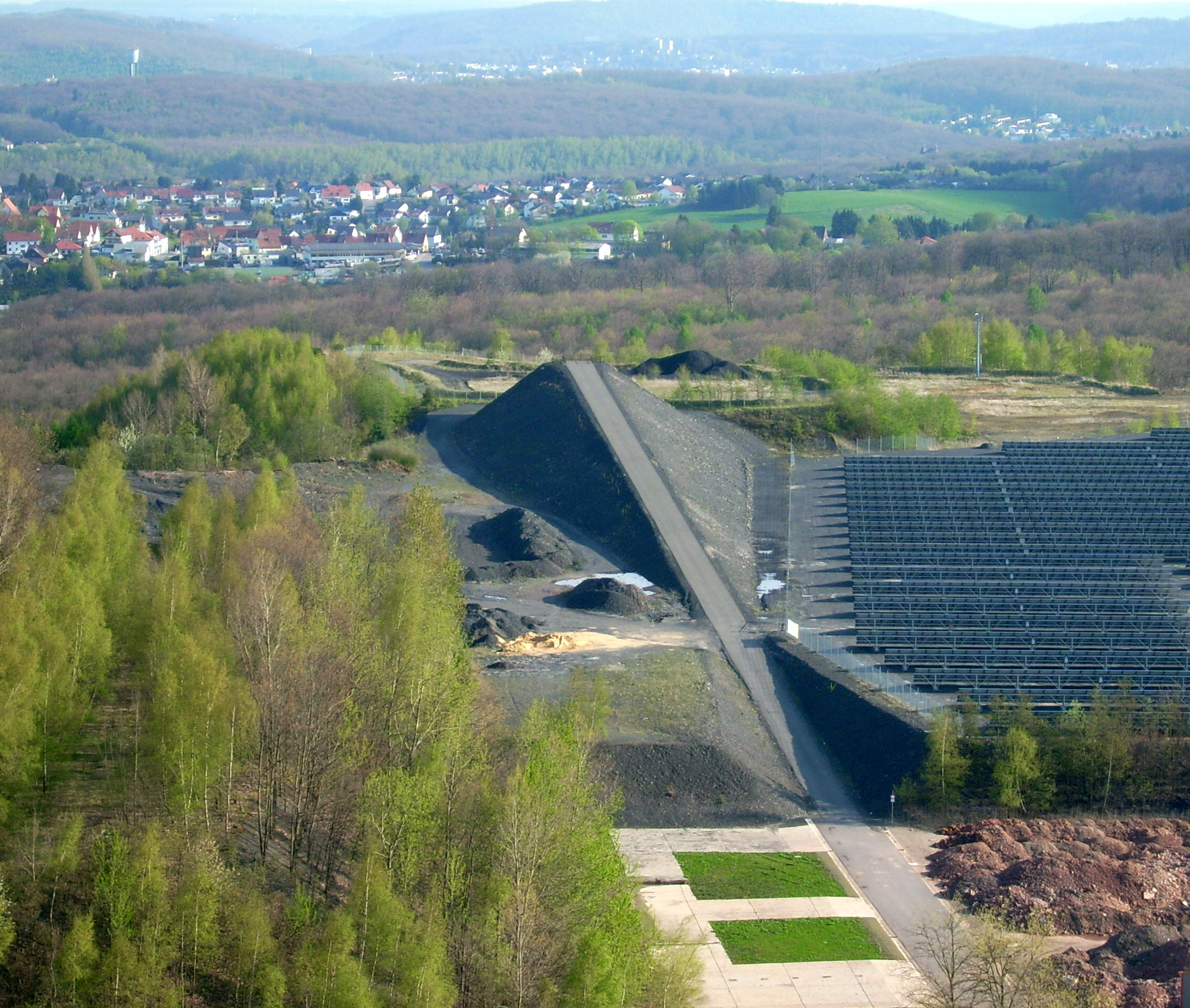
Viewing platform at the Gottelborn Solar Park

== Companies ==
Some companies have collapsed since 2008, facing harsh competition from imported solar panels. Some were taken over like Bosch Solar Energy by SolarWorld. Major German solar companies include:

- Bosch Solar Energy
- Centrosolar
- Centrotherm Photovoltaics
- Conergy
- Gehrlicher Solar
- IBC SOLAR
- Juwi
- Meyer Burger
- Phoenix Solar
- Q-Cells
- Roth & Rau
- Singulus Technologies
- SMA Solar Technology
- SolarWorld
- Solon SE

== See also ==
- German Solar Industry Association
- Renewable energy in Germany
- Solar power in the European Union
- Solar power by country
- Wind power in Germany
- Geothermal power in Germany
- Renewable energy by country
