= Erlasee Solar Park =

Photovoltaic power station in Germany

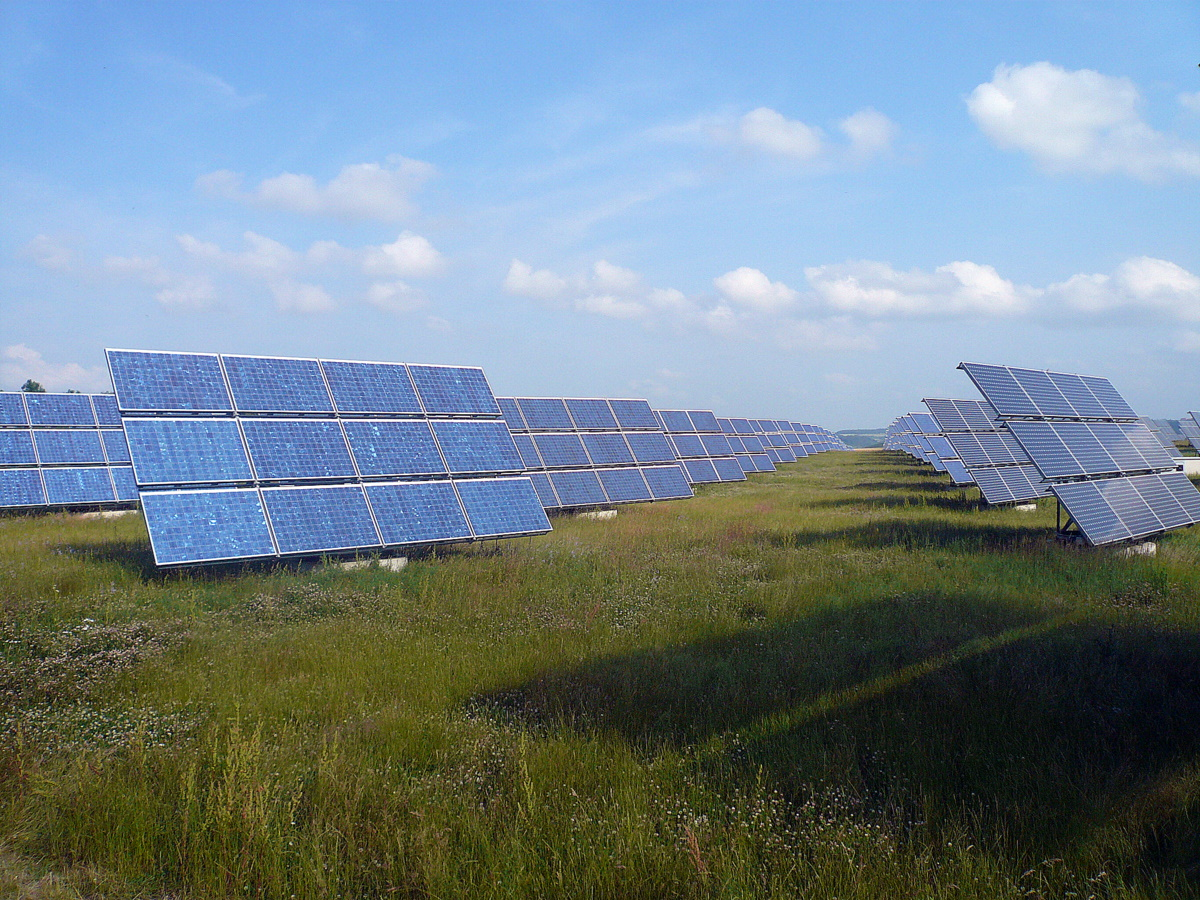
- The world's largest solar farm 2006/2007
- Country: Germany
- Location: Arnstein, Main-Spessart, Bavaria
- Coordinates: 50°0′11″N 9°55′14″E
- Status: Operational
- Construction began: 2005
- Commission date: September 2006
- Construction cost: €70 million
- Owners: S.A.G. Solarstrom and others

Solar farm
- Type: Flat-panel PV
- Site area: 77 ha (190.3 acres)

Power generation
- Units operational: 1,464 x 12
- Nameplate capacity: 11.4 MW
- Capacity factor: 13 %
- Annual net output: 14 GWh

The Erlasee Solar Park, or Solarstrompark Gut Erlasee, is an 11.4 megawatt (MW) photovoltaic power station located in Bavaria, southern Germany, in one of the sunniest regions of the country. Constructed on a former vineyard by the company Solon SE in 2006, it was then the world's largest photovoltaic power station.

The project uses 1,464 double-axis solar trackers to increase the annual electricity yield by 30 percent. Each tracker shoulders twelve conventional solar panels made of crystalline silicon. The plant generates about 14,000 megawatt-hours (MWh) annually, or as much as the average consumption of the nearby town of Arnstein.

The plant cost €70 million and covers an area of 77 ha (190 acres). The project was officially commissioned on 1 September 2006. The inauguration party included a concert given by the popular German rock bands BAP and The BossHoss.

Timeline of the largest PV power stations in the world
Year^{(a)}	Name of PV power station	Country	Capacity MW
1982	Lugo	United States	1
1985	Carrisa Plain	United States	5.6
2005	Bavaria Solarpark (Mühlhausen)	Germany	6.3
2006	Erlasee Solar Park	Germany	11.4
2008	Olmedilla Photovoltaic Park	Spain	60
2010	Sarnia Photovoltaic Power Plant	Canada	97
2011	Huanghe Hydropower Golmud Solar Park	China	200
2012	Agua Caliente Solar Project	United States	290
2014	Topaz Solar Farms^{(b)}	United States	550
2015	Talatan Solar Park	China	850
2016	Tengger Desert Solar Park	China	1547
2019	Pavagada Solar Park	India	2050
2020	Bhadla Solar Park	India	2245
2024	Midong Solar Park	China	3500
2025	Talatan Solar Park	China	8430
Also see list of photovoltaic power stations and list of notable solar parks (a) year of final commissioning (b) capacity given in MW_{AC} otherwise in MW_{DC}

== See also ==
- Solar power in Germany
- List of photovoltaic power stations
