= Sarnia Photovoltaic Power Plant =

Photovoltaic power station in Ontario, Canada

Sarnia Solar Project
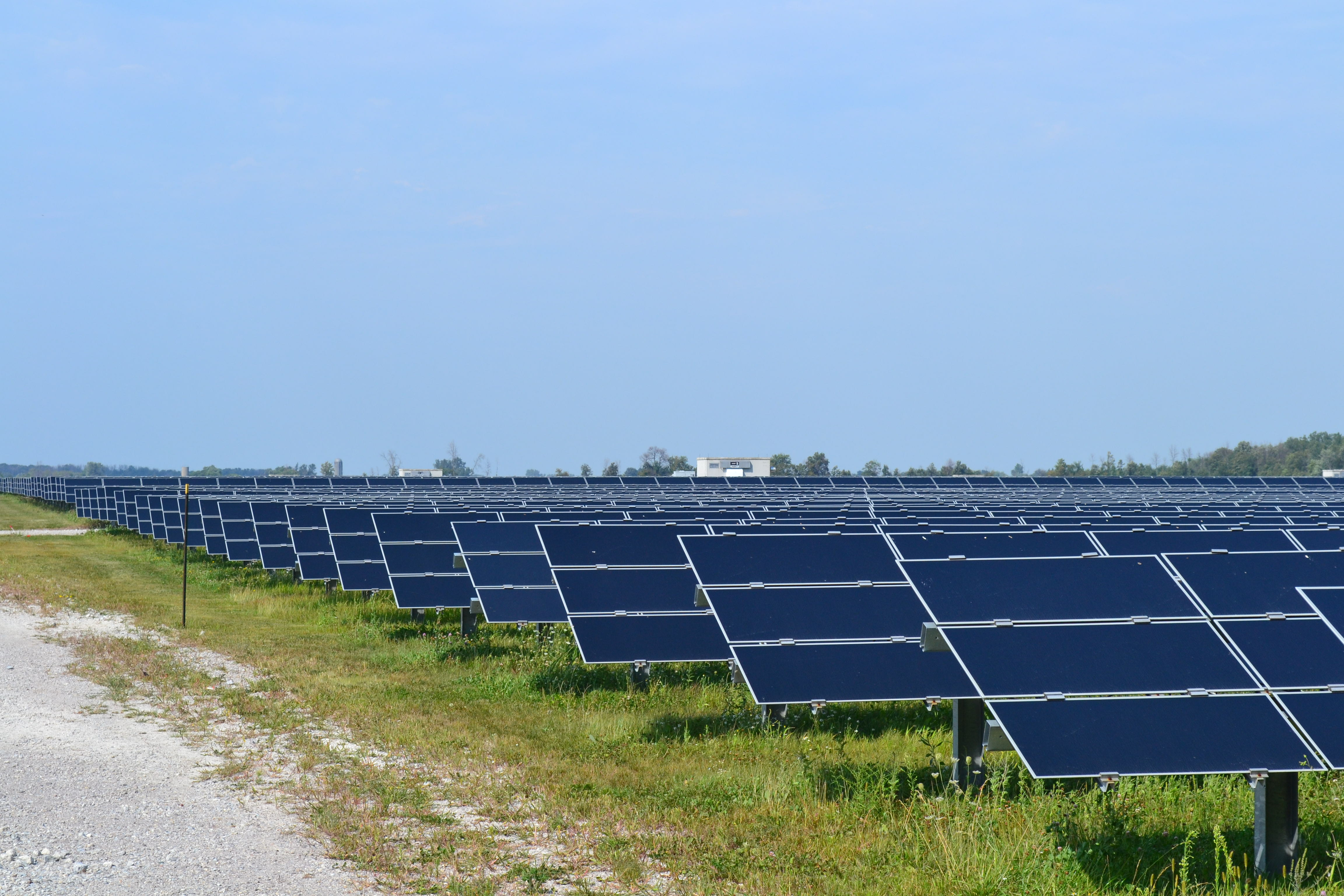
- Official name: Sarnia Solar Project
- Country: Canada
- Location: Sarnia, Ontario
- Coordinates: 42°56′16″N 82°20′30″W
- Status: Operational
- Commission date: December 2009
- Construction cost: $400 Million
- Owner: Enbridge
- Operators: First Solar O&M

Solar farm
- Type: Flat-panel PV
- Site area: 450 hectares (1,100 acres)

Power generation
- Units operational: 1,300,000
- Nameplate capacity: 80 MW_{AC}
- Capacity factor: 17.1%
- Annual net output: 120 GWh

External links
- Commons: Related media on Commons

Sarnia Photovoltaic Power Plant near Sarnia, Ontario, is Canada's largest photovoltaic plant with an installed capacity of 97 MW_{P} (80 MW_{AC}).

In 2009, Ontario introduced a feed-in tariff renewable energy payments program paying up to CDN 44.3 cents per kW·h for large ground arrays such as the Sarnia plant. This makes Ontario's one of the top feed in tariff programs in the world.

Phase I (for 20 MW) was completed in December 2009. Phase II (60 MW) was completed in September 2010 at a cost of C$300 million. The project was developed by Enbridge.

First Solar developed, engineered, and constructed the facility, and it will operate the Sarnia Solar Project for Enbridge under a long-term contract. Enbridge will sell the power output of the facility to the Ontario Power Authority pursuant to 20-year power purchase agreements under the terms of the Ontario government's Renewable Energy Standard Offer Program.

The plant covers 450 hectares (1,100 acres) and contains about 257 ha (635 acres) of modules, which is about 1.3 million thin-film panels. At the completion of Phase II it was the largest solar power station in the world, a title it held until the 2011 opening of Huanghe Hydropower Golmud Solar Park in China. The expected annual energy yield is about 120,000 MW·h, which if produced in a coal-fired plant, would require emission of 39,000 tonnes of CO_{2}.

Timeline of the largest PV power stations in the world
Year^{(a)}	Name of PV power station	Country	Capacity MW
1982	Lugo	United States	1
1985	Carrisa Plain	United States	5.6
2005	Bavaria Solarpark (Mühlhausen)	Germany	6.3
2006	Erlasee Solar Park	Germany	11.4
2008	Olmedilla Photovoltaic Park	Spain	60
2010	Sarnia Photovoltaic Power Plant	Canada	97
2011	Huanghe Hydropower Golmud Solar Park	China	200
2012	Agua Caliente Solar Project	United States	290
2014	Topaz Solar Farm^{(b)}	United States	550
2015	Longyangxia Dam Solar Park	China	850
2016	Tengger Desert Solar Park	China	1547
2019	Pavagada Solar Park	India	2050
2020	Bhadla Solar Park	India	2245
2024	Midong Solar Park	China	3500
Also see list of photovoltaic power stations and list of notable solar parks (a) year of final commissioning (b) capacity given in MW_{AC} otherwise in MW_{DC}

== See also ==
- List of solar farms in Canada
