= Bavaria Solarpark =

Solar power plant in Germany

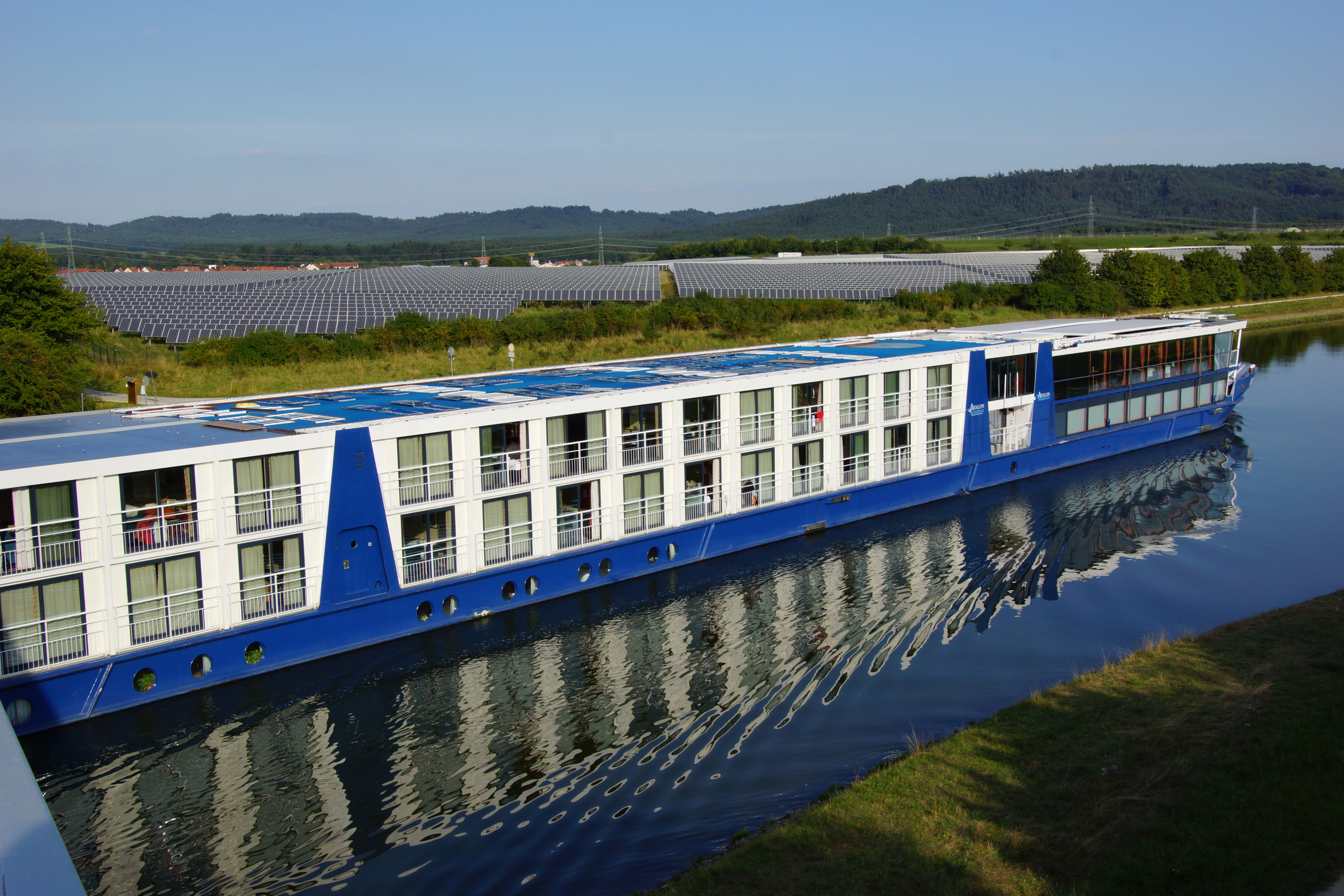
- An Avalon Waterways river cruise ship passing in front of the Bavaria Solarpark
- Country: Germany
- Location: Neumarkt in der Oberpfalz, Bavaria
- Coordinates: 49°9′30″N 11°26′0″E
- Status: Operational
- Construction began: December 2004
- Commission date: June 2005
- Owner: Deutsche Structured Finance (DSF)
- Operator: SunPower

Solar farm
- Type: Flat-panel PV
- Site area: 40 ha (98.8 acres)

Power generation
- Units operational: 57,600
- Nameplate capacity: 10.08 MW
- Annual net output: 10.85 GWh

The Bavaria Solarpark is a group of three photovoltaic power stations in different locations in Germany. Its total capacity amounts to 10 megawatts (MW) and consists of the following distinct solar farms south of Neumarkt in der Oberpfalz, in Bavaria:

- The 6.3 MW Solarpark Mühlhausen
- The 1.9 MW Solarpark Günching
- The 1.9 MW Solarpark Minihof

The Bavaria Solarpark was constructed and is operated by the American company SunPower. It consists of 57,600 solar panels (model PowerLight NT-5AE3D by Sharp) mounted on SunPower's solar trackers and covers a total area of 40 hectares (99 acres). Inaugurated on 30 June 2005, the solar farm was grid-connected six months later in December 2005. For a few months, the Solarpark Mühlhausen was the world's largest photovoltaic power station.

Timeline of the largest PV power stations in the world
Year^{(a)}	Name of PV power station	Country	Capacity MW
1982	Lugo	United States	1
1985	Carrisa Plain	United States	5.6
2005	Bavaria Solarpark (Mühlhausen)	Germany	6.3
2006	Erlasee Solar Park	Germany	11.4
2008	Olmedilla Photovoltaic Park	Spain	60
2010	Sarnia Photovoltaic Power Plant	Canada	97
2011	Huanghe Hydropower Golmud Solar Park	China	200
2012	Agua Caliente Solar Project	United States	290
2014	Topaz Solar Farm^{(b)}	United States	550
2015	Longyangxia Dam Solar Park	China	850
2016	Tengger Desert Solar Park	China	1547
2019	Pavagada Solar Park	India	2050
2020	Bhadla Solar Park	India	2245
2024	Midong Solar Park	China	3500
Also see list of photovoltaic power stations and list of notable solar parks (a) year of final commissioning (b) capacity given in MW_{AC} otherwise in MW_{DC}

== See also ==
- Photovoltaic power stations
- Solar power in Germany
