= List of photovoltaic power stations in Canada =

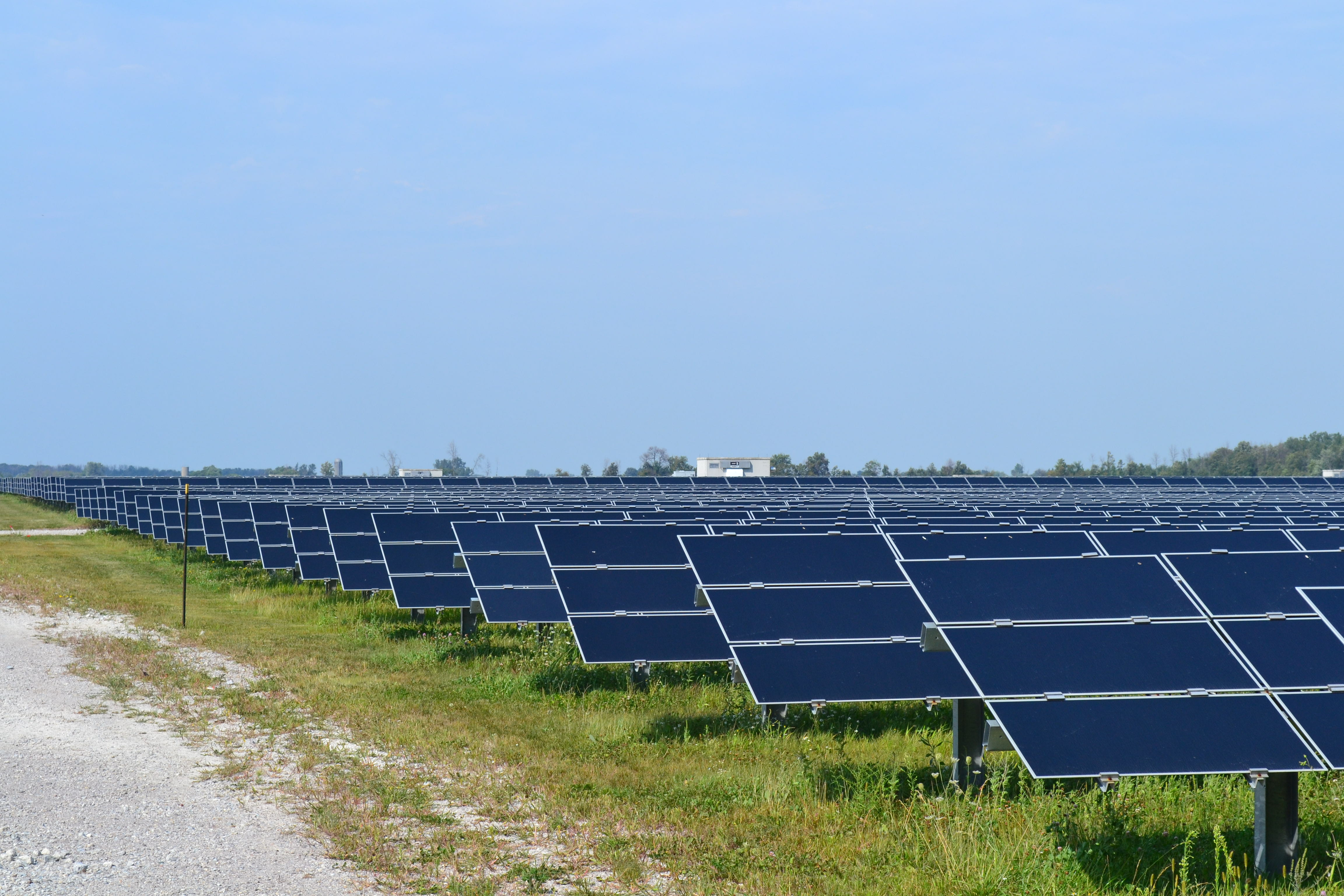
Sarnia Photovoltaic Power Plant, a solar farm in Canada

This is a list of photovoltaic power stations in Canada with a nameplate capacity of 10 MW or more.

== Photovoltaic power stations ==
Name	Province	Coordinates	Capacity (MW_{AC})	Owner	Year	Ref
Abitibi Solar Project	Ontario	Cochrane	10	Northland Power	2015	
Amherstburg Solar	Ontario	Amherstburg	20	Capstone Infrastructure	2011	
Amherstburg II	Ontario	Amherstburg	10	Alterra, GE Energy	2011	
Arnprior	Ontario	45°24′30″N 76°16′30″W	23.4	EDF Renewables	2009	
Barlow Solar	Ontario	Cornwall	10	EDF Renewables	2019	
Belleville North Solar Project	Ontario	Belleville	10	Northland Power	2013	
Belleville South Solar Project	Ontario	Belleville	10	Northland Power	2013	
Belmont	Ontario	42°53′35″N 81°07′01″W	20	Alterra, GE Energy	2013	
Burk's Falls East Solar Project	Ontario	Armour	10	Northland Power	2013	
Burk's Falls West Solar Project	Ontario	Ryerson	10	Northland Power	2014	
Crosby Solar Project	Ontario	Rideau Lakes	10	Northland Power	2013	
Elmsley	Ontario	44°50′54″N 76°04′09″W	24	EDF Renewables	2010	
Empire Solar Project	Ontario	Cochrane	10	Northland Power	2015	
Glendale Solar Project	Ontario	South Glengarry	10	Northland Power	2014	
Grand Renewable Solar Project	Ontario	42°53′04″N 79°48′28″W	100	Samsung C&T, CCLI, SNGRDC	2015	
Kingston Solar Project	Ontario	Kingston	100	Samsung Renewable Energy Inc.	2015	
Lily Lake Solar Farm	Ontario	Peterborough	10	Lily Lake Solar Inc.	2011	
Liskeard	Ontario	47°30′12″N 79°42′41″W	30	TC Energy	2014	
Long Lake Solar Project	Ontario	Cochrane	10	Northland Power	2015	
Loyalist	Ontario	44°20′35″N 76°58′38″W	54	Loyalist Solar LP	2019	
Martin's Meadow Solar Project	Ontario	Cochrane	10	Northland Power	2015	
McCann Solar Project	Ontario	Rideau Lakes	10	Northland Power	2013	
Moore	Ontario	42°52′09″N 82°25′16″W	20	First Solar, NextEra Energy	2012	
Nanticoke	Ontario	42°48′0″N 80°3′1″W	44	OPG, SNGRDC, MCFN	2019	
North Burgess Solar Project	Ontario	Tay Valley	10	Northland Power	2014	
Pendleton Solar	Ontario	Curran	12	EDF Renewables	2019	
Rainy River	Ontario	48°42′26″N 94°15′04″W	25	RRFN, CCLI, Terrma	2015	
Rideau Lakes	Ontario	44°40′33″N 76°16′50″W	10	Northland Power	2013	
Sarnia	Ontario	42°56′16″N 82°20′30″W	80	Enbridge, First Solar	2009	
Sault Ste. Marie	Ontario	46°32′16″N 84°26′16″W	58.7	Innergex Renewable Energy Inc.	2011	
Sombra	Ontario	42°42′41″N 82°27′43″W	20	Cordelio Power and Axium Infrastructure	2012	
Southgate	Ontario	44°06′07″N 80°44′58″W	50	Samsung C&T, CCLI	2016	
Stardale	Ontario	45°30′03″N 74°31′42″W	33	Innergex	2012	
Walpole	Ontario	42°56′16″N 80°08′41″W	20	Alterra, GE Energy	2013	
Windsor	Ontario	42°16′30″N 82°56′15″W	50	Samsung C&T, CCLI	2016	
Barlow Solar (BLS1)	Alberta	Calgary	27	ATCO	2022	
Brooks Solar (BSC1)	Alberta	Brooks, Alberta	15	Elemental Energy	2017	
Brooks Solar 1 (BRK1)	Alberta	Brooks, Alberta	13	Elemental Energy	2022	
Brooks Solar 2 (BRK2)	Alberta	Brooks, Alberta	14	Elemental Energy	2022	
Burdett (BRD1)	Alberta	Forty Mile County No. 8	11	Enbridge	2021	
Burdett (BUR1)	Alberta	Forty Mile County No. 8	20	BluEarth Renewables	2021	
Chappice Lake (CHP1)	Alberta	Cypress County	14	Elemental Energy	2023	
Claresholm 1 (CLR1)	Alberta	Municipal District of Willow Creek No. 26	58	Capstone, Obton A/S	2021	
Claresholm 2 (CLR2)	Alberta	50°01′09″N 113°24′07″W	75	Capstone, Obton A/S	2021	
Clydesdale 1 (CLY1)	Alberta	Municipal District of Taber	41	Capital Power	2022	
Clydesdale 2 (CLY2)	Alberta	Municipal District of Taber	34	Capital Power	2022	
Coaldale (COL1)	Alberta	Lethbridge County	23	ACFN, Concord Green Energy	2022	
Conrad 1 (CRD1)	Alberta	49.5226°N 112.0272°W	23	Conrad Solar Inc	2022	
Conrad 2 (CRD2)	Alberta	49.5226°N 112.0272°W	18	Conrad Solar Inc	2022	
Deerfoot Solar Park (DFT1)	Alberta	Calgary	37	DP Energy	2023	
East Strathmore Namaka (NMK1)	Alberta	Wheatland County, Alberta	20	Elemental Energy	2022	
Empress Solar Park (EMP1)	Alberta	Empress	39	Achernar GP Ltd	2023	
Fox Coulee Solar (FCS1)	Alberta	Starland County	93	Neoen	2023	
Hays (HYS1)	Alberta	Municipal District of Taber	23	BluEarth Renewables	2021	
Hull (HUL1)	Alberta	Municipal District of Taber	25	Solar Krafte	2020	
Innisfail (INF1)	Alberta	Red Deer County	22	Elemental Energy	2020	
Jenner (JER1)	Alberta	Special Area No. 2	23	BluEarth Renewables, Conklin Métis Local 193	2021	
Joffre Solar 1 (JFS1)	Alberta	Joffre	25	PACE Canada LP	2023	
Joffre Solar 2 (JFS2)	Alberta	Joffre	22	PACE Canada LP	2023	
kīsikāw pīsim 1 and 2 (KKP1, KKP2)	Alberta	Edmonton	14	Epcor	2022	
Kneehill Solar (TRH1)	Alberta	Kneehill County	25	Capstone Infrastructure	2022	
Michichi Creek (MCH1)	Alberta	Drumheller	13	Concord Green Energy	2023	
Michichi Solar (MIC1)	Alberta	Starland County	25	Capstone Infrastructure	2022	
Monarch (MON1)	Alberta	Lethbridge County	24	Concord Green Energy	2022	
Spring Coulee (SGC1)	Alberta	Spring Coulee	30	Solar Krafte	2023	
Stavely (STV1)	Alberta	Stavely	17	Concord Stavely Partnership	2023	
Strathmore 1 (STR1)	Alberta	Strathmore	18	Capital Power	2022	
Strathmore 2 (STR2)	Alberta	Strathmore	23	Capital Power	2022	
Suffield (SUF1)	Alberta	Cypress County	23	Canadian Solar	2020	
Travers (TVS1)	Alberta	Vulcan County	465	Greengate Power Corporation, Copenhagen Infrastructure Partners	2022	
Vauxhall (VXH1)	Alberta	Municipal District of Taber	22	Solar Krafte	2020	
Vulcan (VCN1)	Alberta	Vulcan County	22	ACFN, Concord Green Energy	2022	
Westfield Yellow Lake (WEF1)	Alberta	Forty Mile County No. 8	19	BluEarth Renewables	2021	
Wheatcrest (WCR1)	Alberta	Taber	50	BluEarth Renewables	2023	
Youngstown Solar (YNG1)	Alberta	Youngstown	6	PACE Canada LP	2023	
Summerside Solar Energy Farm	Prince Edward Island	Summerside	21	Samsung Renewable Energy INC; City of Summerside	2022	
Highfield Solar Energy Facility	Saskatchewan	Rural Municipality of Coulee No. 136	10	Saturn Power	2021	
Pesâkâstêw Solar Facility	Saskatchewan	Weyburn	10	Pesâkâstêw Solar Limited Partnership	2022	
Awasis Solar Facility	Saskatchewan	Regina, Saskatchewan	10	Cowessess First Nation, Elemental Energy	2022	

=== See also ===
- List of power stations in Canada by type
- List of photovoltaic power stations
