= Rote Jahne Solar Park =

Solar power installation in Saxony, Germany

- Country: Germany
- Coordinates: 51°30′29″N 12°40′56″E

Solar farm
- Type: Standard PV

The Rote Jahne Solar Park in Saxony, Germany, has a total output capacity of 6 megawatts peak (MWp). Built at a former military airfield, it has 90,000 First Solar thin-film modules covering approximately 6.7 hectares, and produces approximately 5.7 million kilowatt-hours (kW·h) of solar electricity every year. The project cost around Euro 21 million or US$28 million.

== See also ==
- Photovoltaic power stations
- Solar power in Germany
