= Krughütte Solar Park =

Photovoltaic power station in Eisleben, Germany

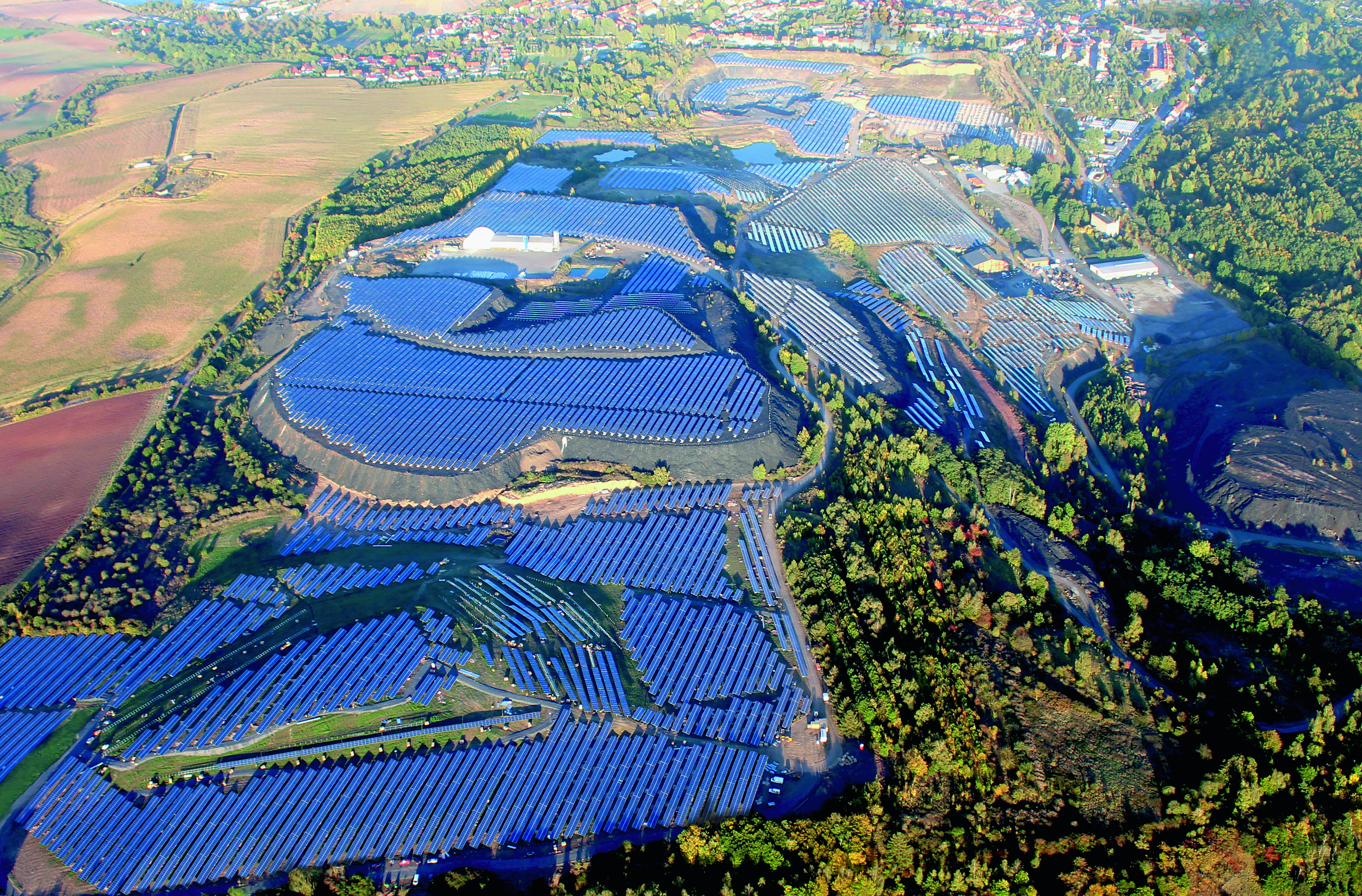
- Krughütte Solar Park
- Country: Germany
- Location: Eisleben
- Coordinates: 51°31′37″N 11°31′14″E
- Commission date: 2012

Solar farm
- Type: Flat-panel PV
- Site area: 100 ha (247 acres)

Power generation
- Units operational: 121,000
- Nameplate capacity: 29.1 MW_{p}

The Krughütte Solar Park is a 29.1-megawatt (MW) photovoltaic power station in Eisleben, Germany.

The solar farm is located in the state of Saxony-Anhalt and was developed and constructed by German project developers SRU Solar AG, Berga and Parabel AG, Berlin, who continue to operate the farm. It was constructed on the site of a former copper mine, and at over 100 hectares (247 acres) is one of the largest projects in the region.

== See also ==
- List of photovoltaic power stations
- PV system
- Solar power in Germany
- Electricity sector in Germany
