= Geiseltalsee Solarpark =

Photovoltaic power plant located in Merseburg, Germany

- Country: Germany
- Coordinates: 51°22′N 12°00′E

Solar farm
- Type: Standard PV

Geiseltalsee Solarpark, also known as Geiseltalsee, is a 4 MWp photovoltaic power plant located in Merseburg, Germany. The power plant was constructed by BP Solar using 24,864 BP solar modules. The power station was completed in 2004

== See also ==
- Photovoltaic power stations
- Solar power in Germany
