= Göttelborn Solar Park =

Photovoltaic power station in Saarland, Germany

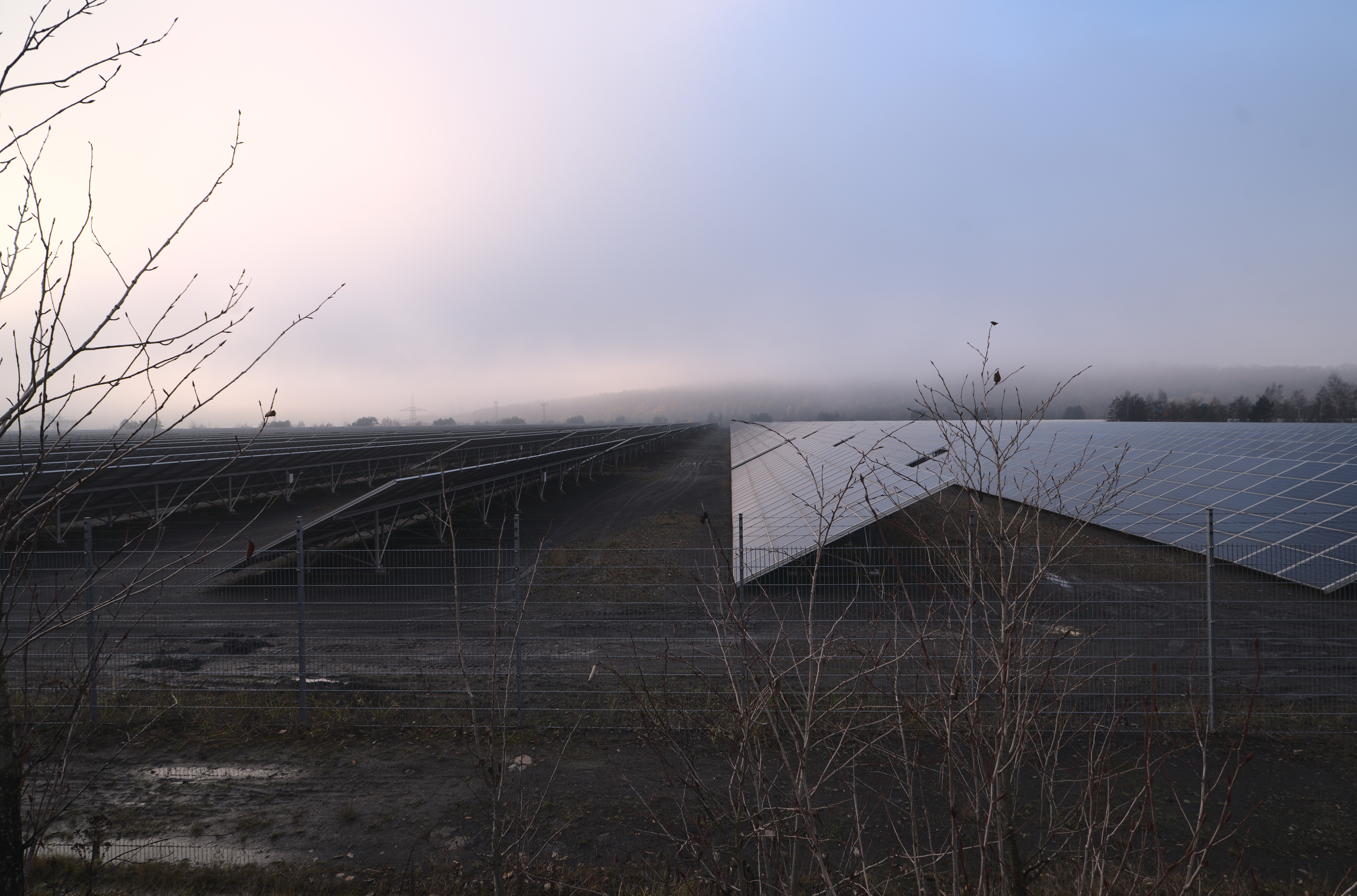
- Country: Germany
- Coordinates: 49.3393°N 7.0352°E

Power generation
- Nameplate capacity: 8.2 MW

External links
- Commons: Related media on Commons

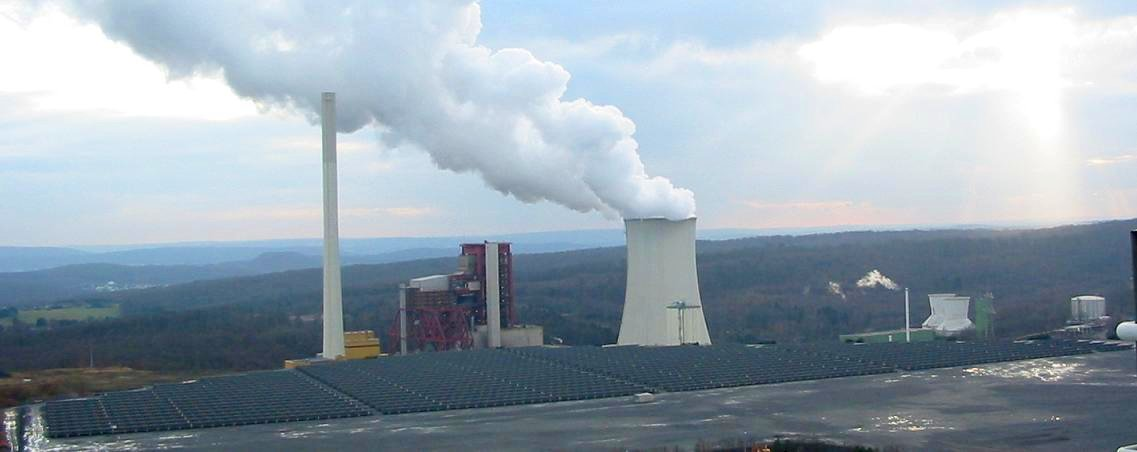
Solar park Göttelborn in front of coal-fired power plant "Weiher III"

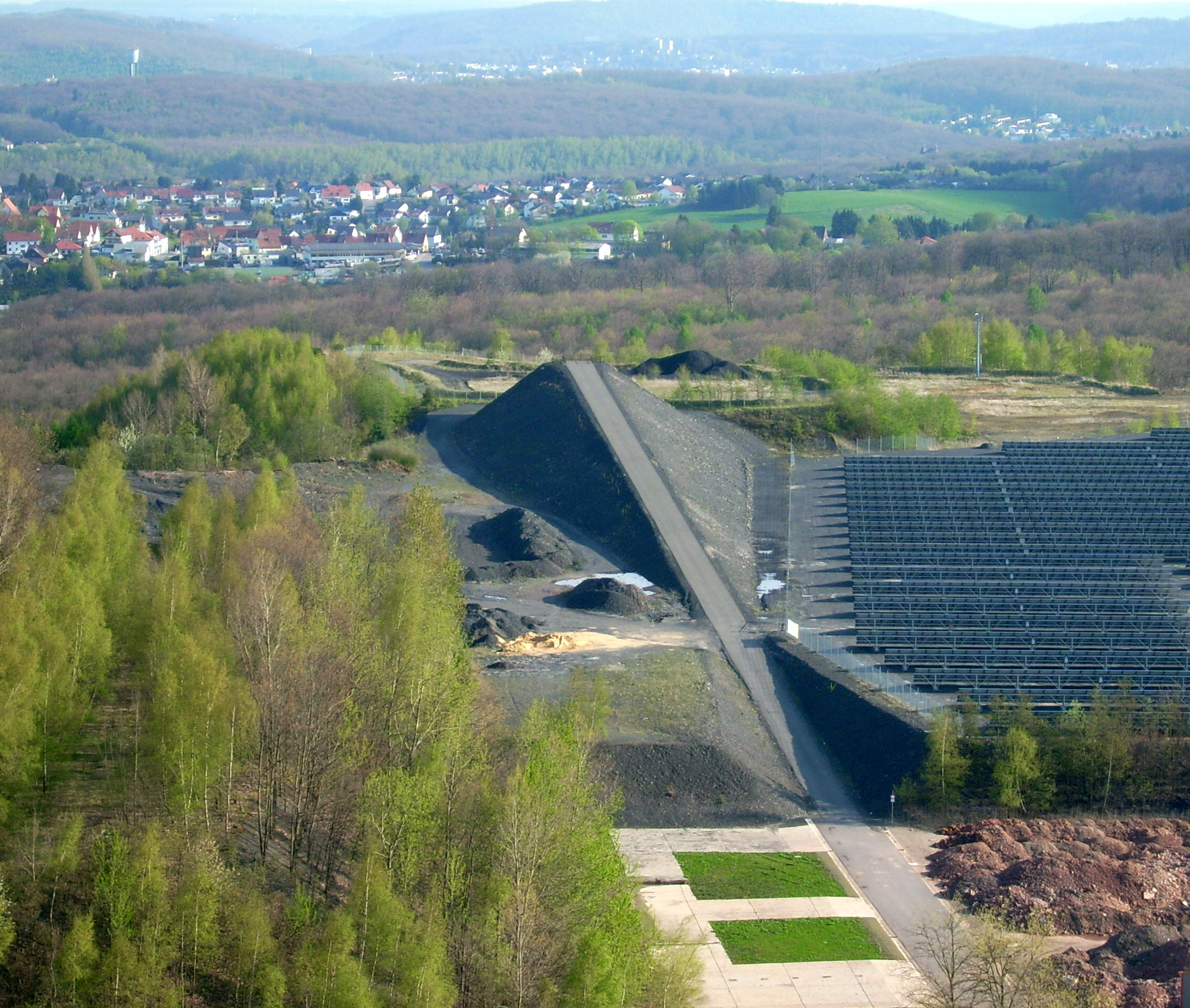
Viewing platform Himmelspfeil (heaven's arrow) at the edge of the solar park

Gottelborn Solar Park (German: Solarpark Zeche Göttelborn) is an 8.4-MW_{p} photovoltaic power station located in Göttelborn, in Quierschied municipality, Germany. The power plant was constructed by City Solar in two stages. The first stage was completed in August, 2004, followed by the second stage three years later in November 2007.

The first stage of the plant includes 23,500 solar modules from the French manufacturer "Photowatt" at an estimated efficiency of 14%, with a nominal power output of 4 MW_{p} and occupies a total area of 50,000 square metres (538,196 ft^{2}) The construction of the second stage required another 50,000 PV modules.

== See also ==
- Photovoltaic power stations
- Solar power in Germany
