= Travers Solar Project =

Solar power stations in Canada

- Official name: Travers Solar Project
- Country: Canada
- Location: Vulcan County, Alberta
- Coordinates: 50°15′16″N 112°43′51″W
- Status: Commissioned
- Construction began: June 2021
- Commission date: March 2022; 3 years ago
- Owner: Greengate Power

Solar farm
- Type: Flat-panel PV
- Site area: 13.35 km^{2} (3,300 acres)

Power generation
- Units operational: 1,500,000
- Nameplate capacity: 465 MW

External links
- Website: www.traverssolar.ca

The Travers Solar Project is a photovoltaic power station in Vulcan County, Alberta. After first production in March 2022, it became the largest photovoltaic power station in Canada with a nameplate capacity of 465 MW.

The project received a $500 million investment from the Denmark-based investment group Copenhagen Infrastructure Partners in February 2020. Construction began in June 2021.

== See also ==
- List of solar farms in Canada
