= Eggebek Solar Park =

Photovoltaic power station in Schleswig-Holstein, Germany

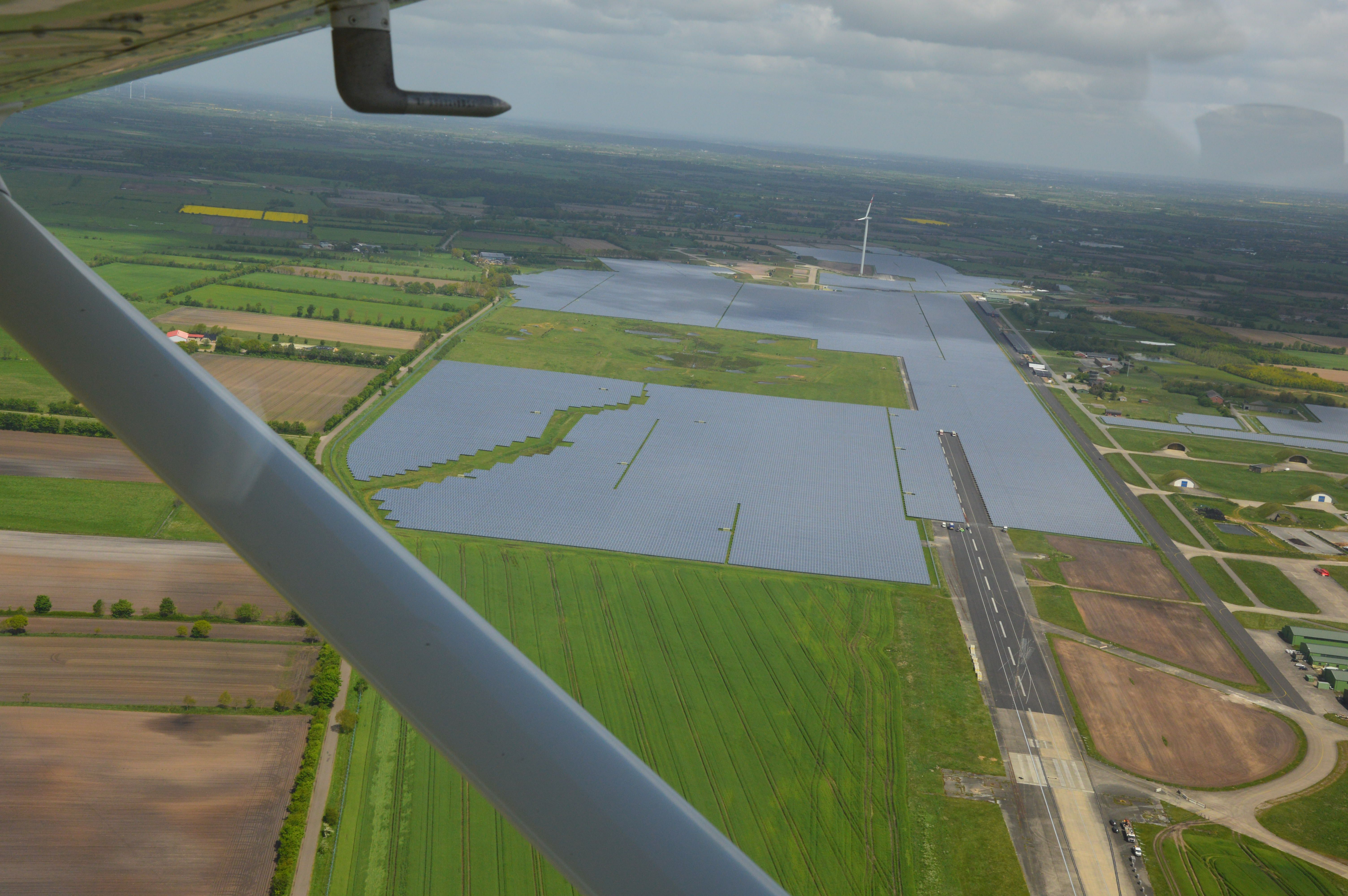
- Country: Germany
- Location: Eggebek
- Coordinates: 54°37′46″N 9°20′36″E
- Status: Operational
- Commission date: 2011
- Construction cost: €130 million
- Owner: Möhring Energie GmbH

Solar farm
- Type: Flat-panel PV

Power generation
- Nameplate capacity: 83.6 MW

The Eggebek Solar Park was Germany's largest photovoltaic power station when completed in August 2011, and one of the largest in the world. It is built on a 160 ha (400 acres) plot of land near the Eggebek municipality in Schleswig-Holstein state, Germany near the border with Denmark. The solar park has a power generation capacity of 83.6 MW and uses roughly 360,000 multicrystalline solar modules of the TSM-PC05 series produced by the Chinese company Trina Solar.

The solar park is built on the site of a former German Navy military base where the Naval Aviation Wing 2 was stationed until 2005.

== See also ==
- Energy policy of the European Union
- Photovoltaics
- Renewable energy commercialization
- Renewable energy in the European Union
