= Solarpark Alt Daber =

Photovoltaic power station in Brandenburg, Germany

- Country: Germany
- Location: Wittstock, Brandenburg
- Coordinates: 53°12′N 12°31′E
- Status: Operational
- Commission date: 3 December 2011
- Construction cost: €100 million

Solar farm
- Type: Flat-panel PV
- Site area: 133 hectares (329 acres)

Power generation
- Units operational: 850,000
- Nameplate capacity: 67.805,00 kW
- Annual net output: 71.4 GWh

The Solarpark Alt Daber is a photovoltaic facility in Germany generating 67.8 megawatts (MW, 90,900 hp). It was completed 3 December 2011, for a cost of €100 million, and is expected to produce 71 GWh/year. It is on a former military airport.

In 2014 a prototype of a battery storage system was added, mainly to provide frequency-response.

== See also ==
- Energy policy of the European Union
- Photovoltaics
- Renewable energy commercialization
- Renewable energy in the European Union
