= Templin Solar Park =

Photovoltaic power station in Germany

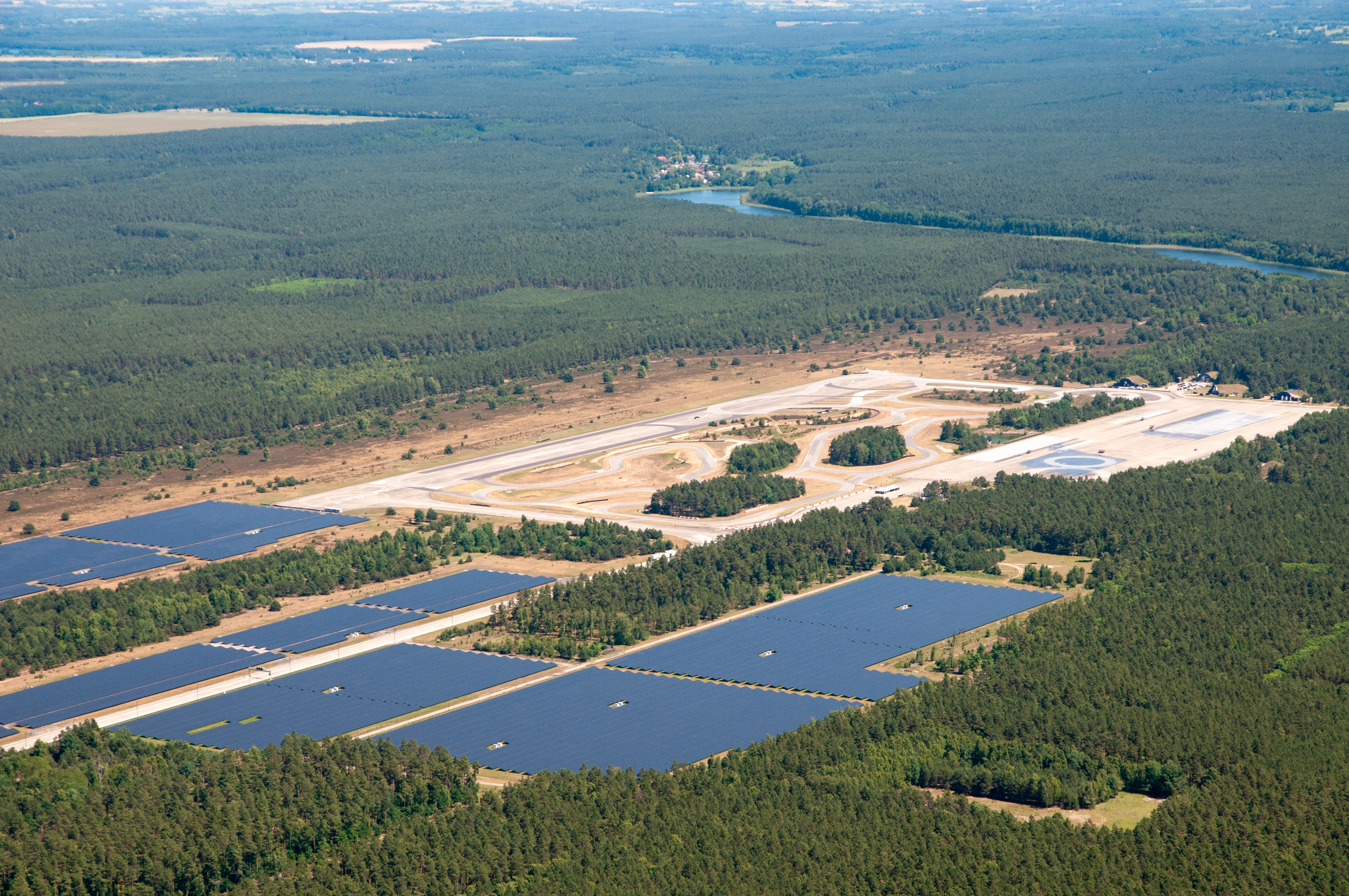
- Country: Germany
- Location: Templin, Uckermark, Brandenburg
- Coordinates: 53°02′N 13°32′E
- Status: Operational
- Commission date: 30 September 2012
- Construction cost: €205 million
- Owner: Commerz Real

Solar farm
- Type: Flat-panel PV
- Site area: 214 ha

Power generation
- Units operational: 1,500,000
- Nameplate capacity: 128.48 MW

Templin Solar Park is a 128 megawatt (MW) photovoltaic power station, located at the former Templin military airport.

== History ==
The plant was built between 5 June and 30 September 2012. The electrical connection to the 110 kV network, via two substations operated by e.dis AG, was made in April 2013. The plant covers an area of approximately 214 ha. It consists of 1.5 million thin-film modules from the manufacturer First Solar from its factory in Frankfurt (Oder). The 114 power inverters used were supplied by German company SMA. The park was built by Bavarian company Belectric. The construction costs were €204.5 million and about 500 people were employed during its fabrication.

== See also ==
- Photovoltaic power stations
- List of largest power stations in the world
- List of photovoltaic power stations
