= Tutow Solar Park =

Solar power plant in Demmin, Germany

- Country: Germany
- Location: Demmin
- Coordinates: 53°55′17″N 13°13′09″E
- Status: Operational
- Commission date: 2009-2011

Solar farm
- Type: Flat-panel PV
- Site area: 22 ha (54.4 acres); Site plan

Power generation
- Nameplate capacity: 52 MW

The Tutow Solar Park is in Demmin, Germany, and is located at Tutow Airport.

The first phase of the project, Tutow I was commissioned in 2009, using 91,200 First Solar thin film modules, with a total rating of 6782 kWp, and was expected to produce 6.7 GWh per year. The second, Tutow II, brought the total to 25.4 MWp, about four times larger, in 2010, and was expected to produce 26 GWh/year using a total of 335,400 panels, and the third section, Tutow III, making the total 52 MWp, was completed in 2011.

== See also ==
- Photovoltaic power station
- List of largest power stations in the world
