= Lieberose Photovoltaic Park =

Photovoltaic power plant in Lieberose, Brandenburg, Germany

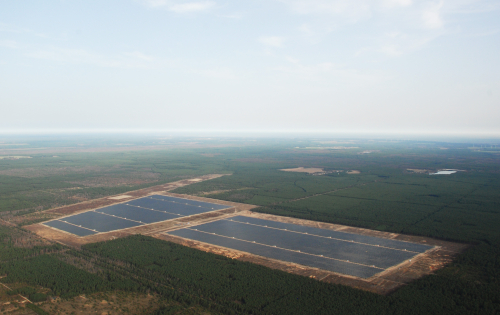
- Country: Germany
- Coordinates: 51°55′55″N 14°24′26″E
- Status: Operational
- Construction cost: US$238 million
- Owner: Juwi Group

Solar farm
- Type: Flat-panel PV

Power generation
- Units operational: 900,000
- Nameplate capacity: 70.8 MW

The Lieberose Photovoltaic Park is a 70.8-megawatt (MW) photovoltaic power plant in Lieberose, Brandenburg, Germany. The solar park with 900,000 solar panels which went fully on line in October 2009, and will supply electricity for 15,000 households a year while reducing the use of pollution-generating fossil fuels. The Lieberose Solar Park cost $238-million and is operated by the Juwi Group, which has a 20-year contract on the land.

== See also ==
- Photovoltaic power stations
- List of photovoltaic power stations in 2011
