= Walddrehna Solar Park =

Photovoltaic power station in Germany

- Country: Germany
- Location: Walddrehna, Brandenburg
- Coordinates: 51°46′N 13°36′E
- Status: Operational
- Commission date: 2012
- Construction cost: €70 million
- Owner: Enerparc

Solar farm
- Type: Flat-panel PV

Power generation
- Units operational: 210,000
- Nameplate capacity: 52.284 MW
- Annual net output: 52 GWh

The Walddrehna Solar Park is a 52.284 MW photovoltaic power station, which is located in Walddrehna, Brandenburg, Germany, on a former military base.

== See also ==
- List of photovoltaic power stations
