= Tengger Desert Solar Park =

Photovoltaic power station in Zhongwei, Ningxia, China

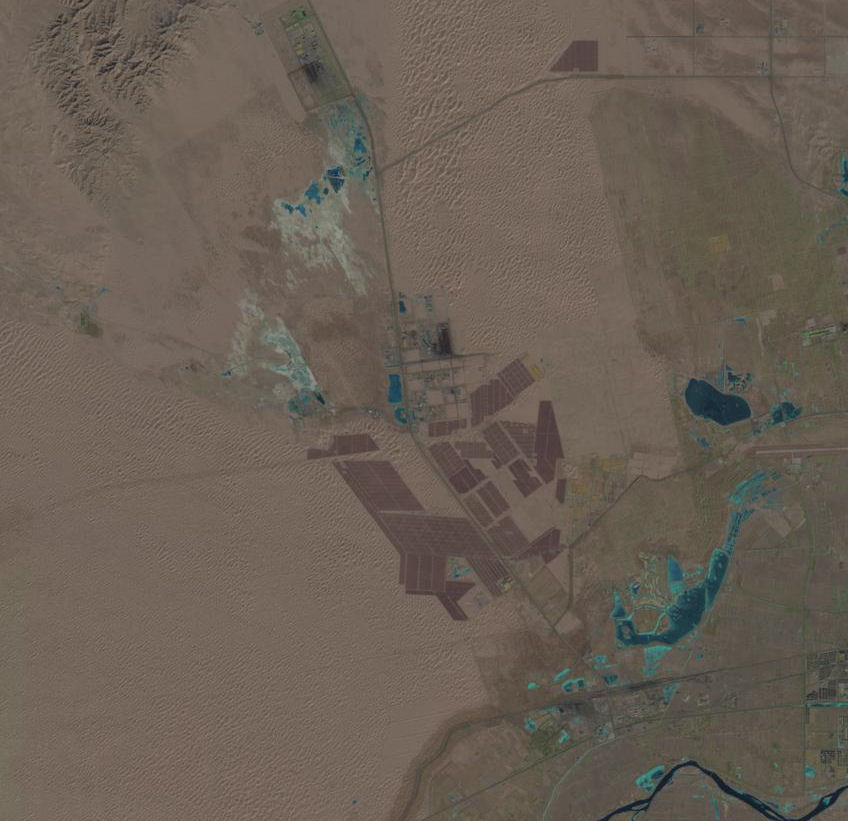
- Country: China
- Coordinates: 37°33′43.2″N 105°2′28.68″E
- Status: Operational

Solar farm
- Type: Standard PV

Power generation
- Nameplate capacity: 1.547 GW

External links
- Commons: Related media on Commons

Tengger Desert Solar Park is the sixth-largest photovoltaic plant in the world as of December, 2021. It is located in Zhongwei, Ningxia, China. It covers an area of 43 km^{2}. In 2018, it was the solar park with the largest peak power capacity (1,547 MW).

== See also ==
- List of photovoltaic power stations
- List of power stations in China
- Solar power in China
