= Olmedilla Photovoltaic Park =

Power plant in Spain

- Official name: Parque Fotovoltaico Olmedilla de Alarcón
- Country: Spain
- Location: Olmedilla de Alarcón
- Coordinates: 39°37′43″N 2°04′37″W
- Status: Operational
- Commission date: July 2008
- Construction cost: €384 million

Solar farm
- Type: Flat-panel PV

Power generation
- Units operational: 270,000
- Nameplate capacity: 60 MW_{p}
- Annual net output: 87.5 GWh

External links
- Website: www.nobesol.com

The Olmedilla Photovoltaic Park is a 60-megawatt (MW) photovoltaic power plant, located in Olmedilla de Alarcón, Spain. When completed in July 2008, it was the world's largest power plant using photovoltaic technology.

The plant employs more than 270,000 conventional solar panels, using solar cells made of conventional crystalline silicon. Olmedilla generates about 87,500 megawatt-hours per year, equivalent to the annual power use of 40,000 homes. Construction of the plant cost €384 million (US$530 million).

In 2026, a grid battery with power output of nearly 30 MW and storage capacity of 60 MWh started operating at Olmedilla.

== See also ==
- List of photovoltaic power stations
