= Pavagada Solar Park =

Solar park in Karnataka, India

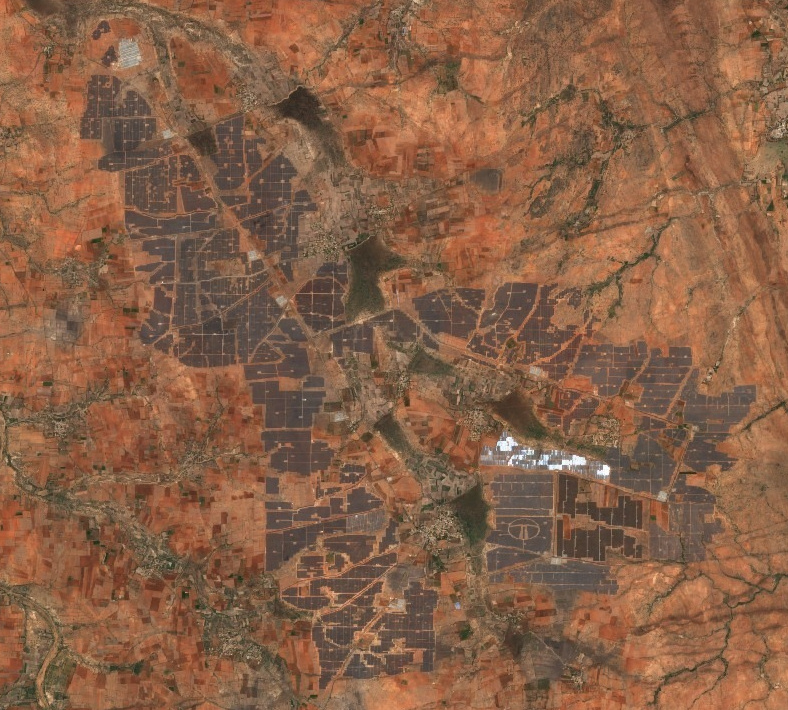
- Official name: Shakti Sthala
- Country: India
- Location: Pavagada taluk, Tumkur district, Karnataka
- Coordinates: 14.25°N 77.45°E
- Status: Operational
- Construction began: October 2016
- Commission date: March 2018
- Construction cost: ₹14,425 crore
- Owner: Karnataka Solar Power Development Corporation Ltd. (KSPDCL)

Solar farm
- Type: Flat-panel PV
- Site resource: 5.5-6.0 kWh/m^{2} per day
- Site area: 13,000 acres (5,300 ha)

Power generation
- Units operational: 2,050 MW
- Nameplate capacity: 2,050 MW

External links
- Website: kspdcl.in
- Commons: Related media on Commons

Shakti Sthala (Energy Space), also called Pavagada Solar Park is a solar park covering an area of 53 square kilometres (13,000 acres) in Pavagada taluk, Tumkur district, Karnataka. Completed in 2019, the park has a capacity of 2,050 MW. As of April 2021, it is the world's third largest photovoltaic solar park after the 2,245 MW Bhadla Solar Park in Rajasthan and 2,200 MW Huanghe Hydropower Hainan Solar Park in China. It is the second largest in India.The total project cost was ₹14,800 crore (US$2.1 billion).

== History ==
=== Background ===
Karnataka Renewable Energy Development Ltd (KREDL) and the Solar Energy Corporation of India (SECI) established a joint venture company, the Karnataka Solar Power Development Corporation Ltd (KSPDCL), in March 2015 to implement solar power projects in Karnataka. The Chairman of the State High Level Clearance Committee (SLHCC) approved the KSPDCL's proposal to construct a solar power park in Pavagada taluk on 29 October 2015. The project is spread over a total area of 13,000 acres (53 km^{2}) which includes the 5 villages of Balasamudra, Tirumani, Kyataganacharlu, Vallur and Rayacharlu.

Pavagada was chosen as the site for the project for several reasons. Apart from high solar radiation and availability of land, the region receives very little rainfall. Pavagada taluk is located in a semi-arid tract, atop an elevated plateau surrounded by rocky hills. The region has been declared drought hit by the Karnataka Government 54 times in the past 6 decades. The region is also sparsely populated and most of its residents are poor farmers. Many of the region's residents have migrated to Bangalore, located about 180 km away, for economic reasons.

G.V. Balram, the managing director of KREDL, was born and raised in a village in Pavaguda taluk. He understood that farmers in the region were reluctant to sell their land due to emotional reasons. In order to aid in the development of the region and reduce economic migration, Balram offered farmers the option to lease the land required for the project rather than purchase it outright. Landowners receive an annual payment of ₹21,000 (US$220) per acre under the terms of the lease which is valid for 25–35 years. For the entire land required for the park, the total compensation for the entire project amounts to ₹23-25 crore per year. The annual payment amount will increase by 5% every 2 years.

=== Auctions ===
The KSPDCL utilized the "plug and play" model to implement the project. Under this model, the company acquires blocks of land, obtains all required government approvals for solar power generation, and then awards contracts to solar power developers (SPDs) through auctions.

In April 2016, NTPC Limited, on behalf of KSPDCL, awarded contracts to 6 firms for the commissioning of a total of 500 MW of power at the Pavaguda Solar Park as follows:

- Parampujya Solar Energy Pvt Ltd. = 100 MW at ₹4.79 per unit
- Fortum Finnsurya Energy Pvt Ltd. = 100 MW at ₹4.79 per unit
- ACME Solar Holdings Pvt Ltd. = 100 MW at ₹4.79 per unit
- Tata Power Renewable Energy Ltd = 100 MW at ₹4.79 per unit
- Yarrow Infrastructure = 50 MW at ₹4.78 (5.0¢ US) per unit (lowest)
- Renew Power = 50 MW at ₹4.80 (5.0¢ US) per unit (highest)

Work on the solar park began in October 2016. In March 2017, the NTPC invited bids for a further 750 MW, split into six blocks of 125 MW each. Due to infrastructure issues, this invitation was scrapped and the capacity was retendered in early 2017, with an additional 250 MW (total 1000 MW) which was reserved for "domestic content requirement" scheme, meaning that the components needed to be manufactured in India and not imported.

- In May 2018, SB Energy has secured 200 megawatts of capacity at Rs 2.82/kWh, or 4.16¢/kWh offered by SECI.
- The most recent letter of award (LoA) was given to Amar Raja Power Systems Limited, to construct 50 MW of capacity at a levelized tariff of ₹1.24 (~$1.7¢)/kWh for 24 years. The reason for the extremely low cost was quoted as 'land being available to KREDL at no cost and the availability of the power evacuation infrastructure up to the sub-station.'

=== Commissioning ===
On 14 December 2017, Fortum announced that it had connected a 100MW solar plant at Pavagada to the grid. Tata Power Renewable Energy Ltd commissioned 100 MW at the park by 19 December, and an additional 50 MW by 2 January 2018. 600 MW of power was commissioned by 31 January 2018. and a further 1,400 MW are planned.

Pavagada Solar Park had a total commissioned capacity of 1,400 MW by 9 April 2019 out of total 2,050 MW planned by December 2019. Another 450 MW was commissioned by November 2019 taking the total project capacity to 1850 MW, making it the largest solar power plant in the world at the time.

Upon completion, Pavagada Solar Park was the world’s largest solar power plant. However, as of April 2021, it was the third largest photovoltaic solar park after the 2245 MW Bhadla Solar Park in Rajasthan and Huanghe Hydropower Hainan Solar Park in China 2200 MW.

== Wind energy ==
In March 2017, Karnataka Energy Minister DK Shivakumar told the Bangalore Mirror that the government was looking to generate wind energy by setting up windmills in Pavagada. Preliminary estimates from the KREDL indicate a potential wind power generation of 250-300 MW.

== See also ==
- Ultra Mega Solar Power Projects
- List of photovoltaic power stations
