= List of power stations in Germany =

This page lists most of the power stations in the electricity sector in Germany. For traction current, see List of installations for 15 kV AC railway electrification in Germany, Austria and Switzerland.

== Coal, gas, oil, waste ==
As of July 2023, Germany still had 58 active coal power plants.

Name	Location	Coordinates	Capacity (MW)	Height of chimneys m / ft		Year	Fuel	Remarks
Ahrensfelde Power Plant	Ahrensfelde	52°35′23.0″N 13°33′31″E	152	27	89	1990 - 2020	Natural gas	
Altchemnitz Heating Power Station	Altchemnitz, Saxony	50°47′54.9″N 12°55′2.7″E	232	225	738	1972	Oil (until 1981), natural gas	
Altbach Power Station	Altbach, Baden-Württemberg	48°43′1.42″N 9°22′2.91″E; 48°43′2.77″N 9°22′26.82″E	1270	250	820		Coal	
Asdonkshof Waste Incineration Plant	Kamp-Lintfort, North Rhine-Westphalia	51°31′23.17″N 6°34′31.96″E	22 (98)	200	660	1995	Waste	
Baunatal Heating Power Plant	Kassel-Baunatal		42					
Bayer-Power Station Leverkusen	Leverkusen, North Rhine-Westphalia			220	720			used until 1944 as carrier for Bayer Cross Leverkusen
Bergkamen Power Station	Bergkamen, North Rhine-Westphalia	51°38′12.16″N 7°37′14.05″E	747	282	925	1981	Coal	
Berlin-Buch Power Plant	Berlin	52°38′6″N 13°30′37.17″E	5	120	390	1974		
Berlin-Charlottenburg Heating Power Plant	Berlin-Charlottenburg	52°31′19.76″N 13°18′31.18″E	215	104	341			
Berlin-Köpenick Power Plant	Berlin	52°26′7″N 13°34′54″E	10				Gas	
Berlin-Lichterfelde Power Plant	Berlin	52°25′29.81″N 13°18′35.4″E	300	158	518	1974	Gas	
Berlin-Moabit Heating Power Plant	Berlin-Moabit	52°32′15″N 13°20′45″E	150					
Berlin-Mitte Heating Power Plant	Berlin-Mitte	52°30′41.73″N 13°25′15.57″E	440	100	330			
Berlin-Reuter/West Power Plant	Berlin-Charlottenburg	52°32′4.45″N 13°14′40.32″E	600	122	400		Coal	Reuter West Power Plant
Berlin-Reutter	Berlin-Charlottenburg	52°31′51.89″N 13°14′44.49″E	165	122	400	1930	Waste	
Berlin-Wilmersdorf Heating Power Plant	Berlin-Mitte	52°28′53.89″N 13°18′28.32″E	330	102	335			
Berlin-Klingenberg Power Plant	Berlin	52°29′24.09″N 13°29′45.39″E	188	169	554			
Berlin-Lichtenberg Power Plant	Berlin	52°31′24.25″N 13°31′19.96″E	36	169	554			
Berrenrath Industrial Power Plant	Berrenrath	50°51′55.2″N 6°49′26.8″E	107					
Bexbach Power Station	Bexbach, Saarland	49°21′48.51″N 7°14′13.38″E	773	240	790		Coal	
Bochum Heating Power Plant	Bochum	51°27′5.69″N 7°13′10.73″E	21	130	430			
Boxberg Power Station	Boxberg, Saxony	51°24′53.95″N 14°33′41.76″E; 51°24′55″N 14°33′48.94″E; 51°24′57.17″N 14°34′0.18″E; 51°24′59.93″N 14°34′19.09″E	2575	300	980		Coal (lignite)	
Braunschweig-Mitte Heating Power Plant	Braunschweig, Lower Saxony	52°16′43.57″N 10°30′53.96″E	319	198	650	1983		
Bremen-Farge Power Plant	Bremen	53°12′7.65″N 8°30′57.96″E	343	150	490			
Bremen-Findorff Waste Incineration Plant	Bremen	53°6′51″N 8°49′1″E	15.3					
Unit 6 of Bremen-Hafen Power Station	Bremen	53°7′29.54″N 8°43′43.11″E	450	250	820		Coal	
Bremen-Hastedt Power Plant	Bremen	53°03′35.2″N 8°52′23.4″E	280					
Bremen-Mittelsbüren Power Plant	Bremen	53°07′44.33″N 8°41′0.22″E	280	197	646			also traction current
Bridge of Nossen Heating Power Plant	Dresden	51°02′30.47″N 13°42′29.6″E	270	80	260			
Buschhaus Power Station	Helmstedt, Lower Saxony	52°10′18.35″N 10°58′37.89″E	380	300	980	1984	Coal (lignite)	
Castrop-Rauxel Power Station	Castrop-Rauxel, North Rhine-Westphalia	51°34′49.37″N 7°18′49.19″E	290	230	750		Coal	
Power Plant Chemnitz	Chemnitz	50°51′28.01″N 12°55′25.79″E	195	308	1,010		Coal (lignite), gas, oil	
Cuno Power Station	Herdecke, North Rhine-Westphalia	51°24′15.41″N 7°24′49.09″E		240	790			
Dormagen Power Plant	Dormagen		410					
Dortmund-Derne Power Station	Dortmund-Derne, North Rhine-Westphalia	51°34′12.38″N 7°31′40.98″E		210	690		Coal	
Dresden-Reick Heating Power Station	Dresden-Reick, Saxony	51°1′28.14″N 13°46′59.78″E		204	669			
Datteln Power Station	Datteln	51°37′48.16″N 7°19′52.73″E	1100	180	590		Coal	also traction current
Emden-Biomass Power Plant	Emden		20					
Emden Power Plant	Emden		450	120	390			
Emsland Natural Gas Power Plant	Lingen	52°28′50.93″N 7°18′20.11″E	864	160	520		Natural gas	
Ensdorf Power Plant	Ensdorf	49°17′40.04″N 6°46′18.13″E	430	180	590			
Erfurt-Ost Heating Power Station	Erfurt, Thuringia	51 00 55 N 011 02 23 E		226	741			demolished
Essen-Karnap Incineration Plant	Essen-Karnap, North Rhine-Westphalia	51°30′53.98″N 6°59′37.93″E		200	660		Waste	
Franken I Power Plant	Nuremberg	49°25′14.88″N 11°00′27.64″E	843	150	490			
Franken II Power Station	Erlangen, Bavaria	49°33′47″N 10°58′25″E		202	663	1963/64		demolished in 2001
Flensburg Heating Power Plant	Flensburg		170	140	460			
Frankfurt Traction Current Power Plant	Frankfurt	50°05′48.88″N 8°39′5.26″E	12			1966		only traction current
Freimann Heating Power Plant	Munich	48°11′18″N 11°36′42″E	160				Natural gas	
Frimmersdorf Power Station	Frimmersdorf, North Rhine-Westphalia	51°3′16.19″N 6°34′33.31″E; 51°3′19.76″N 6°34′34.7″E; 51°3′28.02″N 6°34′38.65″E	623	200	660		Coal (lignite)	CO_{2} output (2017) = 3.58 million tonnes
Gemeinschaftskraftwerk Schweinfurt	Schweinfurt	50°1′48.31″N 10°13′24.98″E	126	97.5	320		Coal, waste	
Gera-Nord Heating Power Station (3 Essen)	Gera, Thuringia	50°54′18.59″N 12°3′48.34″E; 50°54′17.65″N 12°3′44.96″E; 50°54′15.69″N 12°3′48.6″E		225	738			
Gersteinwerk	Werne, North Rhine-Westphalia	51°40′24.79″N 7°43′14.28″E	2127	282	925	1984	Coal	
Goldenberg Power Plant	Hürth	50°51′40.47″N 6°50′7.34″E	171	125	410			
Grosskrotzenburg Power Station	Großkrotzenburg, Hessen	50°5′17.76″N 8°57′5.97″E	1132	250	820		Coal	
GuD-Heating Station Knapsack	Hürth		800	70	230			
Gustav Knepper Power Station	Dortmund, North Rhine-Westphalia	51°34′06.52″N 7°20′56.77″E	350	210	690		Coal	demolished by explosives on February 17, 2019
Hagenwerder Power Plant, Unit III	Görlitz/Hagenwerder, Saxony	51°3′42″N 14°56′55″E		250	820	1972/73	Coal	demolished by explosives on June 19, 1998
Hamm-Schmehausen Power Station	Hamm-Schmehausen, North Rhine-Westphalia	51°40′49.1″N 7°58′12.7″E	850	200	660		Natural gas	
Hannover-Herrenhausen Power Plant	Hannover		105	110	360			
Hannover-Kronsberg Heating Power Plant	Hannover-Kronsberg		1.17					
Hannover-Linden Power Plant	Hannover		100	100	330			
Hannover-Stöcken Power Plant	Hannover	52°25′13″N 9°38′51.03″E	230	70	230			
Herne Power Station	Herne, North Rhine-Westphalia	51°33′2.36″N 7°11′15.27″E	950	300	980	1989	Coal	
Heilbronn Power Station	Heilbronn, Baden-Württemberg	49°10′31.91″N 9°12′27.19″E	1130	250	820		Coal	
Hermann Wenzel Power Plant	Duisburg							
Heyden Power Station	Petershagen, North Rhine-Westphalia	52°22′53.79″N 8°59′55.2″E	920	227	745		Coal	
Huckingen Power Plant	Duisburg-Huckingen		600					
Ibbenbüren Power Station	Ibbenbüren, North Rhine-Westphalia	52°17′9.11″N 7°44′45.23″E	770	275	902	1985	Anthracite	
Ingolstadt Waste Incineration Plant	Ingolstadt			80	260			
Ingolstadt Power Station	Ingolstadt, Bavaria	48°45′43.23″N 11°30′11.73″E	840	200	660		Oil	
Irsching Power Station	Irsching, Bavaria	48°46′1.32″N 11°34′45.19″E; 48°46′1.48″N 11°34′49.46″E; 48°46′1.43″N 11°34′52.92″E	1869	200	660		Natural gas, oil	
Power Plant Jänschwalde	Jänschwalde	51°49′56.07″N 14°27′10.89″E; 51°49′55.76″N 14°27′25.89″E; 51°49′55.5″N 14°27′40.96″E	3000	300	980	1981	Coal (lignite)	
Jena Heating Power Station	Jena, Thuringia	50°53′51.53″N 11°35′12.5″E	225	225	738		Natural gas	
Karlsruhe-West Heating Power Plant	Karlsruhe	49°0′50.98″N 8°20′51.56″E	33	140	460			
Karlsruhe RDK 7 and 8	Karlsruhe	49°0′47″N 8°18′29″E	1827	233	764		Bituminous coal	
Kassel Power Plant	Kassel		34					
Kempten Waste Power Plant	Kempten			60	200			
Kiel Power Plant	Kiel		354	113	371			
Kirchmöser Power Station	Brandenburg	52°23′40.55″N 12°25′4.97″E	160	70	230			traction current
Kirchlengern Power Plant	Kirchlengern		182	66	217			
Kraftwerk Westfalen	Siegenbeckstraße, Hamm-Uentrop	51°40′49″N 7°58′11″E	305				Coal	
Lauchhammer-South Heating Plant	Lauchhammer, Saxony	51°28′14″N 13°46′46″E		200	660			demolished in 2002
Lausward Power Plant	Düsseldorf	51°13′15.03″N 6°43′53.66″E	520	150	490			also traction current
Leuna Power Station	Leuna	51°17′53.19″N 12°01′10.22″E	158	70	230			
Lingen Reffinery Power Plant	Lingen	52°33′43.33″N 7°18′9.49″E	68	150	490			
Lippendorf Power Station	Lippendorf, Saxony	51°10′36.37″N 12°22′34.94″E		300	980	1967	Coal (lignite)	demolished in 2005
Lippendorf Power Station	Lippendorf, Saxony	51°10′56″N 12°22′24″E	1867			1999/2000	Coal (lignite)	Two new plants commissioned 1999 / 2000
Lünen Power Station	Lünen, North Rhine-Westphalia	51°36′50.79″N 7°28′53.12″E	500	250	820		Coal	110 MW traction current
Lünen Trianel Coal Power Plant	Lünen, North Rhine-Westphalia	51°36′51″N 7°27′42″E	750			2013	Coal	Trianel Coal Power Plant, Lünen
Magdeburg Waste Power Plant	Magdeburg		150	60	200			
Mannheim-Neckarau Power Station	Mannheim-Neckarau, Baden-Württemberg	49°26′40″N 8°29′53″E; 49°26′36.73″N 8°30′9.76″E	2146	200	660		Coal	310 MW traction current
Marbach Power Plant	Marbach	48°55′38.89″N 9°13′48.26″E		160	520			
Marl-Chemiepark Power Station	Marl, North Rhine-Westphalia	51°41′34″N 7°6′33″E		300	980		Coal	demolished
Marl-Chemiepark Power Station	Marl, North Rhine-Westphalia	51°41′4.4″N 7°5′59.62″E		241	791			
Mehrum Power Station	Hohenhameln, Lower Saxony	52°18′54.16″N 10°5′37.65″E	690	250	820		Coal	
Merkenich Heating Power Station	Cologne, North Rhine-Westphalia	51°01′5.03″N 6°57′52.14″E	195	250	820		Natural gas, coal (lignite)	
Moers-Meerbeck Power Station	Moers-Meerbeck, North Rhine-Westphalia	51°28′13.95″N 6°38′32.78″E		210	690		Coal	
Moorburg Power Plant	Hamburg	53°29′20″N 9°56′56″E	1730			2015	Coal	
Munich-North Heating Power Plant	Munich	48°10′52.44″N 11°38′23.36″E	360	130	430		Coal	
Munich-South Heating Power Plant	Munich	48°6′50.53″N 11°33′20.82″E	698	175	574		Natural gas, oil	
Neurath Power Station	Grevenbroich	51°02′16.15″N 6°36′42.77″E	4300	195	640		Coal (lignite)	(3 × 312 MW, 636 + 636) and 2 × 1100 MW CO_{2} output (2017) = 29.90 million tonnes
Niederaussem Power Station	Niederaussem	50°59′44″N 6°40′09″E	3864				Coal (lignite)	CO_{2} output (2017) = 27.17 million tonnes
Offleben Power Station	Offleben, Lower Saxony	52°08′45.64″N 11°01′41.92″E		207	679		Coal (lignite)	
Pleinting Power Plant	Pleinting	48°40′8.78″N 13°6′31″E	725	175	574	1968 - 2008	Light oil	
Rostock Power Station	Rostock	54°08′34.24″N 12°7′58.62″E	600	141.5	464		Coal	
Rüstersieler Power Station	Rüstersieler, Lower Saxony	53°33′56.93″N 8°8′46.46″E	747	275	902		Coal	
Römerbrücke Heating Power Plant	Saarbrücken	49°13′25.15″N 7°00′53.71″E	110	177	581			
Robert Frank Power Plant	Landesbergen		500	181	594			
Shamrock Power Plant	Herne		132	76	249			
Sindelfingen Heating Power Plant	Sindelfingen	48°41′48.83″N 8°59′57.39″E		120	390			
Schkopau Power Station	Schkopau, Saxony-Anhalt	51°23′54.44″N 11°57′1.17″E	916	200	660		Coal (lignite)	110 MW traction current
Schwedt Power Station	Schwedt, Brandenburg	53°5′54.06″N 14°13′10.34″E		200	660			
Power Plant Scholven	Gelsenkirchen	51°36′12.84″N 7°0′7.44″E; 51°36′2.06″N 7°0′16.56″E	760	302	991		Coal	
Scholven A Power Station	Gelsenkirchen, North Rhine-Westphalia	51°35′59.83″N 7°0′20.27″E		240.5	789			
Schwandorf Power Station	Schwandorf, Bavaria	49°18′13.82″N 12°4′39.05″E; 49°18′14.42″N 12°4′35.33″E		235	771		Coal (lignite)	demolished
Schilling Power Station	Stade, Lower Saxony	53°37′4″N 9°31′57″E		220	720	1962	Oil	demolished
Schwarze Pumpe power station	Spremberg	51°32′8.93″N 14°21′17.11″E	1600	172	564		Coal (lignite)	
Stuttgart-Gaisburg Power Plant	Stuttgart	48°46′56.09″N 9°13′52.81″E	60	160	520			
Stuttgart-Münster Power Plant	Stuttgart	48°48′55.31″N 9°13′11.07″E	164	180	590			
Thierbach Power Station	Espenhain, Saxony	51°10′4.83″N 12°30′28.89″E		300	980		Coal (lignite)	demolished
Thyrow Gas Turbine Power Plant	Thyrow		300					
Tiefstack Power Station	Hamburg	53°31′37″N 10°3′49″E	321	120	390		Coal and gas	
Veltheim Power Plant	Veltheim	52°11′23″N 8°56′1″E	880	140	460		Coal	
Völklingen-Fenne Power Plant	Völklingen	49°14′58.48″N 6°52′53.2″E	600	160	520			Steag Völklingen complex
Voerde Power Plant	Voerde, North Rhine-Westphalia	51°34′37.65″N 6°40′53.19″E	2234				Coal (lignite)	Steag pdf page
Walheim Power Plant	Walheim	49°01′6.38″N 9°9′26.39″E	253	148	486		Coal	
Walsum Power Station	Walsum, North Rhine-Westphalia	51°31′42.81″N 6°42′52.54″E	410	300	980	1988	Coal	
Werdohl-Elverlingsen Power Station	Werdohl, North Rhine-Westphalia	51°16′33.04″N 7°42′26.24″E; 51°16′33.46″N 7°42′23.75″E	637	282	925		Coal	
Wedel CHP Plant	Wedel	53°33′59.25″N 9°43′32.14″E	260	151	495		Coal	Wedel CHP Plant
Weiher-3 CHP Plant	Quierschied-Weiher, Saarland	49°20′5.23″N 7°2′7.85″E	680	232	761		Coal	Weiher PP
Weisweiler Power Plant	Eschweiler	50°50′21.14″N 6°19′25.88″E	2457	180	590		Primary: coal (lignite), secondary: natural gas	Weisweiler PP
Westfalen Hamm Power Plant	Uentrop-Schmehausen, North Rhine-Westphalia	51°40′36″N 7°58′21″E	850			2007	Natural gas	Westfalen Hamm PP
Wilhelmshaven Power Station (E.ON)	Wilhelmshaven, Lower Saxony	53°33′53″N 8°8′49″E	747	250	820	1976	Coal	
Wolfsburg Heating Power Plant	Wolfsburg		140	118	387			
Wolfsburg-West Heating Power Plant	Wolfsburg		300	160	520			
Weissenhorn Waste Incineration Plant	Weissenhorn							
West Heating Power Plant	Frankfurt		244	125	410			
Westerholt Power Station	Gelsenkirchen, North Rhine-Westphalia	51°36′4.48″N 7°3′52.16″E		337.5	1,107	1997	Coal	demolished in 2006
Wuppertal-Barmen Heating Power Plant	Wuppertal	51°16′8.86″N 7°12′1.71″E	56	137	449			
Wuppertal-Elberfeld Heating Power Plant	Wuppertal	51°14′54.19″N 7°7′7.61″E	100	198	650			
Zolling CHP plant	Zolling, Bavaria	48°27′19.05″N 11°47′58.25″E	449	220	720		Coal, biomass	

== Hydroelectric ==
Station	Town	Geographical coordinates	Capacity (MW)
Bad Abbach Power Station	Bad Abbach	48.94638809°N 12.01305556°E	3.5 MW (traction current)
Aufkirchen Power Station	Aufkirchen	48.3052492°N 11.8577135°E	40 (13 MW traction current)
Bad Säckingen Power Station	Bad Säckingen	47.5577658°N 7.956714°E	73.6
Bergheim Power Station	Bad Säckingen	48.7507492°N 11.2729812°E	23.7 (only traction current)
Bertoldsheim Power Station	Rennertshofen	48.735722°N 11.0208321°E	18.9 (only traction current)
Bettenberg Power Station	Nagold	48.600881°N 8.73715°E	0.2
Bittenbrunn Power Station	Bittenbrunn	48.7344448°N 11.1436504°E	20.2 (only traction current)
Dettingen Power Station	Dettingen	48.112167°N 10.133225°E	11
Eitting Power Station	Eitting	48.3589581°N 11.8827975°E	? (only traction current)
Fankel Power Station	Fankel	50.124044°N 7.227222°E	16.4
Forggensee Dam	Rosshaupten	47.6542518°N 10.7497251°E	45.5
Iffezheim Power Station	Iffezheim	48.8327607°N 8.1104851°E	104
Ingolstadt Hydroelectric Power Station	Ingolstadt	48.7503672°N 11.4119518°E	19.8 (only traction current)
Kachlet Power Station	Passau	48.5791554°N 13.4073865°E	52
Koblenz Power Station	Koblenz	50.365783°N 7.581553°E	16
Laufenburg Power Station	Laufenburg	47.5566146°N 8.0480593°E	106
Möhne Dam	Günne	51.4896339°N 8.0589706°E	7.04
Mühlhausen Power Station	Mühlacker	48.933664°N 8.90195°E	1.68
Pfrombach Power Station	Pfrombach	48.4413727°N 11.9928968°E	? (also traction current)
Rheinfelden Power Station	Rheinfelden	47.5700403°N 7.8126848°E	25.7
Ryburg-Schwörstadt Power Station	Schwörstadt	47.5868403°N 7.8338555°E	120
Schärding-Neuhaus Power Station	Neuhaus am Inn	48.4354009°N 13.4388113°E	96
Serrig Power Station	Serrig	49.566669°N 6.592558°E	12.1
Söse Dam	Osterode am Harz	51.7386962°N 10.310626°E	1.44
Sylvenstein Dam	Langleger	47.5863428°N 11.549651°E	7
Walchensee Hydroelectric Power Station	Kochel am See	47.6298189°N 11.3374454°E	124 (52 MW traction current)
Wendefurth Power Station	Wendefurth	51.7390417°N 10.9071493°E	80
Wyhlen Dam	Grenzach-Wyhlen	47.5389195°N 7.7076817°E	38.5

== Pumped-storage hydroelectric ==
Station	Location	Coordinates	Capacity gen (MW)	Capacity pump (MW)	Notes
Albbecken Pumped Storage Station (Witznau Pumped Storage Station)	Witznau	47.6878681°N 8.2514513°E	220	128	
Bleiloch Pumped Storage Station	Remptendorf	50.5252824°N 11.7150521°E	80	?	
Dhron Valley Dam	Heidenburg	49.796274°N 6.8985558°E	8.1	?	Since 1995 no pump operation
Erzhausen Pumped Storage Station	Erzhausen	51.898611111111°N 9.925°E	220	228	
Geesthacht Pumped Storage Station	Geesthacht	53.4191238°N 10.3936458°E	131	?	
Glems Pumped Storage Station	Glems	48.5051789°N 9.2872453°E	90	?	
Goldisthal Pumped Storage Station	Goldisthal	50.5080843°N 11.0044706°E	1060	?	
Happurg Pumped Storage Station	Happurg	49.487°N 11.475°E	160	?	shut down 2011-2028. 850 MWh storage
Häusern Pumped Storage Station	Häusern	47.7553855°N 8.1883067°E	140	?	
Hohenwarte II Pumped Storage Station	Hohenwarte	50.6040914°N 11.4749408°E	320	?	
Hotzenwald Pumped Storage Station	Wehr	47.6523655°N 7.9256701°E	992	?	
Koepchenwerk Pumped Storage Station	Herdecke	51.411363°N 7.4541378°E	153	?	
Langenprozelten Pumped Storage Station	Langenprozelten	50.0531314°N 9.5813522°E	160 (only traction current)	?	
Leitzach Pumped Storage Station	Vagen	47.8740619°N 11.8701214°E	93	?	
Markersbach Pumped Storage Station	Markersbach	50.5175266°N 12.8806436°E	1050	?	
Mittweida Pumped Storage Station	Mittweida	50.9895028°N 13.0066431°E	1.65	?	Defunct
Niederwartha Pumped Storage Station	Niederwartha	51.0913301°N 13.6100435°E	120	?	
Oder Valley Dam	Bad Lauterberg	51.6460663°N 10.5031013°E	5.04	?	
Ortenberg-Lissberg Pumped Storage Station	Ortenberg	50.3763118°N 9.092592°E	2.3	?	
Reisach Pumped Storage Station	Reisach	49.530104°N 12.2845924°E	105	?	
Rönkhausen Pumped Storage Station	Rönkhausen-Glinge	51.2247664°N 7.9933155°E	160	?	
Rudolf-Fettweis-Power Plant	Forbach	48.6685328°N 8.3530855°E	44	?	
Rusel Power Plant	Deggendorf-Mietraching	48.8592093°N 13.0070293°E	44	?	
Säckingen Pumped Storage Station	Bad Säckingen	47.5656065°N 7.9536295°E	472	?	
Tanzmühle Pumped Storage Station	Döllnitz	49.5521595°N 12.281127°E	25.2	?	
Waldeck I Pumped Storage Station	Hemfurth-Edersee	51.1661452°N 9.0463078°E	146	?	
Waldeck II Pumped Storage Station	Hemfurth-Edersee	51.1665488°N 9.0465868°E	440	?	
Waldshut Pumped Storage Station	Waldshut	47.6176199°N 8.192625°E	176	?	
Warmutsgund Pumped Storage Station	Obersdorf	47.3495674°N 10.2657473°E	4.72	?	
Wendefurth Pumped Storage Station	Wendefurth	51.7390151°N 10.9072566°E	80	?	
Wisenta Pumped Storage Station	Crispendorf	50.5763182°N 11.7171872°E	3.3	?	

== Battery storage ==
Power station	Location	Coordinates	Storage (MWh)	Power (MW)	Commissioned
Alfeld	Lower Saxony		282	237	2026
Bollingstedt	Gammellund	54.577°N 9.474°E	238	103	2025
Arzberg	Arzberg		200	100	2024
Kraftwerk Westfalen	Hamm	51.677°N 7.967°E	151	140	2025
	Under construction				
Eco Stor	Förderstedt		714	300	2027
Gundremmingen	Gundremmingen		700	400	
Lichtblick	Chemnitz		470	100	2027
Netzbooster	Kupferzell		250	250	
Schuby	Schuby		238	103	2027 110 kV grid
	Projects				
Jänschwalde			4000	1000	
Boxberg 400			1600	400	
Lingen	Lower Saxony		800	400	
template	location	coords	MWh	MW	ref

== Wind power ==
Germany's largest onshore wind power plants
Description	Location	Coordinates	Peak power (MW)	Production (MW·h/year)	Capacity factor
Holtriem	Lower Saxony	53°36′37″N 7°25′45″E	207		
Reußenköge	Schleswig-Holstein	54°36′40″N 8°54′13″E	203		
Werder/Kessin	Mecklenburg-Vorpommern	53°42′55″N 13°19′11″E	201		
Stößen-Teuchern	Sachsen-Anhalt	51°7′54″N 11°57′51″E	183		
Hüselitz	Sachsen-Anhalt	52°30′57″N 11°46′51″E	151		

Germany's largest offshore wind power plants
Description	Location	Coordinates	Peak power (MW)	Production (MW·h/year)	Capacity factor
Hohe See	North Sea	54°26′0″N 6°28′0″E	497		0.42
Borkum Riffgrund 2	North Sea	54°58′0″N 6°29′44″E	464		0.30
Veja Mate	North Sea	54°19′00″N 5°52′0″E	402		
BARD	North Sea	54°21′18″N 5°58′48″E	400		
Global Tech I	North Sea	54°15′43″N 6°24′38″E	400		

== Photovoltaic ==
Germany's largest photovoltaic (PV) power plants
Description	Location	Coordinates	Peak power (MW)	Production (MW·h/year)	Capacity factor
Neuhardenberg Solar Park		52°36′49.62″N 14°14′32.64″E	145		
Strasskirchen Solar Park	Strasskirchen		54		
Lieberose Photovoltaic Park			53		0.11
Kothen Solar Park			45		
Finsterwalde Solar Park			42		
550,000 thin-film modules (see Waldpolenz Solar Park)	Muldentalkreis	51°19′43″N 12°39′20″E	40	40,000	0.11
Amsdorf Solar Park		51°28′N 11°44′E	28		
Solarpark Heideblick		51°50′N 13°40′E	27.5		
Solarpark Eiche		52°34′N 13°36′E	26.5		
Lauingen Energy Park		48°32′13″N 10°25′27″E	25.7	26,980	
1408 SOLON mover (see Erlasee Solar Park)	Arnstein	50°0′10″N 9°55′15″E	12	14,000	0.13
57,912 solar modules (see Pocking Solar Park)	Pocking	48°22′4″N 13°17′55″E	10	11,500	0.13
57,600 solar modules (see Bavaria Solarpark)	Mühlhausen	49°09′29″N 11°25′59″E	6.3	6,750	0.12
30,000 BP Solar modules	Bürstadt	49°39′N 8°28′E	5	4,200	0.10
33,500 Shell Solar modules	Espenhain	51°12′N 12°31′E	5	5,000	0.11
25,000 BP solar modules (see Geiseltalsee Solarpark)	Merseburg	51°22′N 12°0′E	4	3,400	0.10
50,000 solar modules	Gottelborn	49°21′N 7°2′E	4	8,200	0.23
32,740 solar modules	Hemau	49°3′N 11°47′E	4	3,900	0.11
Solara, Sharp and Kyocera solar modules	Dingolfing	48°38′N 12°30′E	3.3	3,050	0.11
Sharp solar modules (see Bavaria Solarpark)	Guenching	49°16′N 11°34′E	1.9	-	
Sharp solar modules (see Bavaria Solarpark)	Minihof	n.a.	1.9	-	

== Nuclear ==
Under the Atomic Energy Act, the last three nuclear energy plants were shut down by April 2023.

Name	Location	Geographical coordinates	Type	Capacity (MW)	Operational	Notes
VAK	Kahl am Main	50.0591294°N 8.9871812°E	BWR	15	1960–1985	
MZFR	Leopoldshafen	49.1043102°N 8.4325862°E	PHWR	52	1965–1984	
AVR	Jülich	50.9030599°N 6.4213693°E	HTGR	13	1966–1988	
KKR	Rheinsberg	53.1472465°N 12.9903674°E	VVER	62	1966–1990	GDR plant, shut down after German reunification
KRB Unit A	Gundremmingen	48.513264°N 10.4020357°E	BWR	238	1966–1977	
KRB Unit B	Gundremmingen	48.5148276°N 10.402379°E	BWR	1284	1984–2017	
KRB Unit C	Gundremmingen	48.5155383°N 10.4020786°E	BWR	1288	1985–2021	Shut down on 31 December 2021
KWO	Obrigheim	49.364503°N 9.076252°E	PWR	340	1968–2005	
KWL	Lingen	52.4831853°N 7.3005223°E	BWR	250	1968–1977	
HDR	Grosswelzheim	50.0551446°N 8.9848691°E	BWR	23	1969–1971	
KKS	Stade	53.6200685°N 9.5306289°E	PWR	640	1972–2003	
KKN	Niederaichbach	48.6058015°N 12.3000848°E	HWGCR	100	1973–1974	
KGR Unit 1	Greifswald	54.1417497°N 13.6583877°E	VVER	408	1974–1990	GDR plant, shut down after German reunification
KGR Unit 2	Greifswald	54.1417623°N 13.6597395°E	VVER	408	1975–1990	
KGR Unit 3	Greifswald	54.1415235°N 13.6624217°E	VVER	408	1978–1990	
KGR Unit 4	Greifswald	54.1414229°N 13.663644°E	VVER	408	1979–1990	
KGR Unit 5	Greifswald	54.140631°N 13.6664128°E	VVER	408	1989–1990	
KWB Unit A	Biblis	49.709331°N 8.415865°E	PWR	1176	1975–2011	
KWB Unit B	Biblis	49.7089474°N 8.413285°E	PWR	1240	1977–2011	
KWW	Würgassen	51.6396481°N 9.3915617°E	BWR	640	1975–1994	
GKN Unit 1	Neckarwestheim	49.0401151°N 9.1721088°E	PWR	785	1976–2011	capacity including traction current
GKN Unit 2	Neckarwestheim	49.0406214°N 9.1755903°E	PWR	1269	1989–April 2023	Shut down: 15 April 2023
KKB	Brunsbüttel	53.8913533°N 9.2005777°E	BWR	771	1977–2011	
KKI Isar Unit 1	Essenbach	48.6044748°N 12.2972095°E	BWR	870	1979–2011	
KKI Isar Unit 2	Essenbach	48.6055532°N 12.2931647°E	PWR	1365	1988–April 2023	Shut down: April 15, 2023
KKU Unterweser	Stadland	53.4293465°N 8.4774649°E	PWR	1285	1979–2011	
KNK-I/II	Leopoldshafen	49.0973279°N 8.4327739°E	FBR	21	1979–1991	fast sodium-cooled research reactor
KKP Unit 1	Philippsburg	49.2513078°N 8.4356761°E	BWR	890	1980–2011	
KKP Unit 2	Philippsburg	49.2513078°N 8.4356761°E	PWR	1358	1985–2019	
KKG	Grafenrheinfeld	49.9841308°N 10.1846373°E	PWR	1275	1981–2015	
KKK Krümmel	Geesthacht	53.4104656°N 10.4091597°E	BWR	1260	1984–2011	
KWG	Grohnde	52.0348748°N 9.4097793°E	PWR	1360	1985–2021	Shut down: Dec. 31, 2021
KBR	Brokdorf	53.850666°N 9.3457603°E	PWR	1326	1986–2021	Shut down: Dec. 31, 2021
KMK	Mülheim-Kärlich	50.408791°N 7.4861956°E	PWR	1219	1987–1988	
THTR	Hamm-Uentrop	51.6786228°N 7.9700232°E	HTGR	296	1987–1988	
KKE	Emsland	52.4716974°N 7.3206389°E	PWR	1290	1988–April 2023	Shut down April 15, 2023
Legend: Reactor is currently operational Decommissioned reactor Types: BWR = Boiling water reactor, FBR = Fast breeder reactor, HTGR = High-temperature gas-cooled reactor, HWGCR = Heavy water gas-cooled reactor, PHWR = Pressurized heavy-water reactor, PWR = Pressurized water reactor, VVER = Water-water energetic reactor

== See also ==
- List of power stations in Europe
- List of largest power stations in the world
