= Datteln Power Station =

Power station in Germany

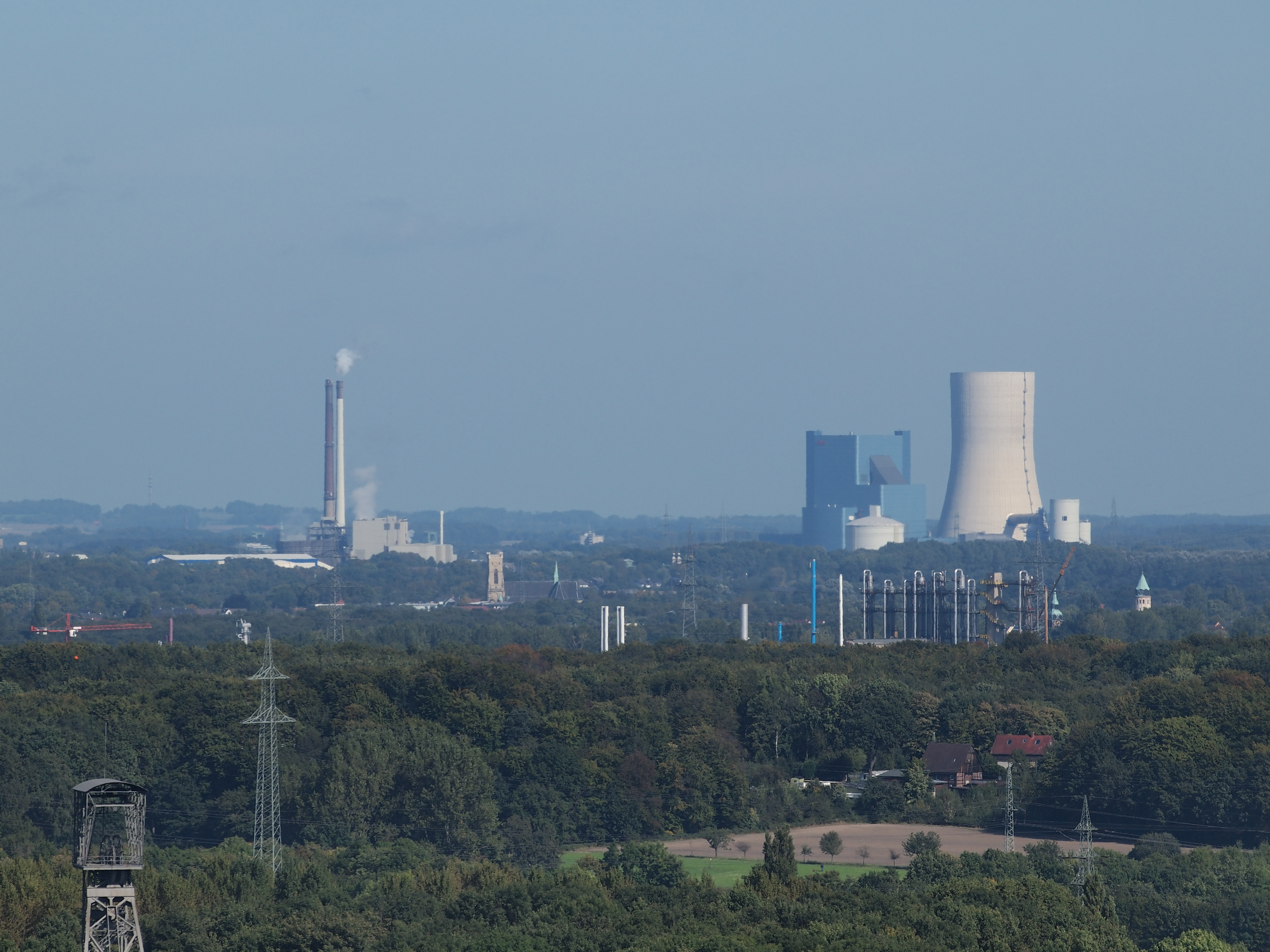
- Left the old retired units 1-3, right the new unit 4 with the new chimney cooling tower (180 m tall)
- Official name: Kraftwerk Datteln
- Country: Germany
- Location: Datteln, North Rhine-Westphalia
- Coordinates: 51°37′57″N 7°20′27″E
- Status: Operational
- Commission date: 1964
- Construction cost: US$1.1 billion
- Owner: Uniper

Thermal power station
- Primary fuel: Coal
- Turbine technology: Steam turbine
- Site area: 69 hectares (170 acres)
- Cooling towers: 1 (operational)
- Cogeneration?: Yes
- Thermal capacity: 2600 MW (380 MW district heating)

Power generation
- Units operational: 1 x 1100 MW (gross)
- Units decommissioned: 2 × 100 MW; 1 × 119 MW
- Nameplate capacity: 1052 MW

External links
- Website: www.uniper.energy
- Commons: Related media on Commons

Datteln Power Station (German: Kraftwerk Datteln) is a modern coal-fired thermal power station in Datteln, Recklinghausen, 12 km north of Dortmund, North Rhine-Westphalia, Germany. It comprises four units with a total capacity of approximately 1,419 MW gross. Units 1-3 were built between 1964 and 1969 and were decommissioned in 2014. A notable characteristic of this power station is the fact that the most recently built unit, Unit 4, does not have a waste gas flue. Instead, the desulphurised flue gases are expelled using the updraught from the existing 180 m (590 ft) cooling tower. The power station is operated by Uniper.

The plant employs about 200 full-time workers and 300 external jobs.

== History ==
About 6,300 people participated in the construction of Unit 4.

In 2025, Uniper agreed to sell Unit 4 to commodity trader and investment company ResInvest Group, as part of a set of measures required by the European Commission in exchange for approving the German government's 13.5 billion euro ($15.87 billion) bailout of Uniper in 2022.

== Technology ==
In addition to electrical power, Unit 4 also delivers 1,000 GWh_{th} yearly of district heating energy, a supply sufficient for 100,000 households in the Castrop-Rauxel and Dortmund-Bodelschwingh areas. Of Unit 4's 1,052 MW net generation capacity, 413 MW are delivered to the Deutsche Bahn grid, powering its railway system. The 50 Hz electricity is converted into 16.7 Hz frequency for the train system and fed to Deutsche Bahn's 110kV high-voltage grid.

The plant's 69 hectares (170 acres) area is separated into two sections, 11 ha (unit 1–3) on left side and 57 ha (unit 4) on the right side of the Dortmund–Ems Canal, which is used to deliver hard coal by barges. Closed conveyor belts then transport the fuel to the coal storage facility. Closed conveyor belts also transport the coal to the coal bunker, from which it is ground to a fine powder using five coal pulverisers. The fine powder is dried using hot air and then blown into the combustion chamber. Burning occurs at 1,300 °C (2,370 °F), boiling water into steam, which is then passed into the high pressure turbines, followed by a medium pressure and two low-pressure turbines. The turbines rotate at 3,000 revolutions per minute, the same speed as the generator. Mitsubishi Hitachi Power Systems supplied the steam generator. The boiler is made of a high creep rupture strength material (T24, developed by Vallourec & Mannesmann), achieving reheat live steam temperatures over 600 °C (1,112 °F). Alstom supplied the steam turbine set, the same 1,100 MW set planned for the scrapped Unit 6 at Staudinger power plant and a proposed Port of Antwerp power plant in Belgium.

Unit 4 is equipped with an advanced multi-step flue gas purification system, which eliminates nitrogen oxides, dust and sulphur from the flue gas. Nitrogen oxide is washed first, followed by dust and finally sulphur.

== Unit Information ==
The Power Station consists of 4 units, of which only Unit 4 is operational.

Thermal Units of Datteln Power Station
Unit	Fuel	Net Output	Commissioned	Decommissioned
1	Hard Coal	95 MW	1964	Feb 2014
2	Hard Coal	95 MW	1965	Feb 2014
3	Hard Coal	116 MW	1969	Feb 2014
4	Hard Coal	1052 MW	2020	2038 (planned)

== See also ==
- List of power stations in Germany
- Großkrotzenburg Power Station
- Energy in Germany
