= Großkrotzenburg =

- Municipality
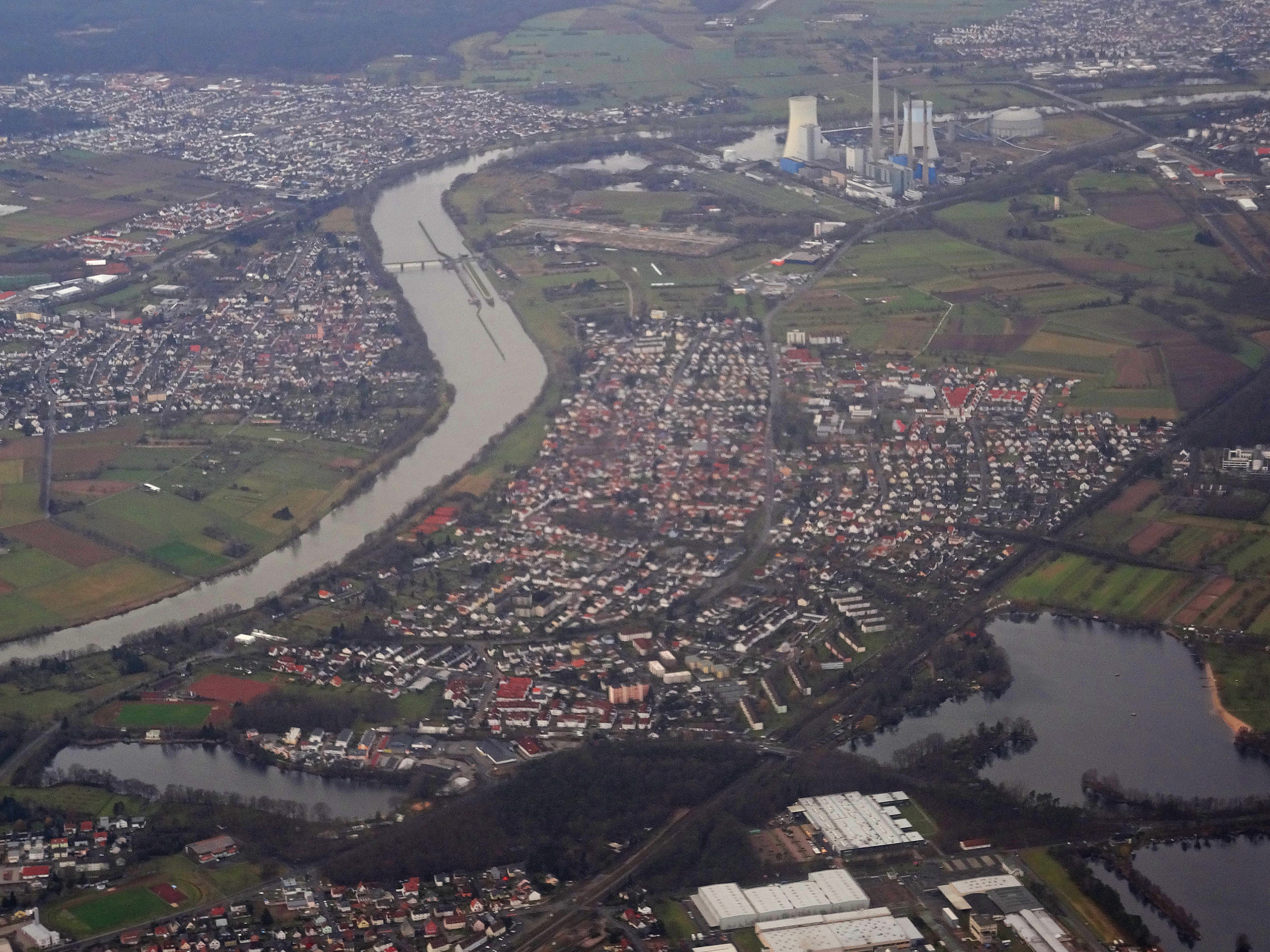
- Aerial view

- Coat of arms

- Location of Großkrotzenburg within Main-Kinzig-Kreis district
- Interactive map of Großkrotzenburg
- Location within Germany Location within Hesse
- Coordinates: 50°05′N 08°59′E
- Country: Germany
- State: Hesse
- Admin. region: Darmstadt
- District: Main-Kinzig-Kreis

Government
  - Mayor (2022–28): Theresa Neumann (CDU)

Area
  - Total: 7.45 km^{2} (2.88 sq mi)
- Elevation: 112 m (367 ft)

Population (2025-12-31)
  - Total: 7,364
  - Density: 988/km^{2} (2,560/sq mi)
- Time zone: UTC+01:00 (CET)
  - Summer (DST): UTC+02:00 (CEST)
- Postal codes: 63538
- Dialling codes: 06186
- Vehicle registration: MKK, HU, GN, SLÜ
- Website: www.grosskrotzenburg.de

Großkrotzenburg is a municipality in the Main-Kinzig district, in Hesse, Germany. It has a population of around 7,500.

The town is mainly known for its swimming lake and its coal-fired power station.

== Geography ==
=== Location ===
Großkrotzenburg is located in the extreme southwest of the Main-Kinzig district, in the southeast of Hesse, bordering on Bavaria. It lies on the right bank of the river Main.

Part of the municipal territory is covered by the Kahler Seenplatte, a system of lakes created by mining and (gravel) quarrying that stretches across the Hessian-Bavarian border and is named after the town Kahl am Main.

Großkrotzenburg municipal territory

=== Neighbouring communities ===
Großkrotzenburg borders on (from the north, clockwise) Hanau, Kahl am Main (in (Aschaffenburg district), and Hainburg (in Offenbach district).

== Infrastructure ==
=== Utilities ===
Kraftwerk Staudinger is a coal-fired thermal power station located west of the town, directly on the Main river. Due to the size of its cooling towers, the power plant is a local landmark.

=== Transport ===
Großkrotzenburg lies on the Bundesstrasse 8.
