= Juwi =

German developer for renewable power supply facilities

JUWI GmbH
- Genre: Renewable energy
- Founded: 1996
- Founder: Fred Jung, Matthias Willenbacher
- Headquarters: Wörrstadt, Germany,
- Revenue: €1.2 billion (2009)
- Operating income: €108,9 million
- Number of employees: 1200
- Website: www.juwi.com

The Juwi GmbH is a company which builds renewable power supply facilities. Founded by Fred Jung and Matthias Willenbacher in 1996, in Rhineland-Palatinate, Germany. Its headquarters is in Wörrstadt. The name "juwi" is an acronym based on the initials of its two founders.

In its early days, Juwi was run by two people. Today, Juwi has over 900 employees and 900 million Euro revenue.

Solar parks have been built by Juwi, such as Waldpolenz Solar Park.
