= Gehrlicher Solar =

- Type: GmbH
- Industry: Solar energy
- Founded: 1994
- Headquarters: Neustadt, Germany
- Key people: Klaus Gehrlicher (founder and majority shareholder); Steffen Licht; Richard von Hehn
- Revenue: €323 million (2011)
- Number of employees: 150 (2013)
- Website: www.gehrlicher.com

Gehrlicher Solar AG is a German photovoltaics corporation with its registered office in Neustadt near Coburg and its administrative headquarters in Dornach near Munich. Gehrlicher Solar AG acts as a system integrator, planning, building, financing, maintaining and operating photovoltaic systems on open areas and roofs. In addition, the corporation acts as a wholesaler for solar modules, inverters and complete photovoltaic systems as well as offering its own developed components from the „GehrTec“ family of products.

== History ==
Enersys Energiesysteme Gehrlicher was founded in 1994 by Gehrlicher's CEO, Klaus Gehrlicher. At the time, the company's fields of activities focused on photovoltaics, solar thermal energy and energy consulting. As of 1998, the company began concentrating its activities on increasingly larger photovoltaic on-grid systems. In 1999 all business activities were transferred to Gehrlicher Umweltschonende Energiesysteme GmbH. In 2004, Gehrlicher Solar Management GmbH was founded as an independent sister company. The company's name was changed from Gehrlicher Umweltschonende Energiesysteme GmbH into Gehrlicher Solar AG in 2007. Due to a cooperation with the public utility, Stadtwerke München, the company began operating photovoltaic power plants in 2008.

Gehrlicher Solar AG had 430 employees at two sites in Germany – Neustadt near Coburg and Dornach near Munich. Furthermore, it operated subsidiaries in the following countries: Italy, Spain, Greece, France, Czech Republic, Slovakia, India, South Africa, Brazil and in the USA.

In 2013 banks terminated the credit line for the company and about 280 people lost their work. Gehrlicher Solar Services GmbH was founded in March 2014 for continuation of business.

== Milestones ==
- 2013: Gehrlicher Solar America Corp. sold to M+W Group
- 2010: Business activities were initiated in India, South Africa and Brazil
- 2009: Gehrlicher Solar France SAS was founded in Paris and Gehrlicher Solar America Corp. was founded in New Jersey/USA
- 2008: Gehrlicher Solar Hellas MEPE was founded in Athens and Gehrlicher Solar Italia s.r.l. was founded in Milan
- 2007: Name of the company was changed to Gehrlicher Solar AG
- 2005: Takeover of Gestión y Ahorro Energético S.L., which was founded in 2001
- 2004: Gehrlicher Solar Management GmbH was founded
- 2001: Gestión y Ahorro Energético S.L. was founded in Murcia/Spain
- 1999: Activities were transferred to Gehrlicher Umweltschonende Energiesysteme GmbH
- 1998: The first solar fund in Europe (Gehrlicher GmbH & Co. Solarpark 2000 kg) was founded
- 1994: Enersys Energiesysteme Gehrlicher was founded by today's CEO, Klaus Gehrlicher

== Awards ==
- 2010: "Europe´s 500 Award", 21st place of the fastest growing European companies in terms of turnover and number of employees
- 2010: Deloitte „Axia Award 2010 for Bavaria“ for Outstanding Innovation Culture
- 2010: Sustained Excellence Award 2010 and Award in the "Technology Fast 50" competition organized by the accounting and consulting firm Deloitte
- 2010: “Intersolar Award” for the development of a transport and mounting system for large modules
- 2009: Award in the „Technology Fast 50“ competition organized by the accounting and consulting firm Deloitte
- 2008 and 2010: Award in „Bavaria‘s Best 50“ competition organized by the Bavarian Ministry for Economy and the auditing firm Ernst & Young
- 2004: German Solar Award for a roof-integrated thin-film system
- 2002: Award in the "Electricity from solar facades“ organized by the Bavarian Chamber of Architects
- 2000: Award in the "Innovative building-integrated solar electricity systems in Bavaria" competition organized by the Bavarian Chamber of Architects
- 2000: „Environmental Energy Award“ from the city of Munich for the „Gehrlicher GmbH & Co. Solarpark 2000 KG“ solar fund

== Projects (selection) ==
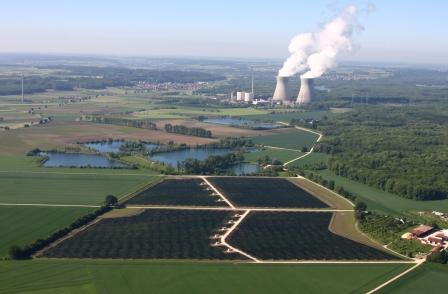
Lauingen Energy Park (26.7 MWp), stage I (10 MW)

- 2011: Construction of Language Solar Park as part of Language Energy Park in the southwest of England
- 2010: Enlargement of Solar Park Helmeringen, output is now 26.7 MWp (Lauingen Energy Park)
- 2009: Construction of Solar Park Rothenburg (20,5 MWp)
- 2008: Construction of Solar Park Helmeringen (Lauingen a. d. Donau) (10 MWp)
- 2007: Commissioning of Spain's largest CdTe thin-film system (5 MWp)
- 2007: Construction of Solar Park Gundelfingen (2,7 MWp) and Salmdorf (1,0 MWp)
- 2005: First open area with thin-film modules as investment model
- 2004: EU project „PV Soundless“: At the time, Europe's largest PV noise barrier
- 2003: EU project „PV Enlargement“: Europe's largest module and inverter test field (Parking deck of the Munich Fair)
