= Waldpolenz Solar Park =

Photovoltaic power station in Germany

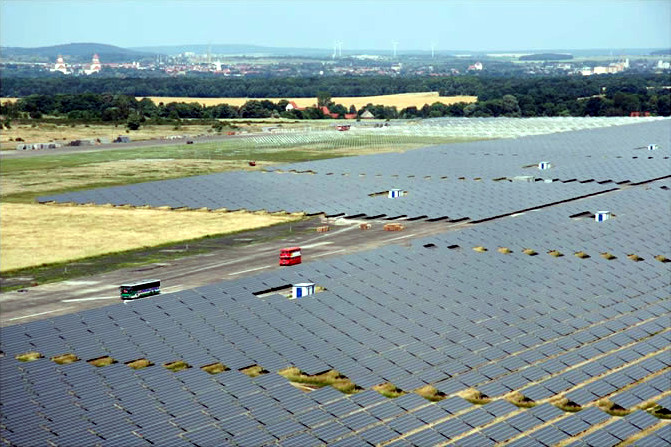
- First Solar 40-MW CdTe PV Array installed by JUWI Group in Waldpolenz, Germany
- Official name: Solarpark Waldpolenz
- Country: Germany
- Coordinates: 51°19′42″N 12°39′22″E
- Construction cost: €130 million
- Operator: Juwi

Solar farm
- Type: Flat-panel PV
- Site area: 220 ha (544 acres) footprint

Power generation
- Units operational: 550,000
- Make and model: First Solar
- Nameplate capacity: 52 MW
- Annual net output: 52 GWh

External links
- Website: Juwi

The Waldpolenz Solar Park is a 52-megawatt (MW) photovoltaic power station built by German developer and operator Juwi at a former military air base near Leipzig, Eastern Germany. When completed by the end of 2008, it was the world's largest thin-film solar park using CdTe-modules.

Initially, the solar power plant's nameplate capacity was 40 MW, consisting of 500,000 state-of-the-art solar panels provided by U.S. manufacturer First Solar, and generated 40,000 MWh of electricity per year. The solar park was then extended with another 153,650 panels, also provided by First Solar, to a final capacity of 52 MW_{P} in 2011

The installation is located in the Muldentalkreis district in the state of Saxony in eastern Germany, built on half of the location's 220 hectares (543.6 acres) in the townships of Brandis and Bennewitz. The investment costs for the Waldpolenz solar park have amounted to some 130 million euro.

== See also ==
- Energy policy of the European Union
- List of photovoltaic power stations
- Photovoltaics
- Pocking Solar Park in Germany
- Renewable energy commercialization
- Renewable energy in the European Union
- Solar power
