= Scholven Power Station =

Coal-fired power plant in Gelsenkirchen, Germany

Coordinates: 51°36′10″N 7°00′34″E

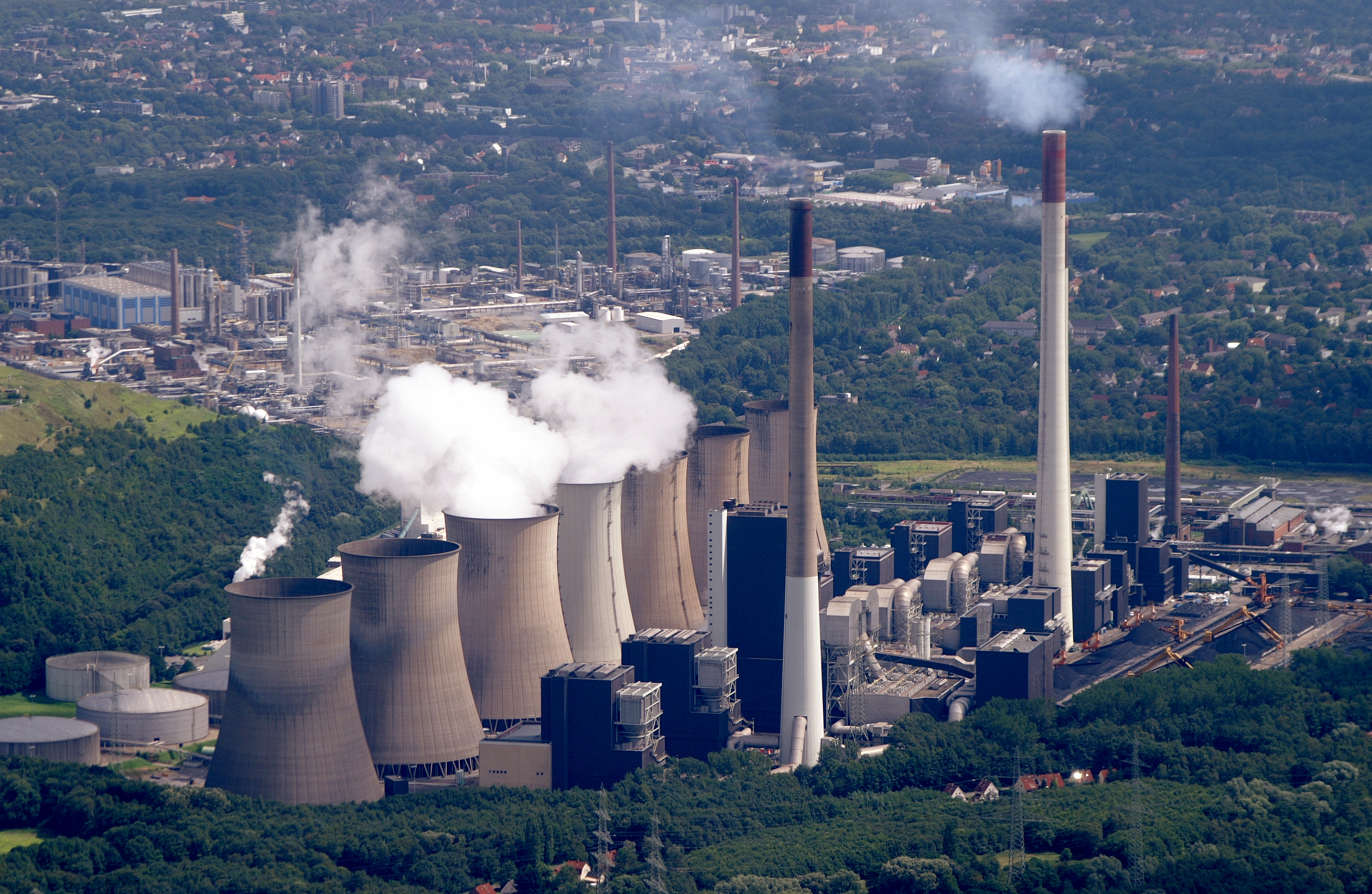
Scholven Power Station (aerial view)

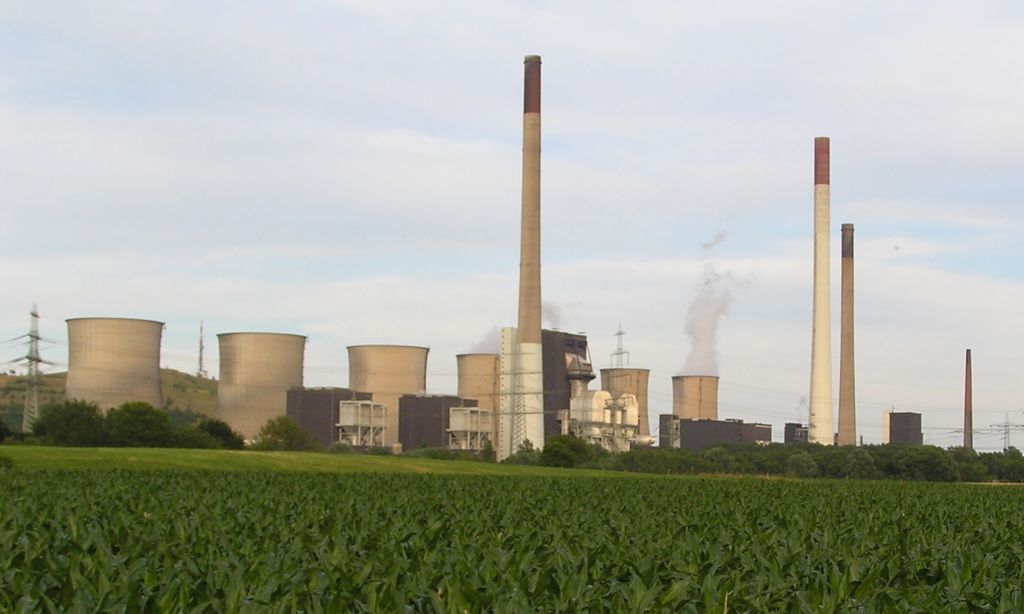
Scholven Power Station

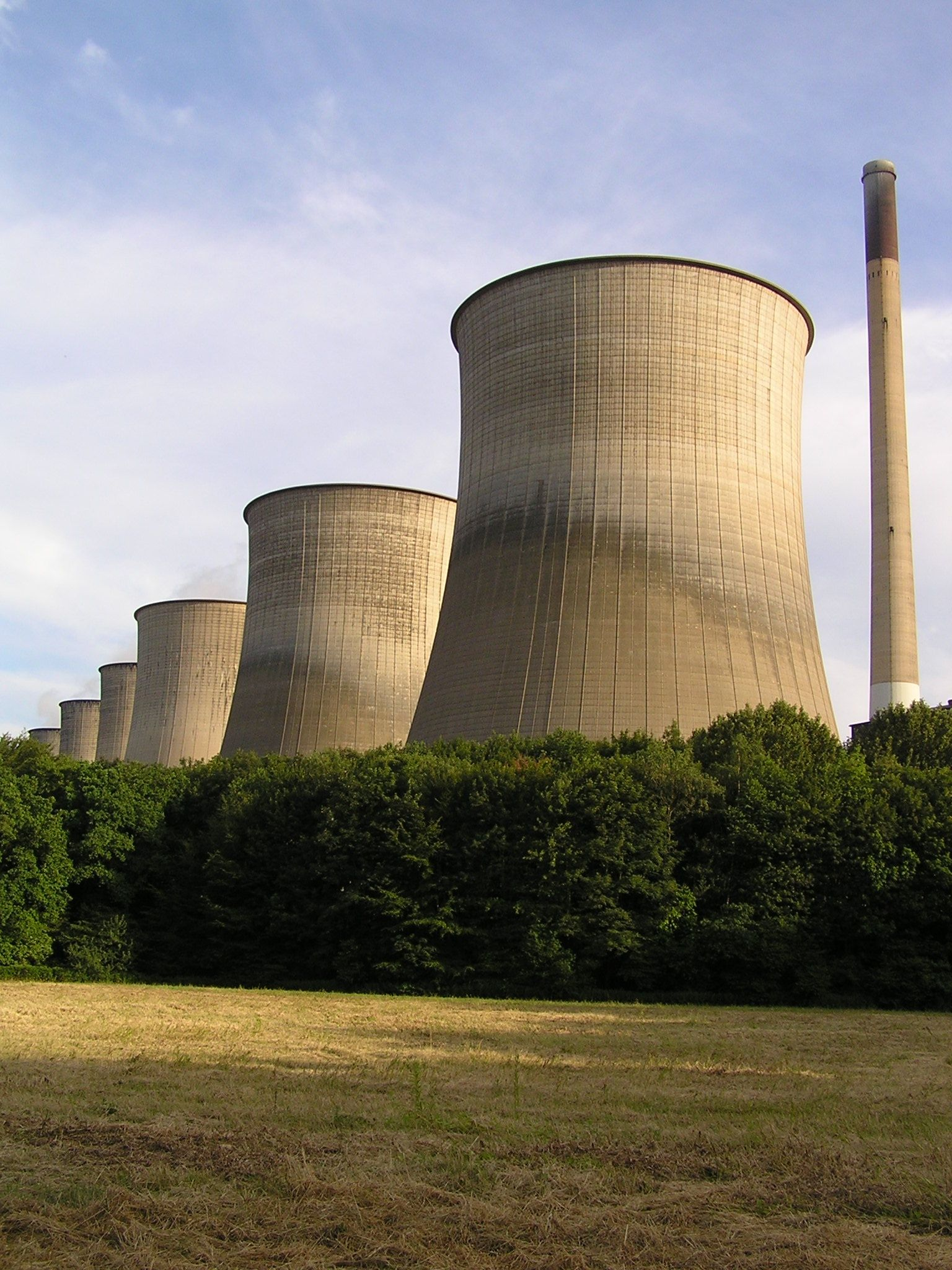
Cooling towers of Scholven Power Station from the north

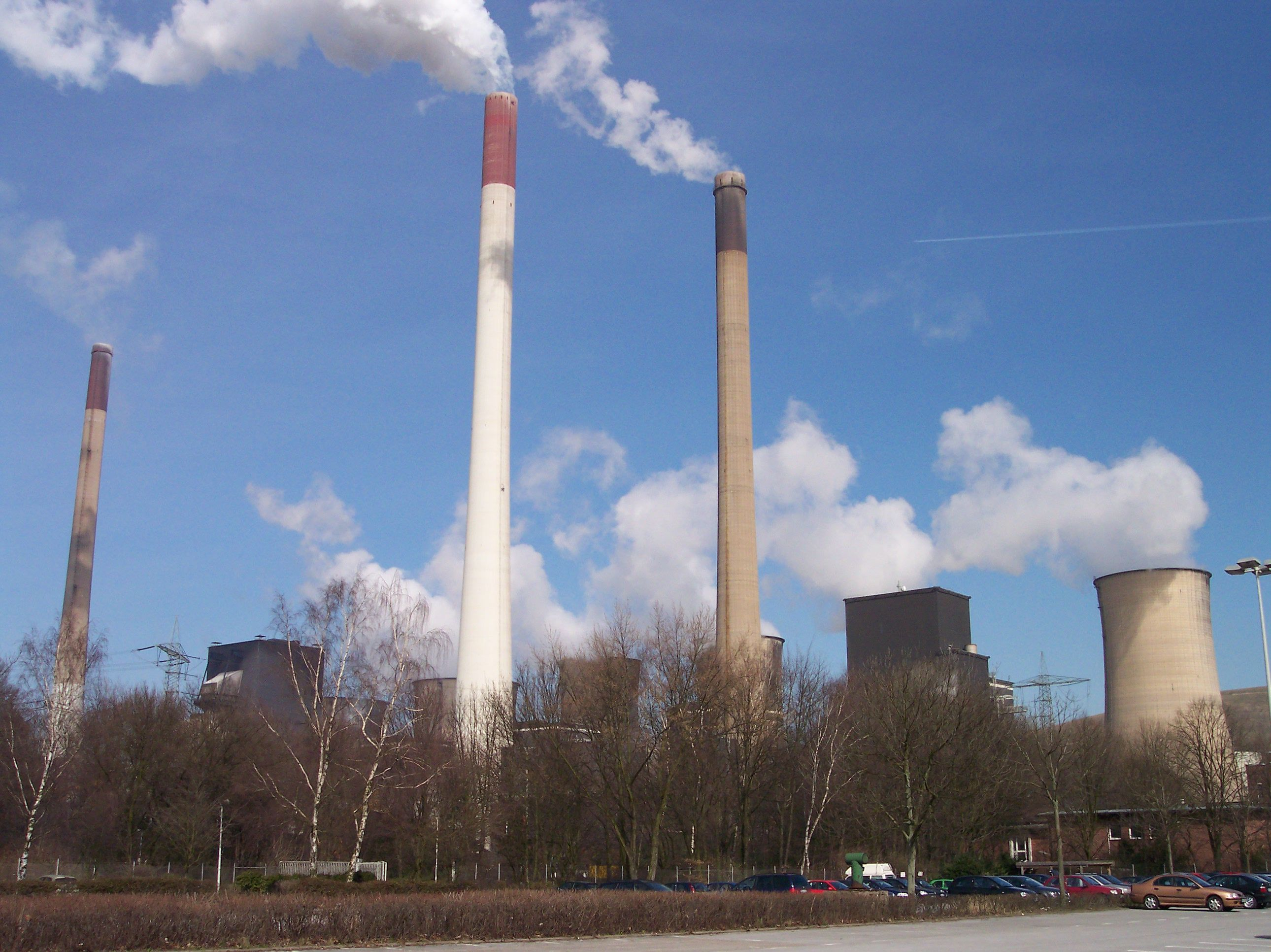
Scholven Power Station

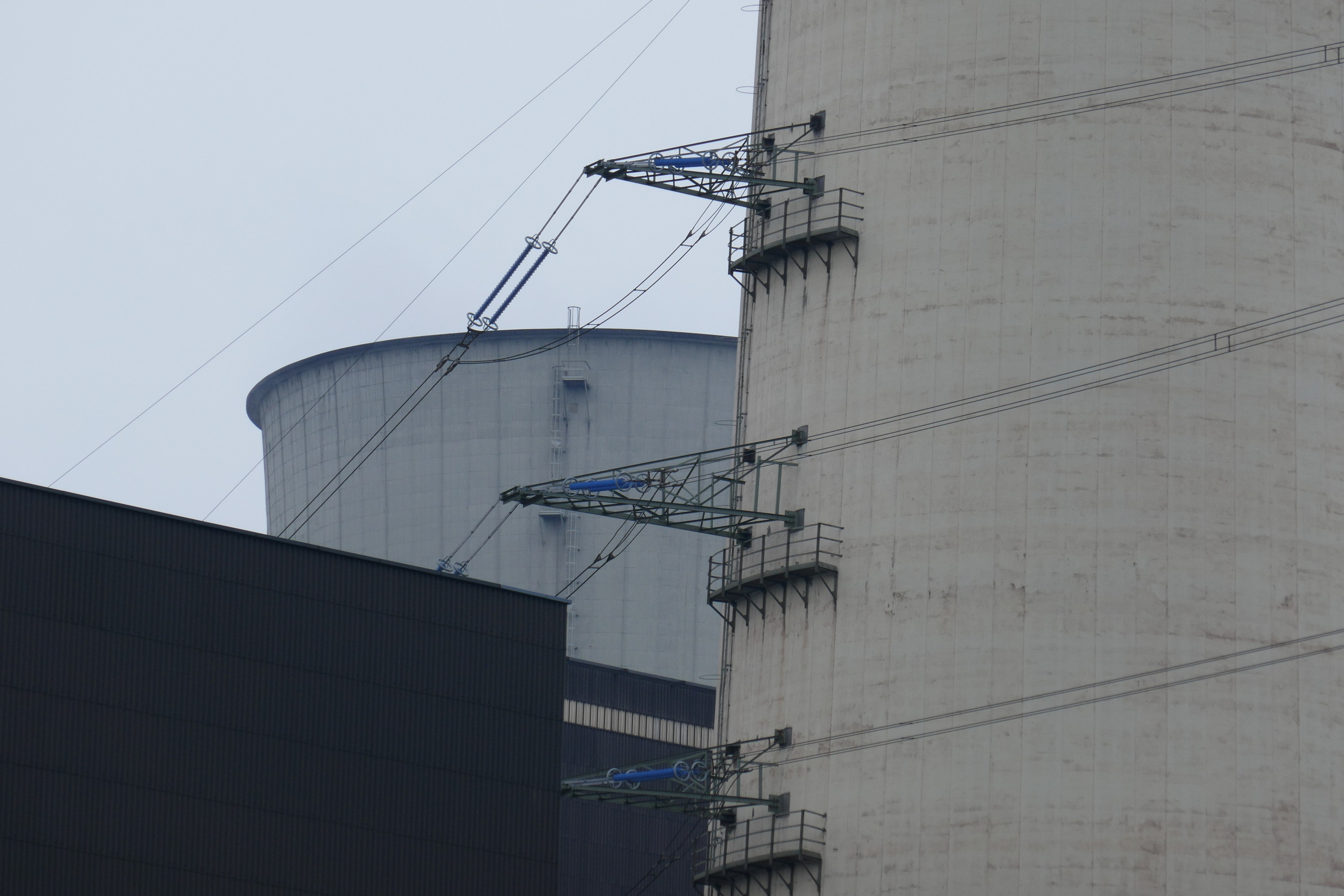
Crossbars on the chimney used by the units B-E, which carry the 220 kV-circuit of the powerline leaving Unit D

Scholven Power Station is a coal-fired power plant in Gelsenkirchen, Germany. With an installed capacity of 2,126 megawatts, it once was one of the largest power stations in Europe. It is owned by Uniper.

== Structure ==
Two power station units present on the location were beaconed up to their shut-down with oil. The electricity produced at Scholven power station once converted about 3% of the German electrical demand. The units B - E, the Buer district heating power station (FWK) and the Scholven steam works (DWS) supply steam to neighbouring chemical enterprises and long-distance heating to some surrounding cities. The two 300-metre (984 ft) tall chimneys, which are amongst the tallest structures in Germany, form an impressive industrial skyline together with the 5 115-metre (377 ft) tall cooling towers. An interesting feature of this power station is that the smokestack used by units B-E has three booms, on which the conductors of the 220 kV-line leaving Unit D are attached. The power station area and the neighbouring waste dump of the coal mine Scholven became a film scene in the Tatort "The ball in the body" of 1979.

== History ==
The power station was an enterprise for the covering of the internal requirement at river and steam of the coal mine Scholven. Soon however, a high performance main power station developed from it. In the years 1968 to 1971 the almost identically constructed blocks B to E went into operation, in 1974 and 1975 followed G and H (50% portion of RWE power), 1979 the block F and at the end of 1985 the long-distance heating power station Buer (FWK). Block G was shut down in summer 2001 and Block H finally in summer 2003.

In August 2008, two of the plant's 7 cooling towers were demolished.

== Technical Data ==
Block	fuel	performance (net)	Commissioning	Decommissioning	Systemically important	Decommissioning ordered
1	natural gas	140 MW_{el}	2024			
B	hard coal	345 MW_{el}	1968		31.03.2031	30.11.2024
C	hard coal	345 MW_{el}	1969		31.03.2031	
D	hard coal	345 MW_{el}	1970	2014		
E	hard coal	345 MW_{el}	1971	2014		
F	hard coal	676 MW_{el}	1979	2014		
FWK	hard coal	70 MW_{el}	1985	30.03.2023		
G	oil	640 MW_{el}	1974	2001		
H	oil	640 MW_{el}	1975	2003		

== See also ==
- List of power stations in Germany
- List of tallest chimneys
