= Solarpark Heideblick =

Photovoltaic power station in Heideblick, Germany

- Country: Germany
- Location: Heideblick
- Coordinates: 51°50′N 13°40′E
- Status: Operational
- Commission date: September 2, 2011
- Construction cost: 50 million euros

Solar farm
- Type: Flat-panel PV
- Site area: 55 hectares (136 acres)

Power generation
- Units operational: 115,000
- Nameplate capacity: 27.5 MW_{p}
- Annual net output: 26 GWh

The Solarpark Heideblick is a photovoltaic power station in Heideblick, Germany. It has a capacity of 27.5 megawatts (MW). The solar park was developed and built by Enerparc.

The PV project is built on a former military training field, using ReneSola modules.

== See also ==
- List of photovoltaic power stations
- PV system
- List of photovoltaic power stations
- Solar power in Germany
- Electricity sector in Germany
