= Thierbach Power Station =

Defunct German coal power plant

Coordinates: 51°09′55″N 12°30′07″E

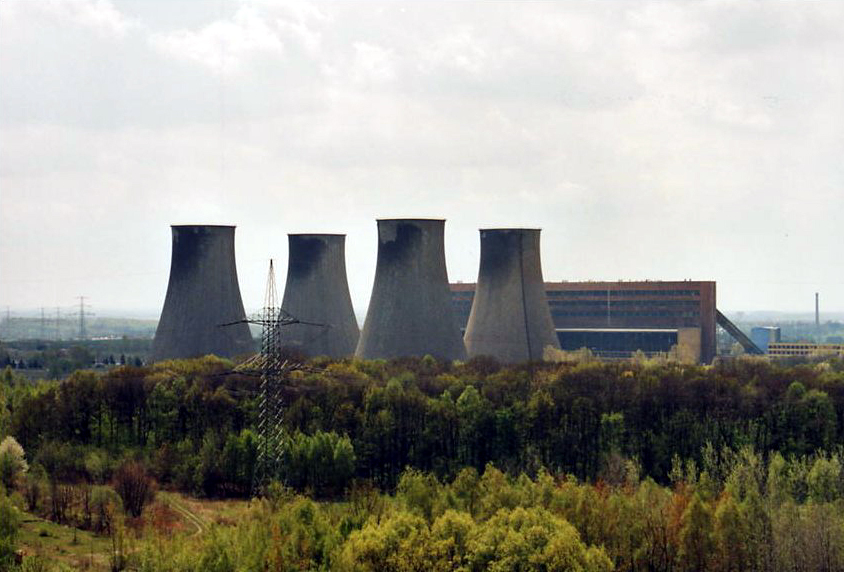
Thierbach power station in 2005

Thierbach Power Station was a brown coal-fired power station in the Leipzig Bay at Espenhain-Thierbach, Germany. It had a 300-metre-tall chimney, which belonged to the tallest free-standing structures of the former GDR (Eastern Germany).
