= Herne Power Plant =

Coal power plant

Coordinates: 51°33′05″N 7°11′20″E

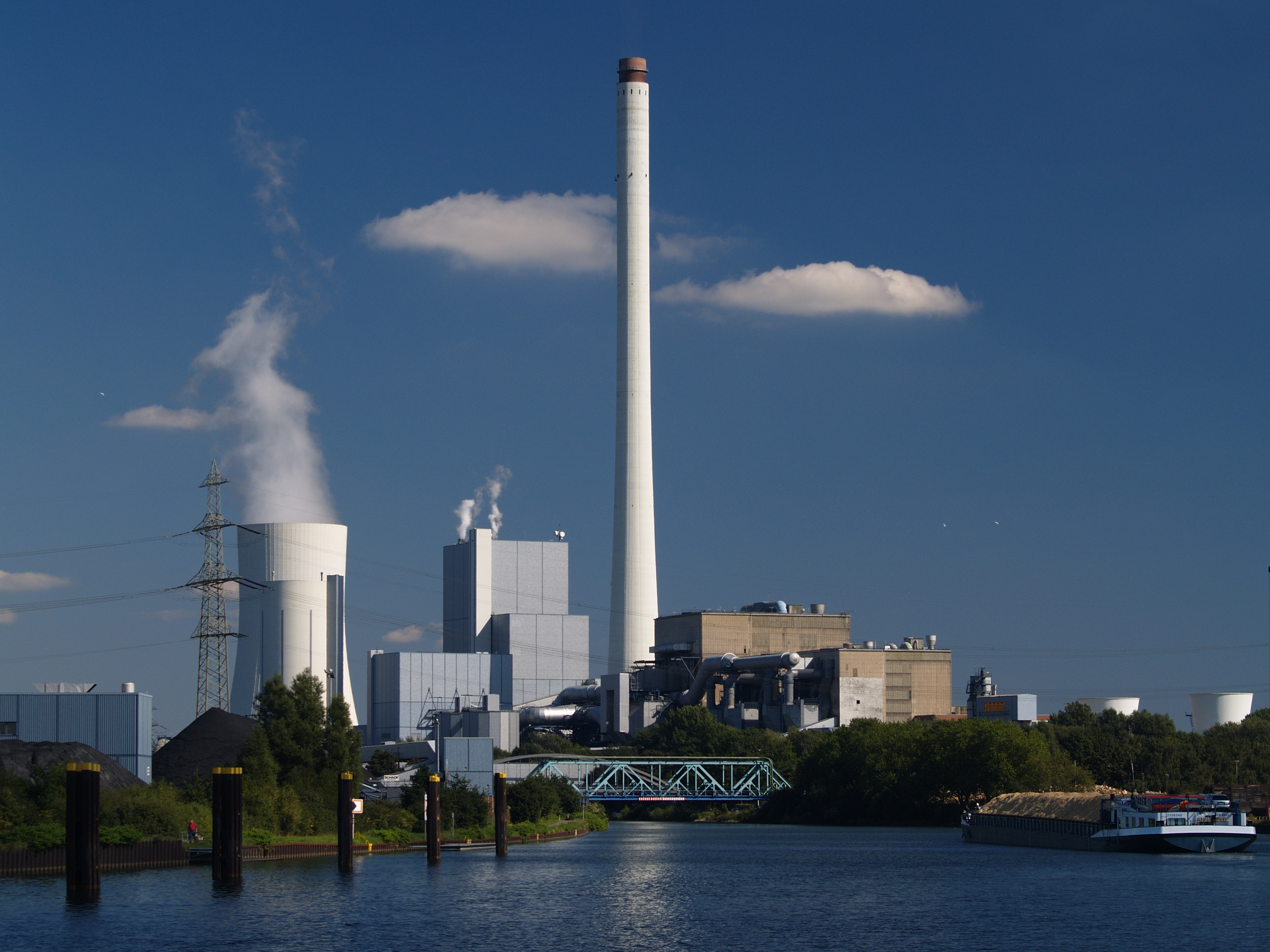
Rhein-Herne Canal

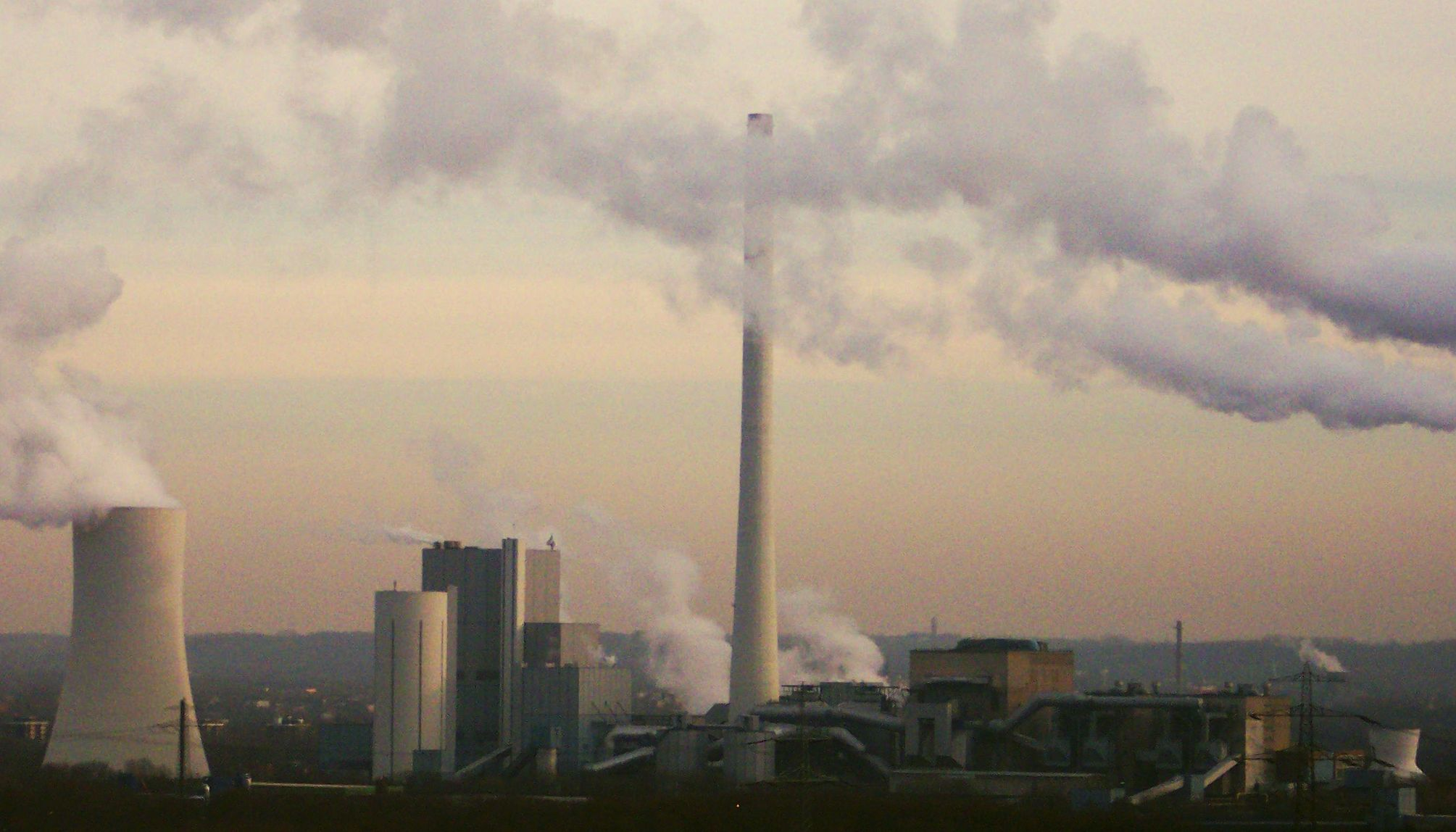
Herne power plant

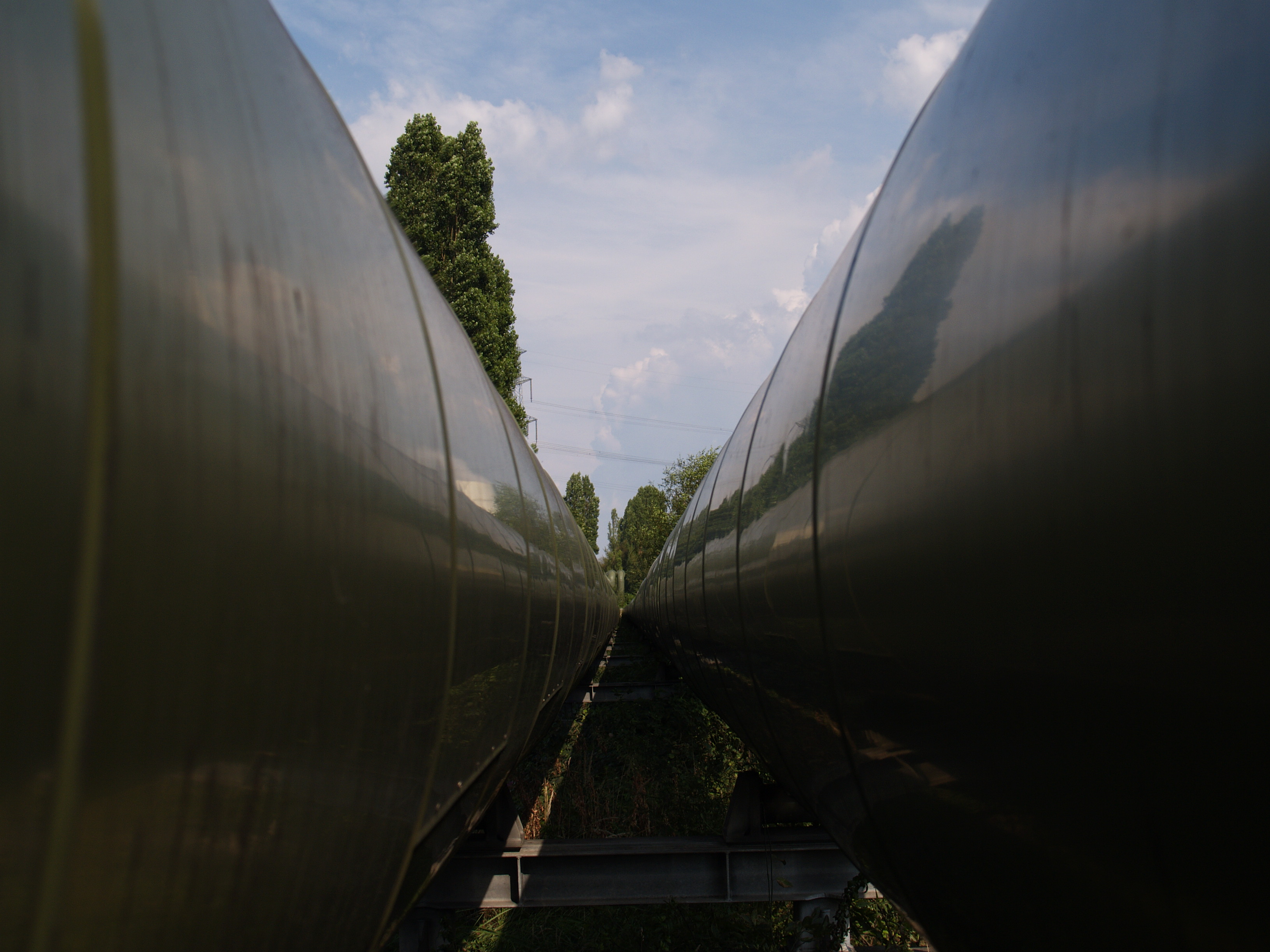
Heating pipeline

Herne power plant is a coal-fired power plant located at Herne in North Rhine-Westphalia, Germany. It was constructed in 1962. The installed capacity of the plant is 950 megawatts. The power plant is owned and operated by Steag GmbH, a subsidiary of Evonik Industries. In 2011, the power station produced 2,501 MWh electrical power and 800 MWh of district heating. Annual coal consumption amounts to approximately 2 million tons.

== Herne 4 ==
On the 27th of July 1989, a fourth unit - Herne 4 - was commissioned, eventually replacing the three older blocks. Herne 4 has a generating capacity of 435 MWh.

During this construction the taller 300-metre-tall (980 ft) chimney and the large cooling tower, whose shape is present in the picture of the power station, were built.
