= Solarpark Eiche =

Photovoltaic power station in Germany

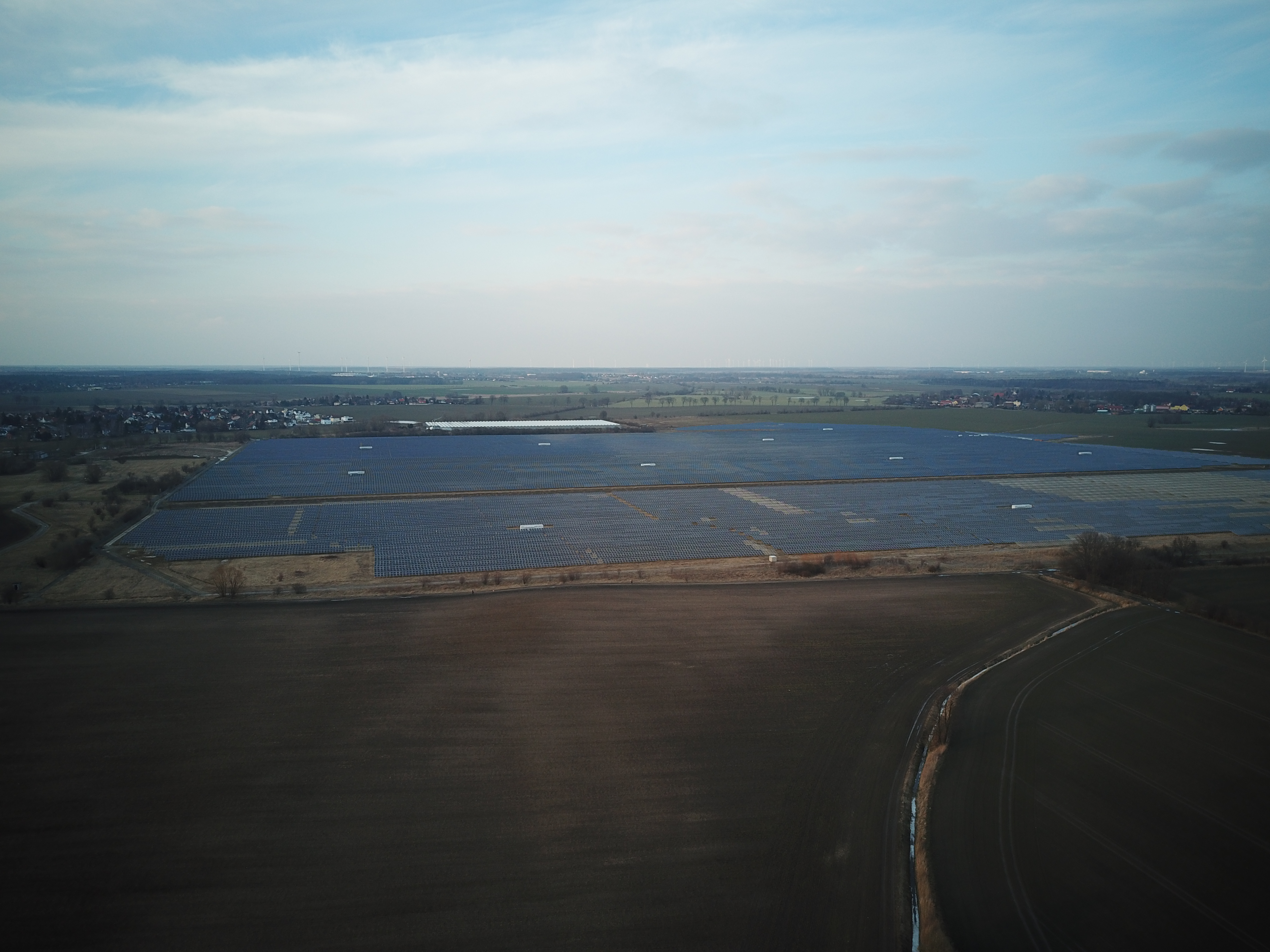
- Solarpark Eiche
- Country: Germany
- Location: Ahrensfelde-Eiche, Brandenburg
- Coordinates: 52°34′N 13°36′E
- Status: Operational
- Construction began: 2010
- Commission date: 2011
- Owner: SYBAC Solar Berlin GmbH

Solar farm
- Type: Flat-panel PV

Power generation
- Nameplate capacity: 26.5 MW_{p}
- Annual net output: 25.97 GWh

Solarpark Eiche is a 26.5-megawatt (MW) photovoltaic power station located in Ahrensfelde‐Eiche, Germany, near the capital Berlin, and covers an area of 73 hectares (180 acres).

== See also ==
- Photovoltaic power station
- PV system
- List of photovoltaic power stations
- Solar power in Germany
- Electricity sector in Germany
