= Tiefstack Power Station =

German power station

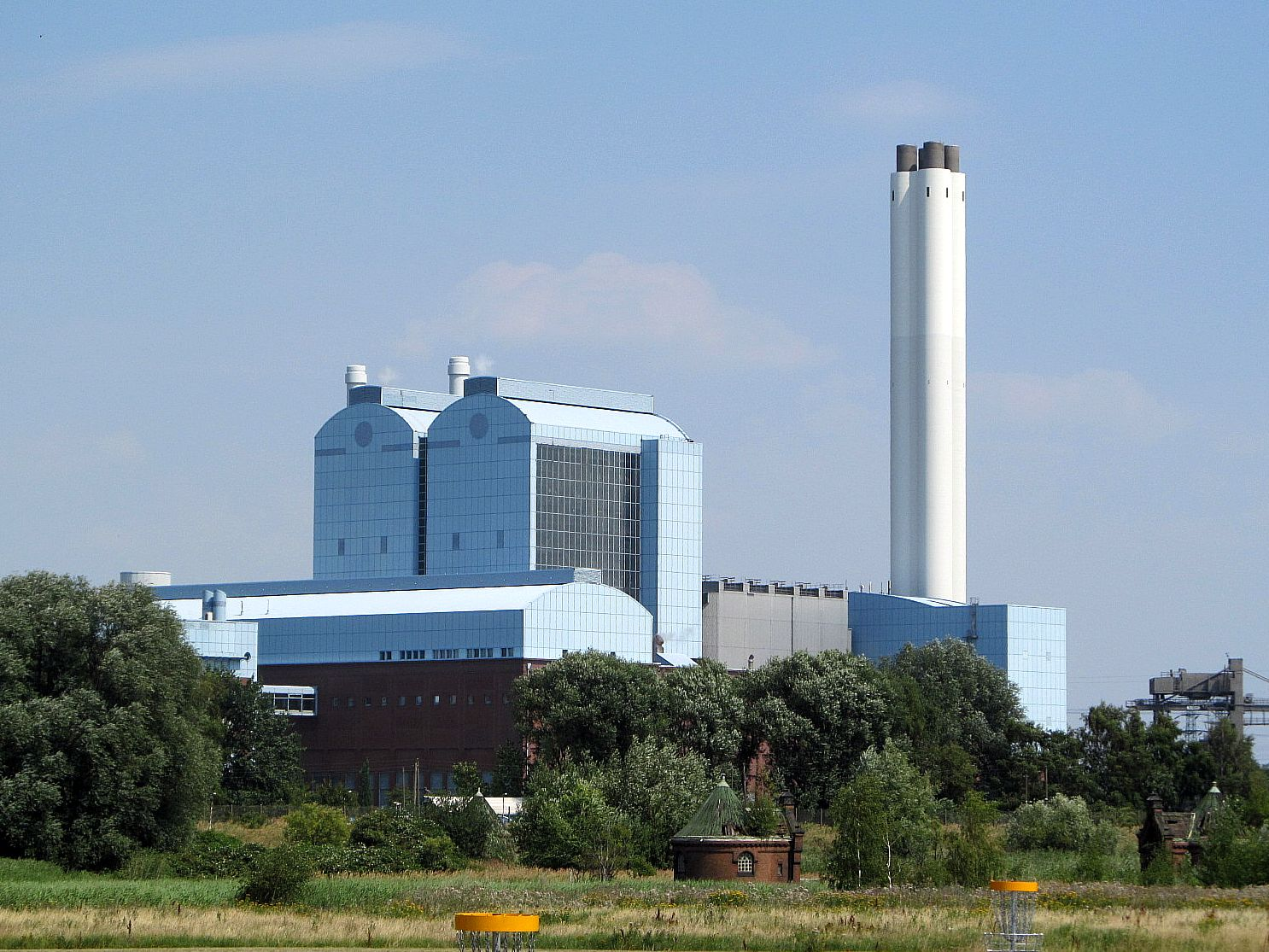
- Tiefstack Power Station (2018)
- Country: Germany
- Location: Hamburg
- Coordinates: 53°31′37″N 10°03′49″E
- Owner: Hamburg
- Operator: Hamburg

Power generation
- Nameplate capacity: 316 MW

External links
- Website: https://waerme.hamburg/erzeugungsanlagen
- Commons: Related media on Commons

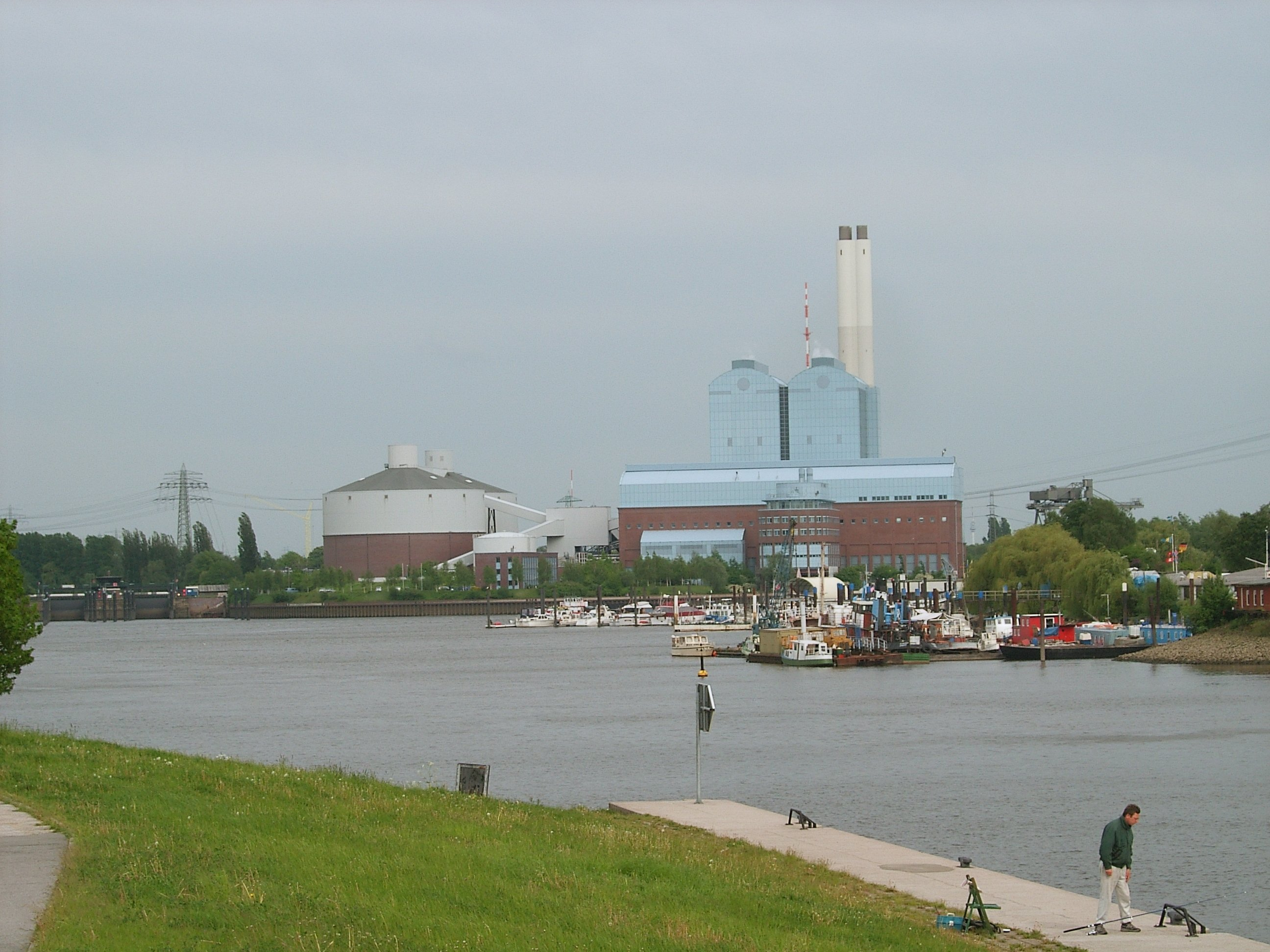
View of power station from Billwerder Bay

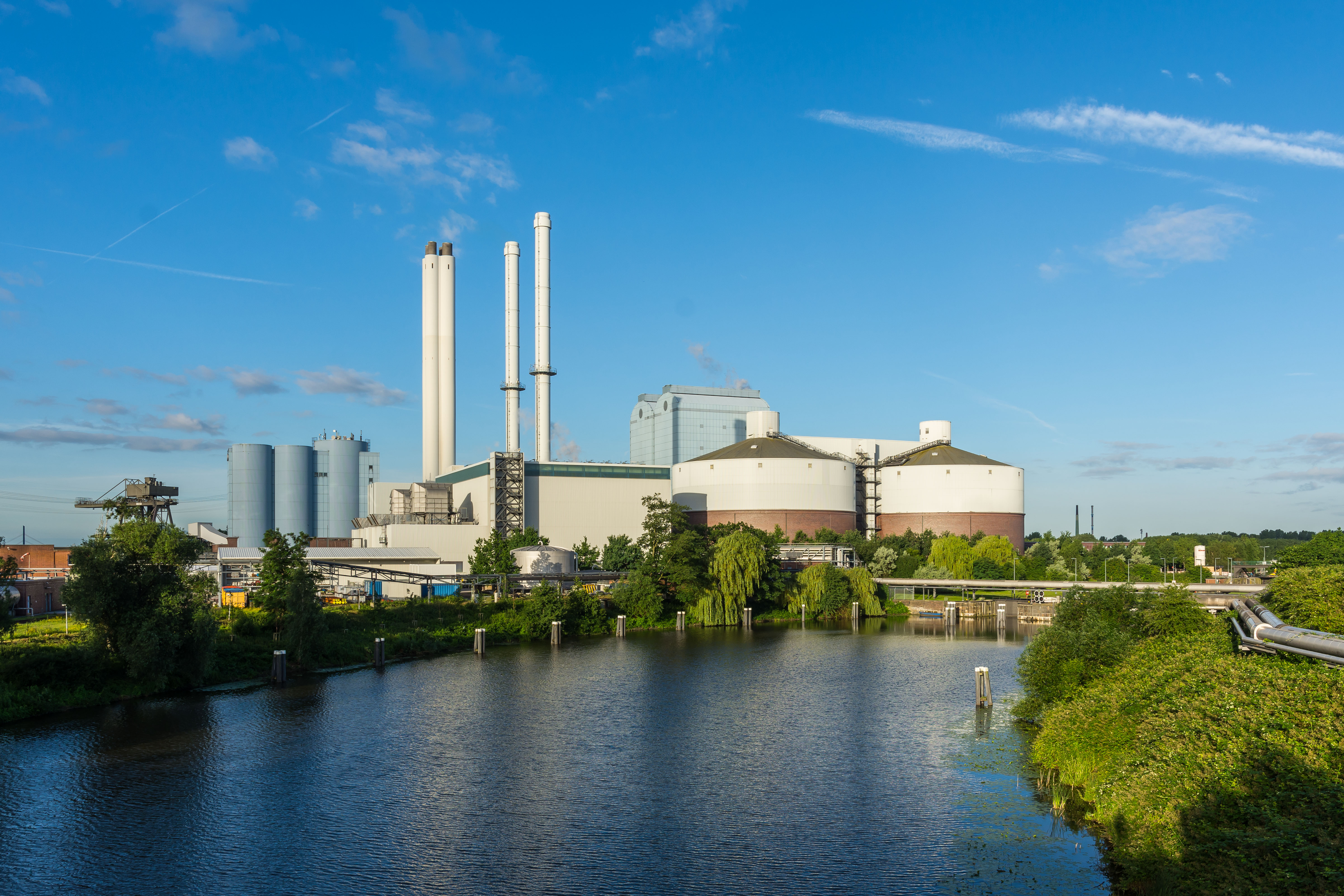
View from Tiefstack canal

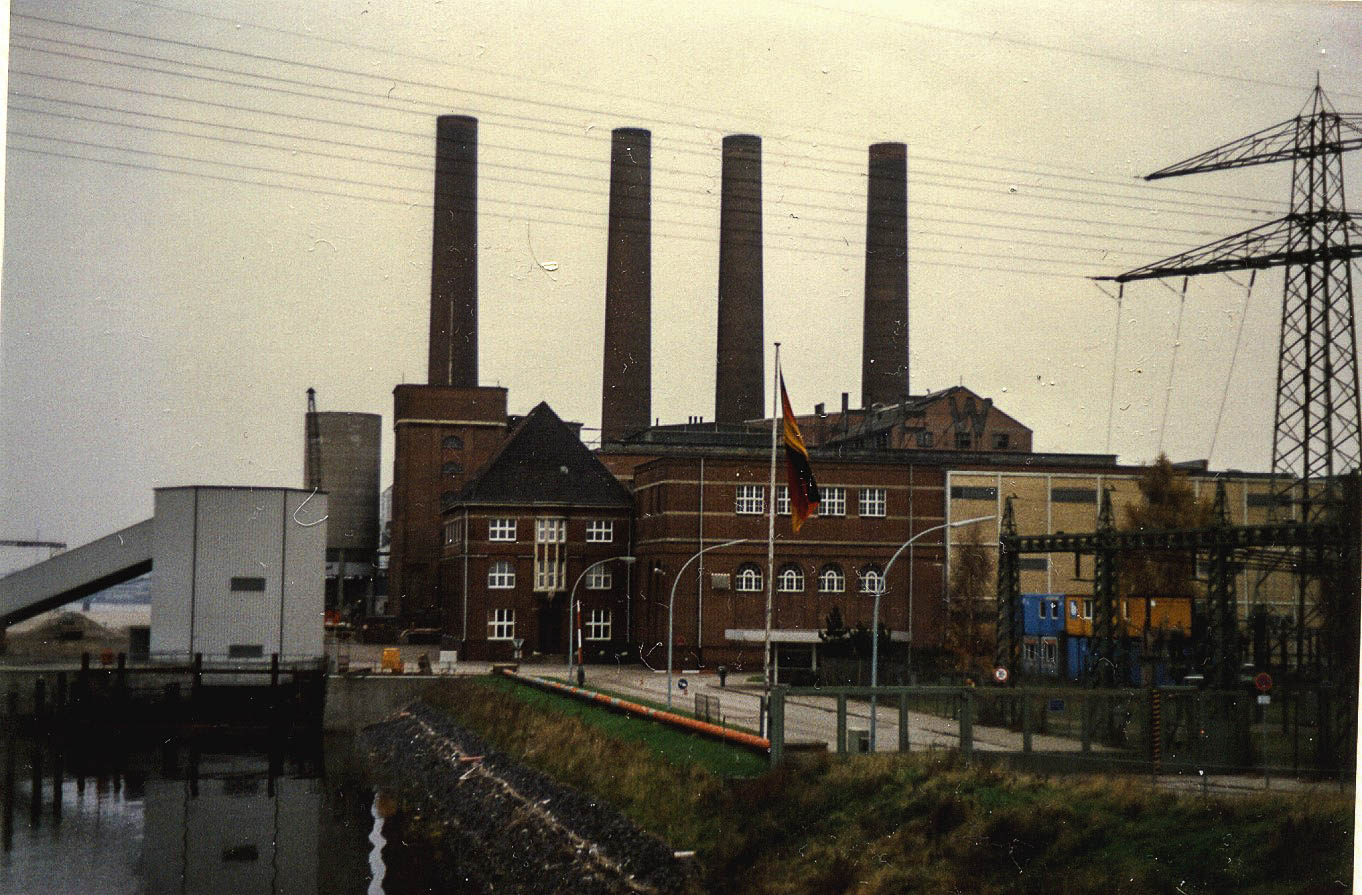
Image of power station in 1986

Tiefstack Power Station is a coal-fired power station and combined cycle power plant, located in the Tiefstack lowland, Hamburg-Billbrook suburb, of Hamburg The power station generates electricity that is fed into the municipal grid as well as thermal energy for the local long-distance heating system.

== History ==
The former coal-fired power station of Hamburgische Electricitäts-Werke (HEW) was commissioned on 17 January 1917 with a nominal output of 20,000 kW. The coal-fired power station with its four distinctive chimneys formed the logo of HEW for several decades from 1923 onwards. The construction of the power plant was started in 1914. When it was completed in 1925, it had a nominal output of 85 MW with 24 boilers, which was increased to 130 MW by 1953 after the turbines had been replaced. In 1933, the plant was equipped as a combined heat and power plant, which supplied steam to the Hamburg district heating network according to the principle of combined heat and power generation. In 1950, the plant was modernised into a high-pressure power station. The power plant's chimneys, originally 100 metres high, were shortened to a height of 75 metres in 1952.

From 1984, a combined heat and power plant with hard coal firing was built next to the power plant on an area washed up with sand from the North Elbe, which went into operation in 1993. In the same year the old power station was shut down and demolished by the mid-1990s. The new power plant has been in operation since the takeover of HEW by Vattenfall Europe Heat. On the site of the coal-fired power plant, an additional 125 MW combined-cycle gas turbine power plant was commissioned in 2009, which burns natural gas. The gasometer deep stack built in the 1930s was demolished in 1986.

== Deactivation 2030 ==
The Tiefstack power plant is to be shut down by 2030. It has not yet been clarified how the City of Hamburg intends to replace the Tiefstack combined heat and power plant. One alternative would be to use the industrial waste heat from companies in the Port of Hamburg, including the copper producer Aurubis, the aluminium producer Trimet Aluminium and the steel group ArcelorMittal. Thermal recycling of waste is also considered an option.

Other sources report that the Tiefstack power plant is to be replaced by an "energy park port" with a gas-fired power plant, which is to be located south of the Elbe.This energy park port is to replace not only the Tiefstack power plant, which will be shut down by 2030 at the latest, but also the 60-year-old Wedel power plant, which will be shut down in 2025.
