= Bexbach Power Station =

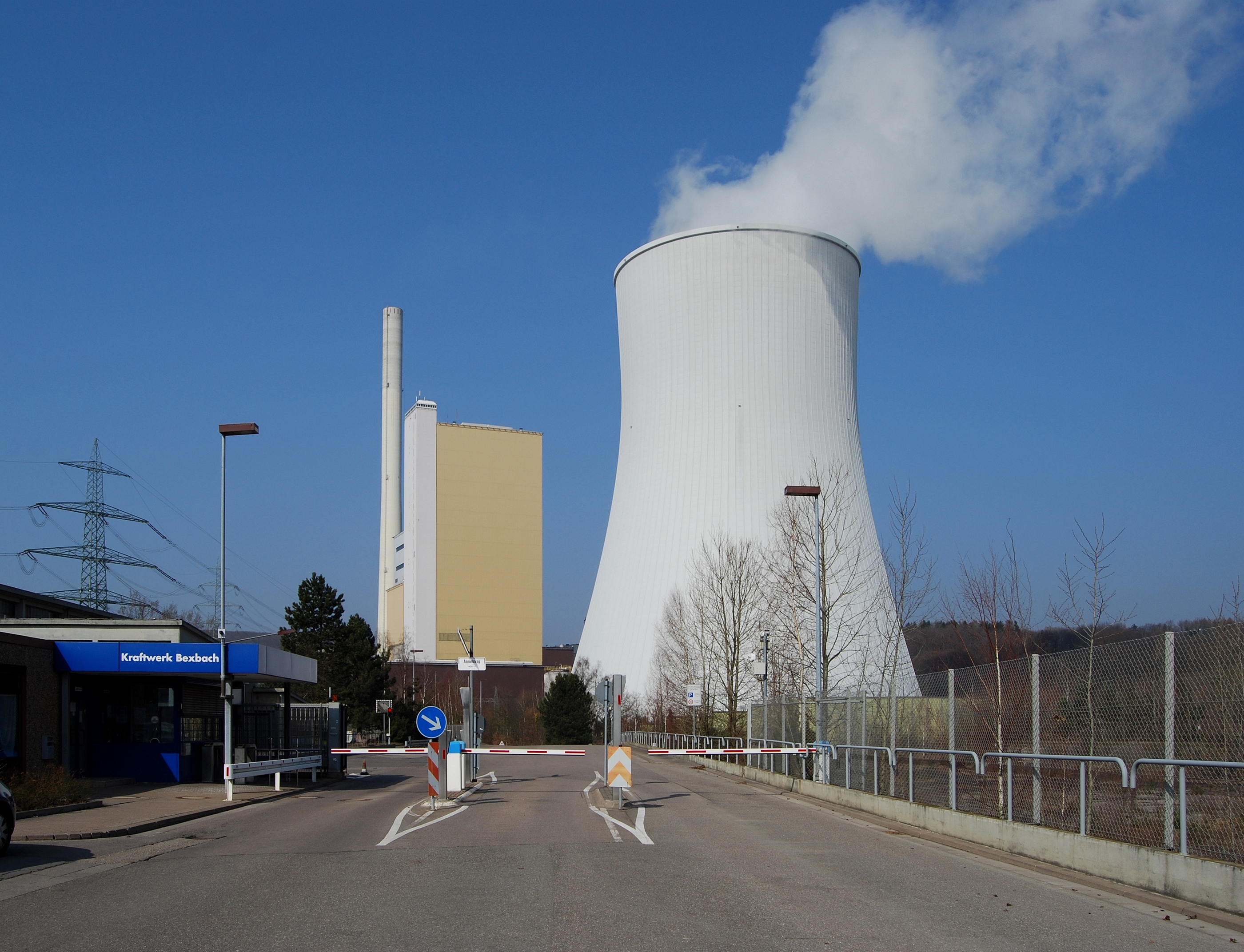
- Country: Germany
- Location: Bexbach
- Coordinates: 49°21′47″N 7°14′16″E
- Status: Operational
- Commission date: 1953
- Owner: Evonik Industries

Thermal power station
- Primary fuel: Coal

Power generation
- Nameplate capacity: 773 MW

External links
- Commons: Related media on Commons

Bexbach Power Station is a coal-fired power station in the Bexbach municipality of Saarland, Germany. It has an output capacity of 773 megawatts. The chimney of the power station is 240 metres high. It can store up to 200,000 tons of coal.

The first power station in Bexbach, called the St. Barbara, was inaugurated in 1953. It had a capacity of only 100 MW. In 1979 construction of today's facility began. It became operational in 1983.

75% of the power plant is owned by KBV Bexbach Verwaltungsgesellschaft mbH (EnBW Kraftwerke AG 2/3; STEAG Power Saar GmbH 1/3) and 25% is owned by EnBW Kraftwerke AG.
