= Köthen Solar Park =

Photovoltaic power station in Köthen, Germany

- Country: Germany
- Location: Köthen
- Coordinates: 51°43′33″N 11°58′26″E
- Construction began: May 2008
- Commission date: December 2008
- Construction cost: €133 million

Solar farm
- Type: Flat-panel PV
- Site area: 116 ha (287 acres)

Power generation
- Units operational: 205,000 crystalline photovoltaic modules of BP Solar
- Nameplate capacity: 45 MW_{p}
- Annual net output: 42 GWh

The Köthen Solar Park is a photovoltaic power station in Köthen, Germany. It has a capacity of 45 megawatts (MW) and an expected annual electricity generation of 42 gigawatt-hours. The solar park was developed and built by RGE Energy.

The PV project is built on a former military airfield in Köthen on 116 hectares (290 acres). In 2009, the project was the largest solar power plant in Saxony-Anhalt and the world's largest system using string inverters. The project is equipped with 205,000 solar module made of crystalline silicon by BP Solar. Total investment in the project was around €133 million. The solar park was connected to the grid in 2009. Payment was fixed to 35.49 Euro-cents per kilowatt-hour for 20 years.
