= Marl-Chemiepark Power Station =

Coordinates: 51°41′07″N 7°06′10″E

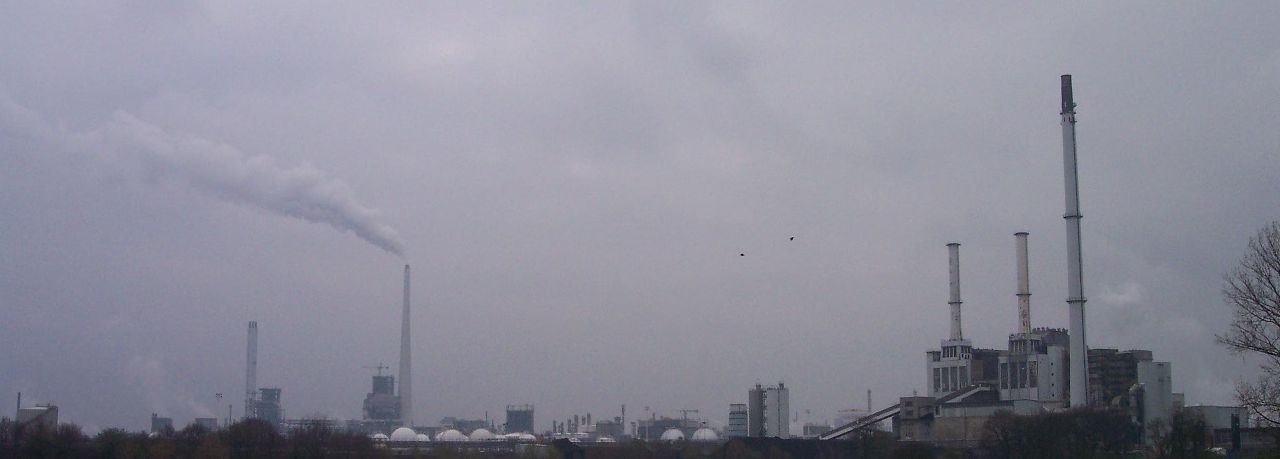

Marl-Chemiepark Power Station is an ensemble of three thermal power stations. One of these power stations has a 300 meters tall, another a 241 meters tall chimney.

The 300 meters chimney was demolished in 1995, using a special excavator.
