= Lauingen Energy Park =

Photovoltaic power station in Germany

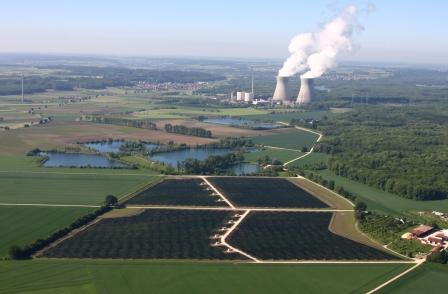
- Lauingen Energy Park
- Country: Germany
- Location: Lauingen
- Coordinates: 48°32′13″N 10°25′27″E
- Status: Operational
- Construction began: 2008
- Commission date: June 2010

Solar farm
- Type: Flat-panel PV
- Site area: 63 ha (155.7 acres)

Power generation
- Units operational: 306,084 (288,132 First Solar; 17,952 Yingli)
- Nameplate capacity: 25.7 MW
- Capacity factor: 12.0%
- Annual net output: 26.98 GWh

The Lauingen Energy Park is a 25.7–megawatt (MW) photovoltaic power station, located in Bavarian Swabia, Germany. It covers an area of 63 hectares (155.7 acres) and was commissioned in June 2010.

The project was built in three phases:

- The 10.0 MW Helmeringen 1 (already commissioned in 2009)
- The 9.4 MW Helmeringen 2
- The 6.3 MW Helmeringen 3 (built and commissioned in 2010)

The largest solar power station in Swabia was built by the German company Gehrlicher Solar and features the following key figures:

- 288,132 thin-film modules using cadmium telluride photovoltaics (CdTe PV) manufactured by U.S. company First Solar
- 17,952 conventional solar panels based using crystalline silicon photovoltaics manufactured by Chinese company Yingli
- 18 SMA solar inverters
- 3 Siemens central inverters
- a total of 664 km solar cable trays
- a projected generation of almost 27 million kilowatt-hours (kWh)
- an avoided 14,353 tons of CO_{2} per year
- powers about 7,500 average households with clean energy, where average means a three-person household with an annual electricity consumption of 3,500 kWh.

== Gallery ==
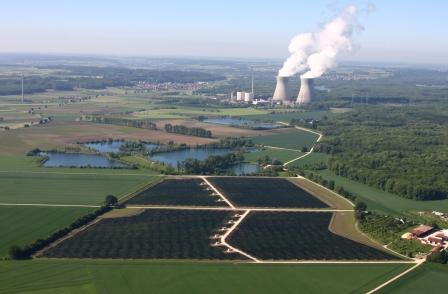

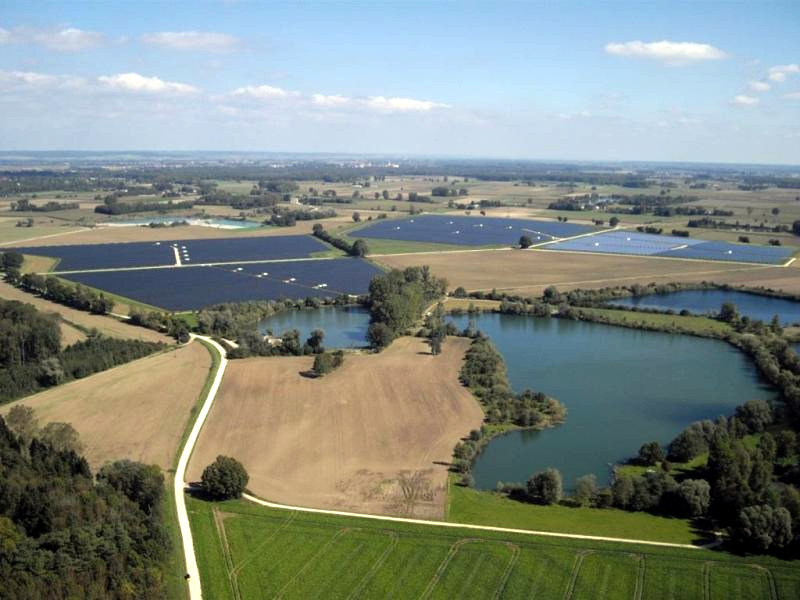

== See also ==
- Photovoltaics
- Photovoltaic power station
- List of largest power stations in the world
- Solar power in Germany
