= Wilhelmshaven Power Station =

Wilhelmshaven Power Station (E.ON)
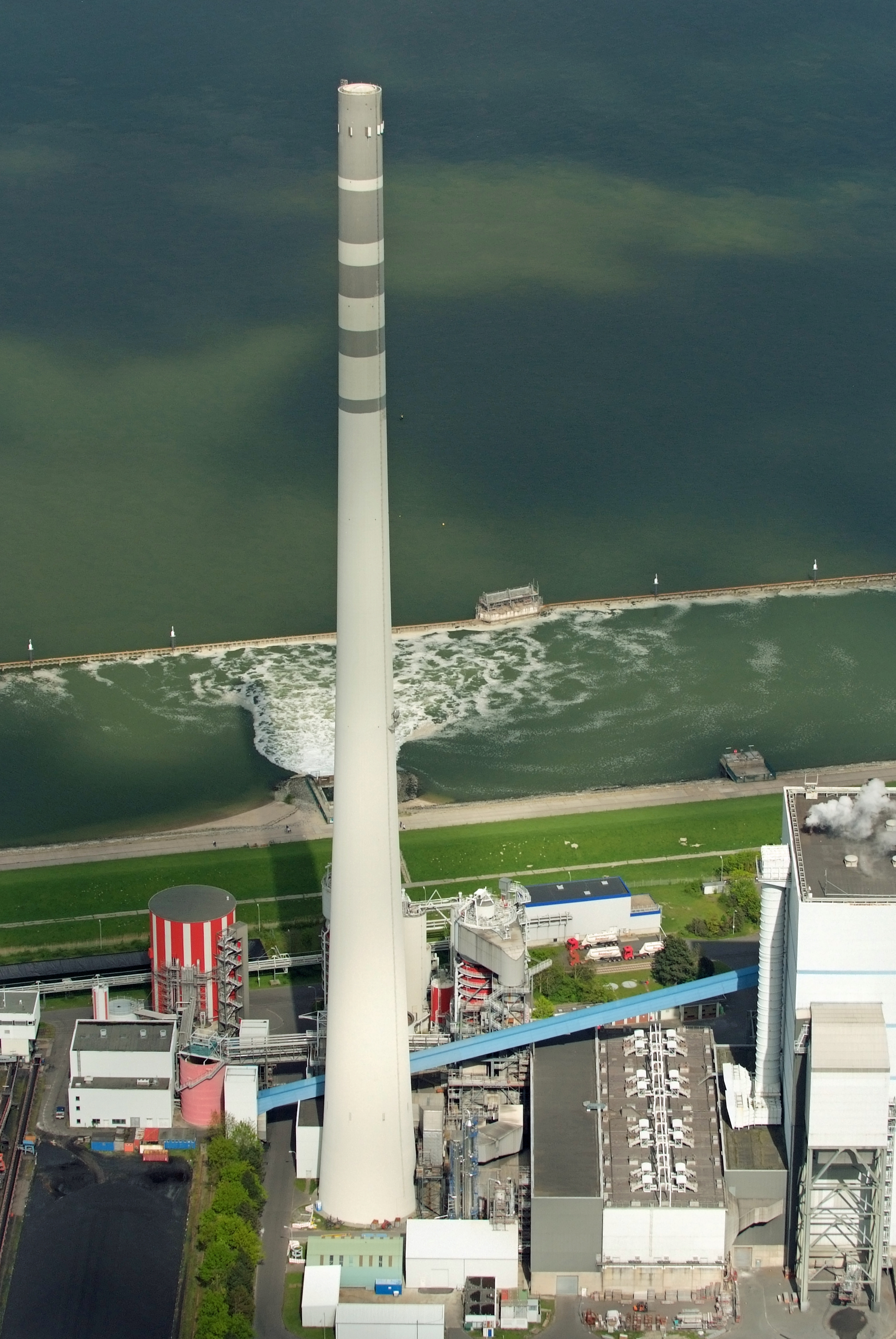
- Aerial view of the power station (May 2012)
- Country: Germany
- Location: Rüstersieler Groden
- Coordinates: 53°33′52.4″N 8°8′47″E
- Commission date: 1976
- Operator: Uniper

Thermal power station
- Primary fuel: Fossil Fuel: Coal

Power generation
- Nameplate capacity: 756 MW

External links
- Commons: Related media on Commons

The Wilhelmshaven Power Station were coal power stations in the city of Wilhelmshaven, Germany. Built in the middle of the 1970s, the power station has an output of 747 megawatts.

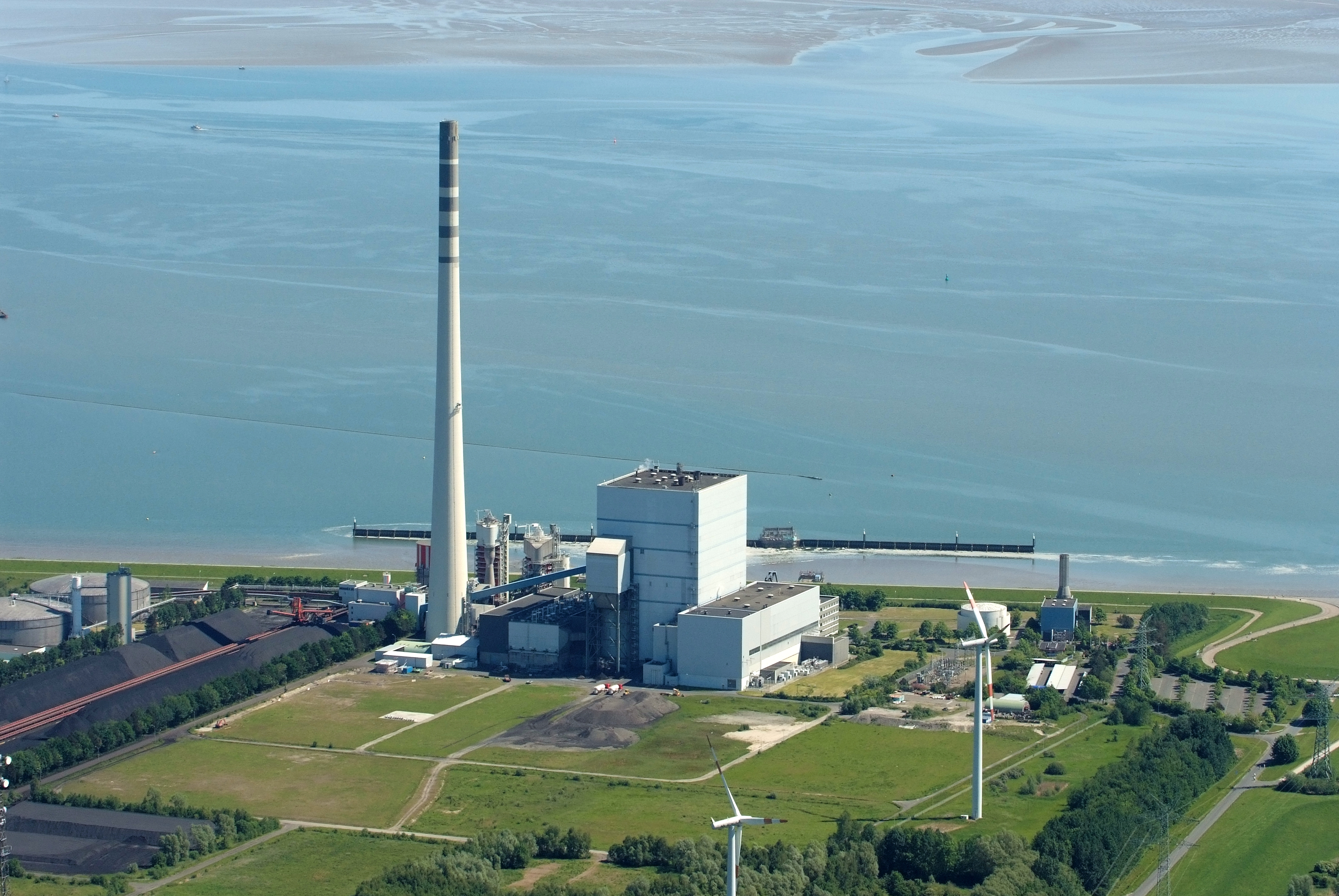
The Power Station seen from West

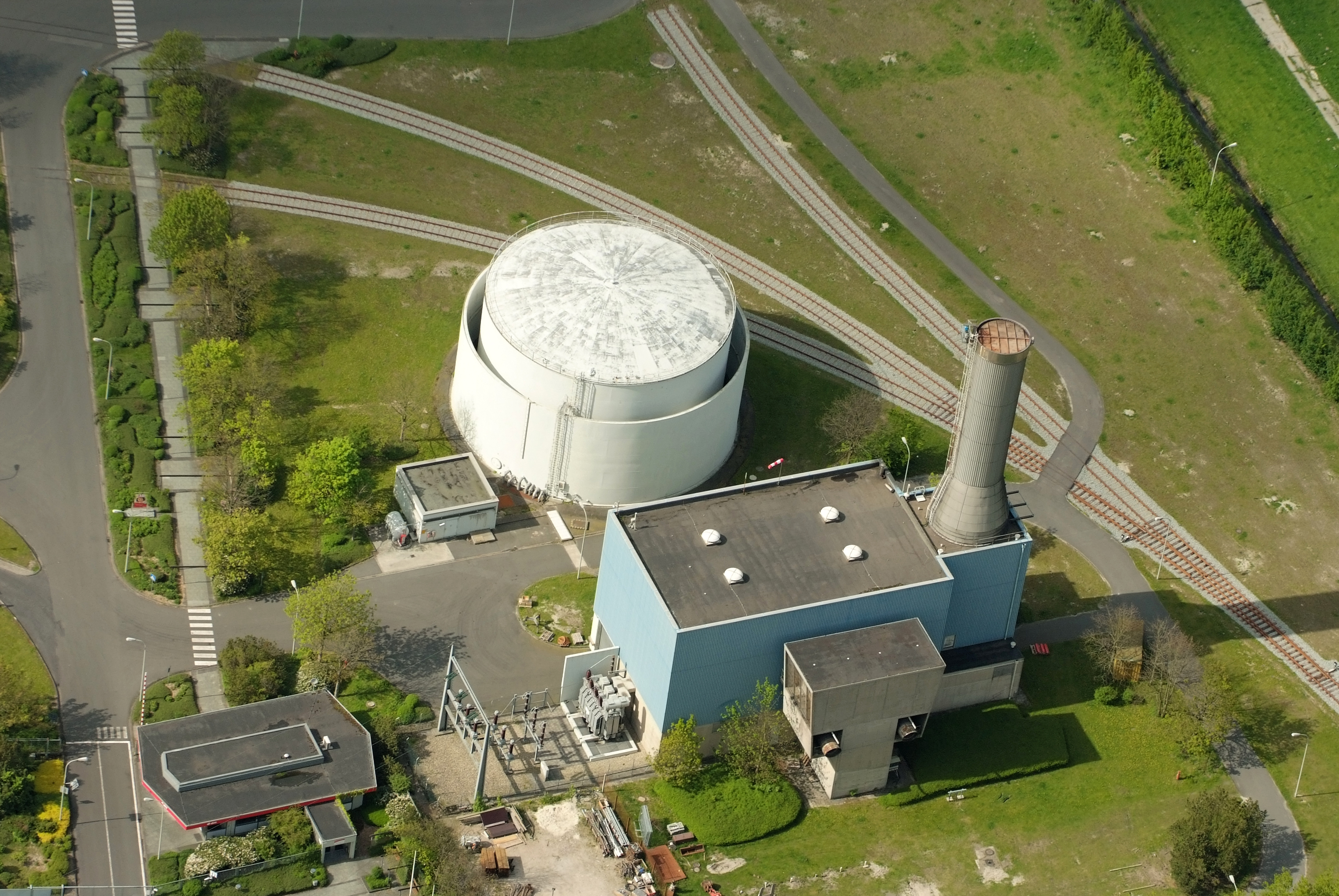

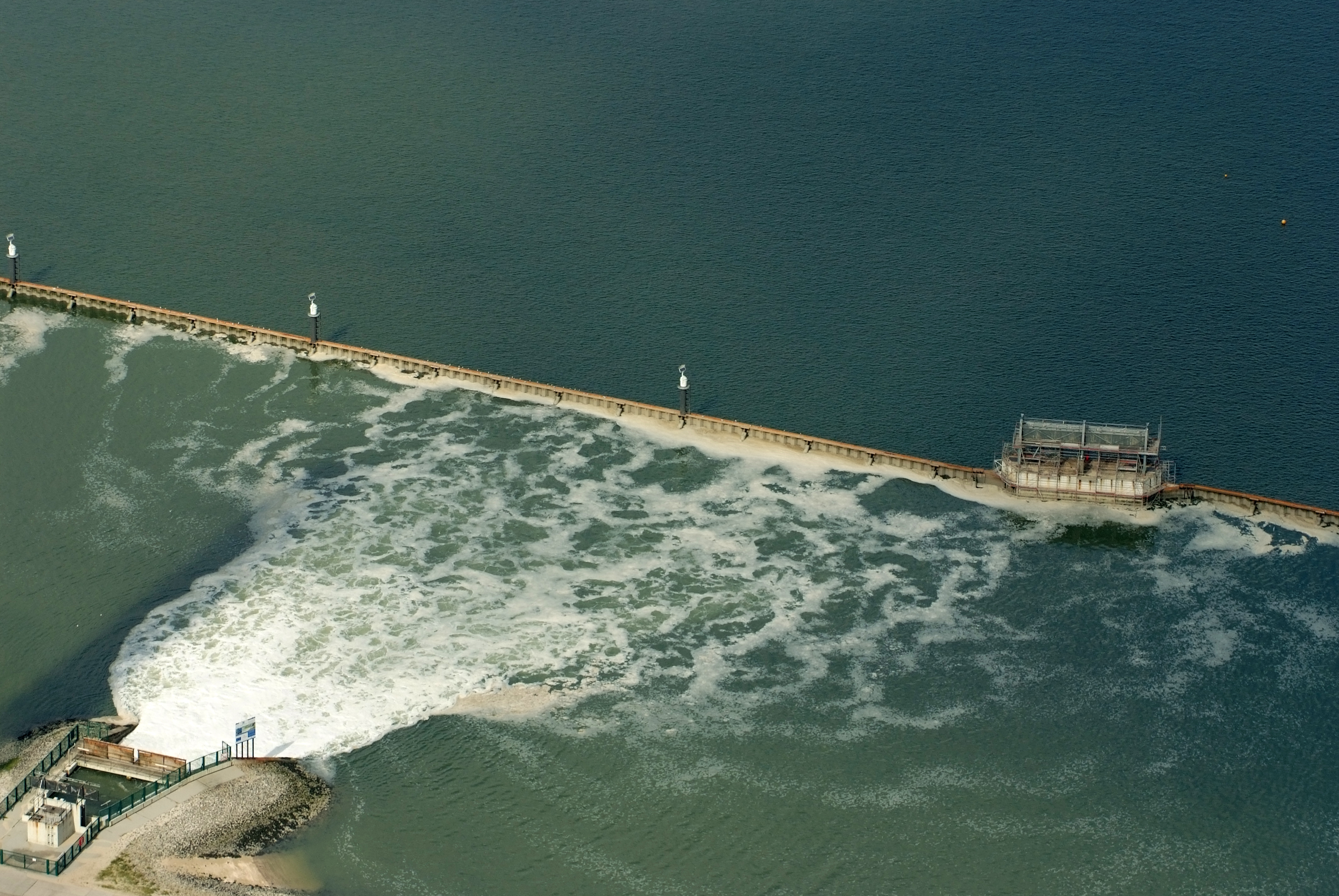
Run-off water in the Jade Bight

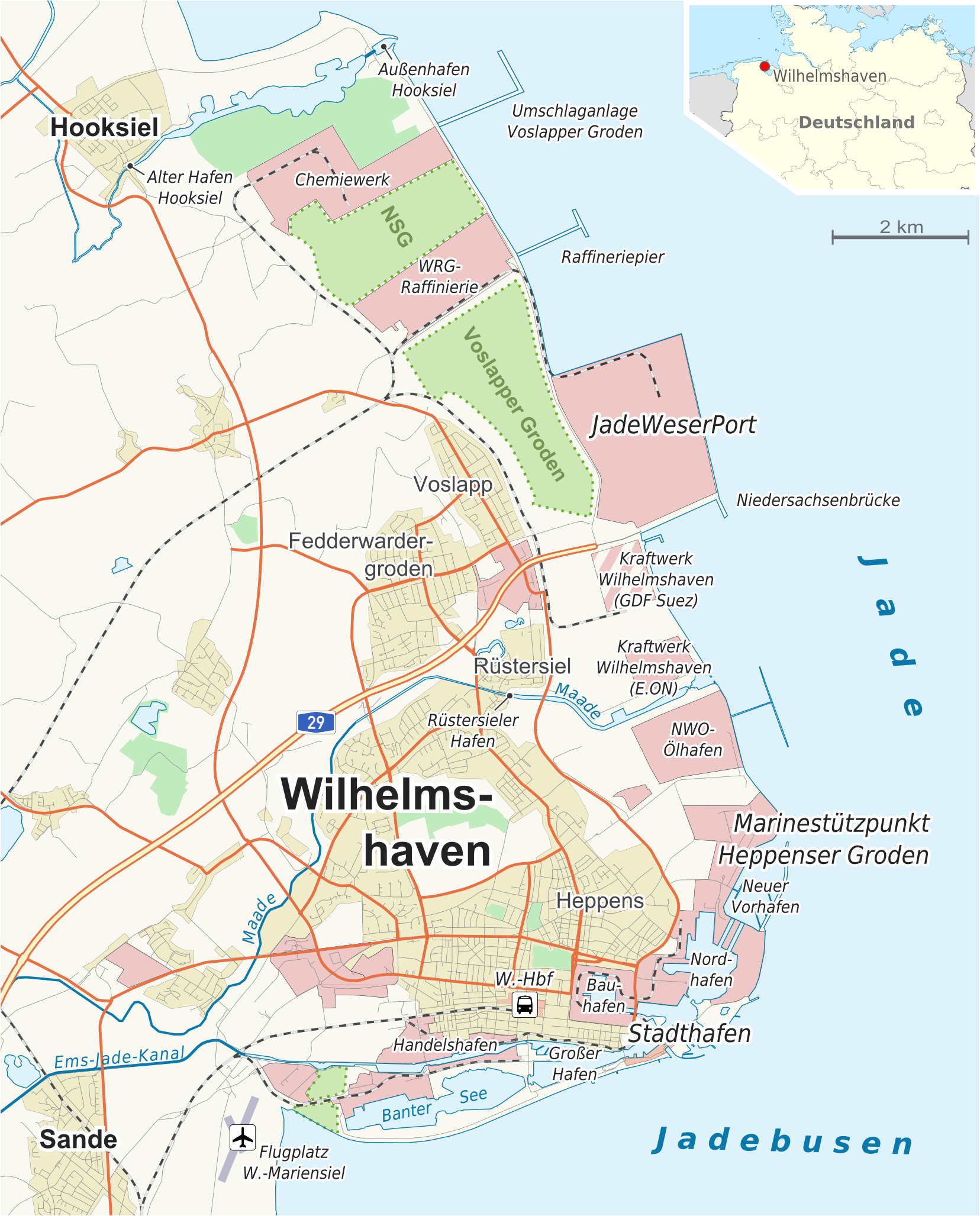
Map
