= Großkrotzenburg Power Station =

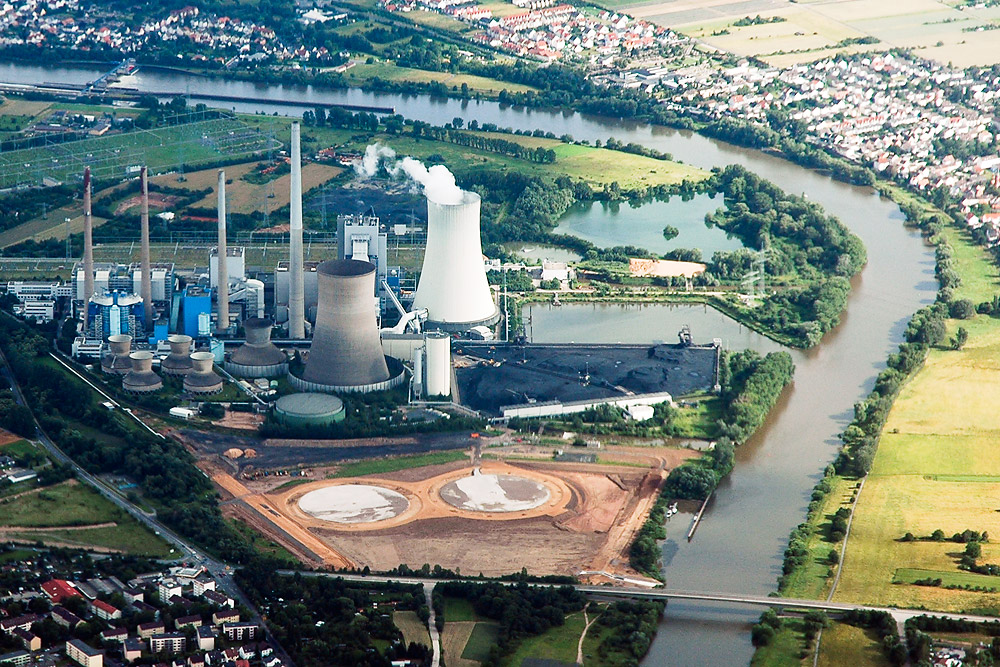
- Großkrotzenburg power station from air
- Country: Germany
- Location: Hesse
- Coordinates: 50°05′17″N 8°57′08″E
- Commission date: 1977; 1992
- Owner: Uniper

Thermal power station
- Primary fuel: Coal

Power generation
- Units operational: 1
- Nameplate capacity: 1132 MW

External links
- Commons: Related media on Commons

Großkrotzenburg Power Station (German: Kraftwerk Staudinger) is a modern coal-fired thermal power station in Großkrotzenburg, Hesse, east of Frankfurt, Germany. It comprises five units with a total capacity of approximately 1900 MW. The units were built between 1965 and 1992. Units 1-3 were decommissioned in 2012 and 2013. A characteristic of this power station is the fact that the most recently built unit, Unit 5, uses the updraught from the existing cooling towers as stack. The power station is operated by Uniper.

== Technical information ==
Großkrotenzburg Power Station consists of 5 units, of which only Unit 5 is operated regularly. A 6th unit was planned, but was cancelled in 2012 for economic reasons.

Thermal units of Großkrotenzburg Power Station
Unit	Fuel	Net output	Commissioned	Decommissioned	Purpose
1	Coal	246 MW	1965	2012 (Kept in reserve for district heating until April 30 2013)	Load Following, District Heating
2	Coal	249 MW	1965	2001 (Cold reserve until 2012)	Load Following, District Heating
3	Coal	293 MW	1970	2012	Load Following
4	Natural Gas, Heating Oil	622 MW	1977	2012 (In Federal Network Agency reserve until 2018)	Peak Load
5	Coal	510 MW	1992	Still in Service	Base Load, District Heating
6	Coal	1055 MW	Cancelled		Base Load, District Heating
