= Pocking Solar Park =

Solar park in pocking, Germany

- Country: Germany
- Location: Pocking
- Coordinates: 48°22′4″N 13°17′55″E
- Construction began: 2005
- Commission date: 2006
- Owners: Martin Bucher Projektentwicklungen; Shell Solar; CommerzLeasing und Immobilien

Solar farm
- Type: Flat-panel PV
- Site area: 7.5 ha (18.5 acres)

Power generation
- Units operational: 57,912 Shell Solar
- Nameplate capacity: 10 MW_{p}
- Capacity factor: 13 %

The Pocking Solar Park is a photovoltaic power station in Pocking, Lower Bavaria, Germany. It has installed capacity of 10 megawatts. Construction and assembly of the power plant begun in August 2005 and was completed in March 2006.

The power plant is located on 7.5 hectares (19 acres) on the former military training area. It has 57,912 modules.

== See also ==
- Energy policy of the European Union
- Renewable energy commercialization
- Renewable energy in Germany
