= Nuclear power in Germany =

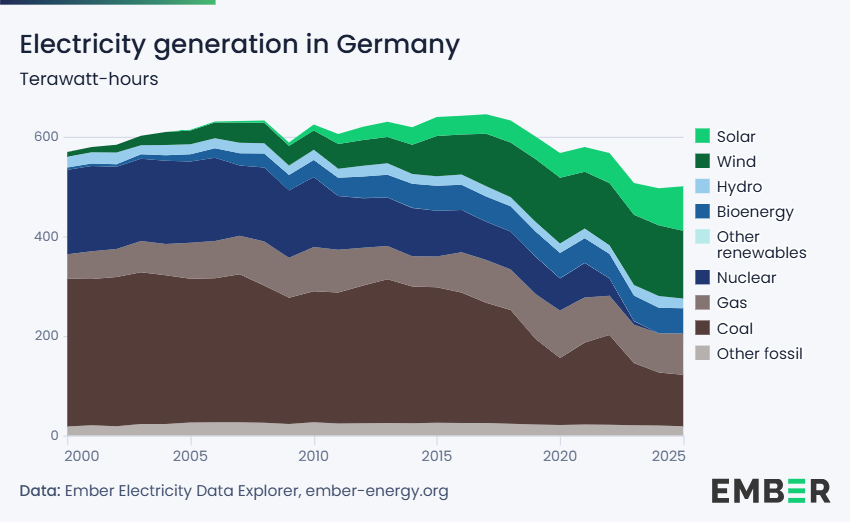
Electricity generation in Germany by source in Twh

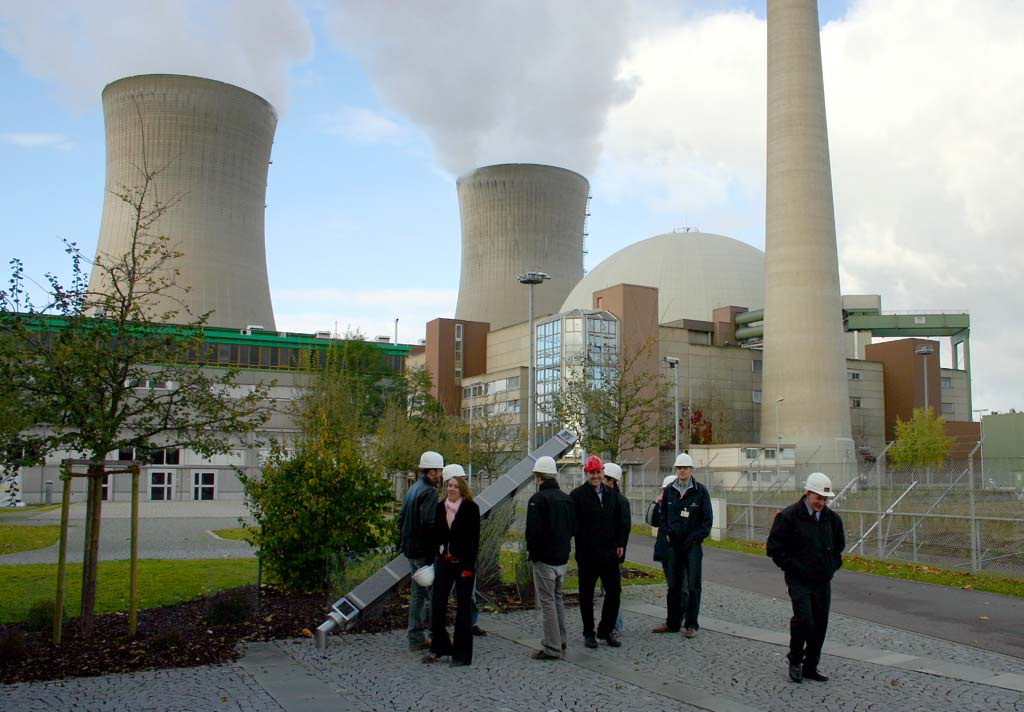
The Grafenrheinfeld Nuclear Power Plant in Germany, which was shut down in 2015

Nuclear power was used in Germany from the 1960s until it was fully phased out in April 2023.

German nuclear power began with research reactors in the 1950s and 1960s, with the first commercial plant coming online in 1969. By 1990, nuclear power accounted for about a quarter of the electricity produced in the country. Nuclear power accounted for 13.3% of German electricity supply in 2021, supplied by six power plants. Three of these were switched off at the end of 2021, and the other three ceased operations by April 2023.

The anti-nuclear movement in Germany has a long history dating back to the early 1970s and intensified following the Chernobyl disaster in 1986. After the March 2011 Fukushima nuclear disaster and subsequent anti-nuclear protests, the government announced that it would close all of its nuclear power plants by 2022. Eight of the 17 operating reactors in Germany were permanently shut down following Fukushima.

While nuclear power was gradually phased out of the German power mix, Germany increased its use of fossil fuel energy by 7% over the period 2002–2022, with a massive increase in usage of natural gas and only modest reductions of coal power and oil power. By some estimates, Germany could have achieved a 73% reduction in its carbon emissions by retaining nuclear power during the period 2002–2022 and could have saved €696 billion on its energy transition.

== History ==
=== Early nuclear research in Germany ===
Prior to the takeover of Nazi Germany, German universities were the employers of some of the world's most renowned nuclear physicists, including Albert Einstein, Otto Hahn, Lise Meitner, Leo Szilard, and others. In 1938, Hahn and his colleague Fritz Straßmann conducted an experiment designed by Lise Meitner (who had already been driven into exile due to her Jewish ancestry), which led to the discovery of nuclear fission. Soon thereafter, a "race" began between the soon-to-be belligerents of World War II to find military or civilian applications of the new technology. Hampered by infighting, lack of resources, mistakes, and the suspicion of Nazi authorities against "Jewish physics", the Uranverein ("uranium club") led by Werner Heisenberg never got close to building a Uranmaschine ("uranium machine"—what the Americans called a "pile") that achieved criticality, let alone building a nuclear weapon. When the Americans took over the last German attempt at a research reactor during the war at Haigerloch in southwestern Germany, it was clear to the people involved in the Alsos Mission that Germany had fallen behind the Manhattan Project to a considerable degree.

=== First nuclear power plants ===
As in many industrialised countries, nuclear power in Germany was first developed in the late 1950s. Only a few experimental reactors went online before 1960, and an experimental nuclear power station in Kahl am Main opened in 1960. All of the German nuclear power plants that opened between 1960 and 1970 had, as in the rest of the world at that time, a power output of less than 1,000 MW and have now all closed down. The first almost fully commercial nuclear power plant started operating in 1969; Obrigheim operated until 2005, when it was shut down by a phaseout decision of the government. The first stations with a power output of more than 1000 MW each were the two units of the Biblis Nuclear Power Plant in 1974 and 1976.

In the early 1960s, there was a proposal to build a nuclear power station in West Berlin, but the project was dropped in 1962. Another attempt to site a reactor in a major city was made in 1967, when BASF planned to build a nuclear power station on its grounds at Ludwigshafen to supply process steam. The project was withdrawn by BASF.

=== Attempts at developing a closed fuel-cycle and breeding reactors ===
A closed nuclear fuel cycle was planned, starting with mining operations in the Saarland and the Schwarzwald; uranium ore concentration, fuel rod filling production in Hanau; and reprocessing of the spent fuel in the never-built nuclear fuel reprocessing plant at Wackersdorf. The radioactive waste was intended to be stored in a deep geological repository as part of the Gorleben long-term storage project. Today, there is a "ergebnisoffener" searching process over the whole country for the storage of the irradiated nuclear fuel.

In 1959, 15 municipal electric companies established the Association of Experimental Reactor GmbH (Arbeitsgemeinschaft Versuchsreaktor, AVR) to demonstrate the feasibility and viability of a gas-cooled, graphite-moderated high temperature reactor (HTGR). In the early 1960s, it started the design and construction of AVR at the Jülich Research Centre. The first criticality was attained in 1966, and the AVR was in operation for more than 22 years. Despite the fact that fuel feed and discharge system showed excellent availability, the AVR was shut down for political reasons in 1988. The AVR was designed to breed uranium-233 from thorium-232. Thorium-232 is over 100 times as abundant in the Earth's crust as uranium-235.

In 1965, before the AVR started operation, a basic design for a commercial demonstration HTGR reactor using thorium was started, the THTR-300. The HTGR, rated at 300 MW_{e}, synchronised with the grid in 1985. Six months later, a fuel pebble became lodged in the reactor core. After repairs, it was restarted and operated in July 1986, reaching full power in September 1986. It operated until September 1988 and was shut down in September 1989.

=== Early opposition and reactor closures ===
In the early 1970s, large public demonstrations prevented the construction of a nuclear plant at Wyhl. The Wyhl protests were an example of a local community challenging the nuclear industry through a strategy of direct action and civil disobedience. The police were accused of using unnecessarily violent means. Anti-nuclear success at Wyhl inspired nuclear opposition throughout Germany and elsewhere.

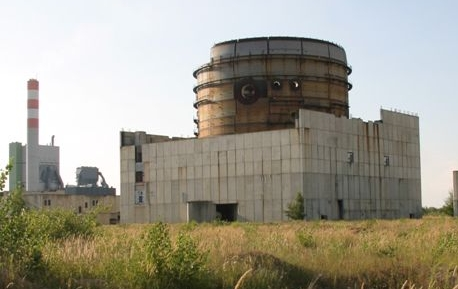
The ruins of the incomplete Stendal NPP reactor building

The Rheinsberg Nuclear Power Plant was the first (mostly experimental) nuclear power plant in East Germany. It was of low power and operated from 1966 until 1990. The second to be commissioned, the Greifswald Nuclear Power Plant, was planned to house eight of the Russian 440 MW VVER-440 reactors. The first four went online between 1973 and 1979. Greifswald 5 operated for less than a month before it was closed; the other three were cancelled during different stages of their build-up. In 1990, during the German reunification, all eastern German nuclear power plants were closed due to flaws in safety standards. The Stendal Nuclear Power Plant in East Germany was to be the largest nuclear power station in Germany. After German reunification and due to concerns about the Soviet design, construction was stopped, and the power station was never completed. In the 1990s, the three cooling towers that had been erected were demolished, and the area is an industrial estate today.

By 1992, a group of German and Swiss firms planned to proceed with the construction of the HTR-500, a design that made considerable use of the THTR-300 technology. But the politically hostile environment in the light of the Chernobyl disaster as well as technical issues with the THTR-300 halted any effort. The technology is now being pursued by the Chinese as the HTR-PM.

=== Construction ban and first phase-out schedule ===
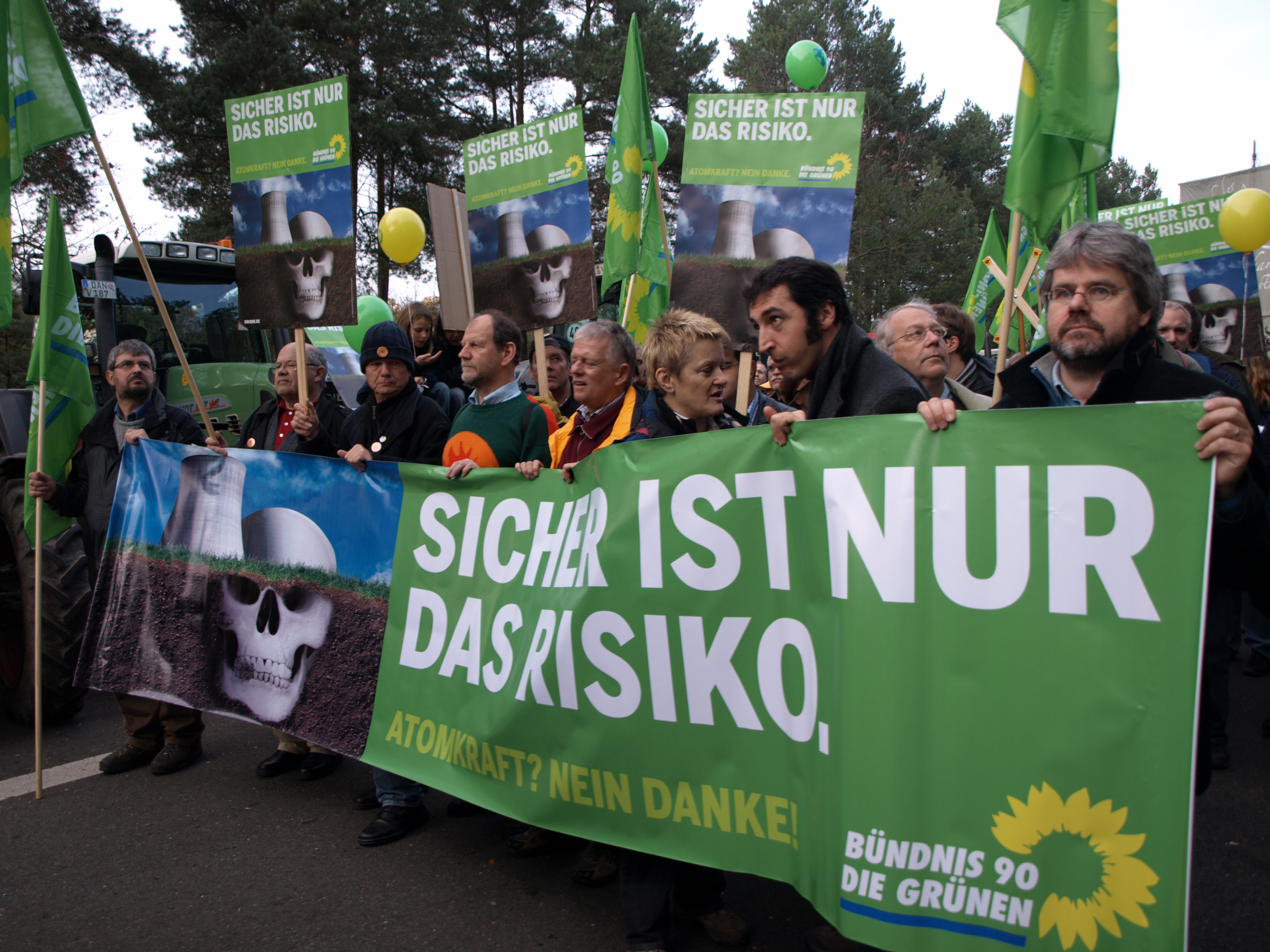
Anti-nuclear protest near nuclear waste disposal center at Gorleben in northern Germany on 8 November 2008. The banner reads "Only the risk is certain. Atomic power? No thanks!"

During the chancellorship of Gerhard Schröder, the social democratic-green government decreed Germany's final retreat from using nuclear power by 2022.

This involved a ban on the construction of new nuclear power plants. Additionally, all existing nuclear power plants were given a budget of energy generated before their shutdown would be mandated, resulting in an average projected lifespan per plant of 32 years.

This resulted in first shutdowns of the Stade Nuclear Power Plant in November 2003 and the Obrigheim plant in 2005. The last plant to be shut down was expected to be Neckarwestheim II in 2021.

=== Changes to phase-out schedule ===
The phase-out plan was initially delayed in late 2010, when during the chancellorship of centre-right Angela Merkel, the coalition conservative-liberal government decreed a 12-year delay of the schedule. This delay provoked protests, including a human chain of 50,000 from Stuttgart to the nearby nuclear plant in Neckarwestheim. Anti-nuclear demonstrations on 12 March attracted 100,000 people across Germany.

Eight of the seventeen operating reactors in Germany were permanently shut down following the March 2011 Fukushima nuclear disaster.

On 14 March 2011, in response to the renewed concern about the use of nuclear energy raised by the Fukushima incident in the German public and in light of upcoming elections in three German states, Merkel declared a 3-month moratorium on the reactor lifespan extension passed in 2010. German engineering-industry giant Siemens announced a complete withdrawal from the nuclear industry in 2011 as a response to the Fukushima nuclear disaster. On 15 March, the German government announced that it would temporarily shut down 8 of its 17 reactors, i.e., all reactors that went online before 1981. Former proponents of nuclear energy, such as Angela Merkel, Guido Westerwelle, and Stefan Mappus, changed their positions. In the largest anti-nuclear demonstration ever held in Germany, some 250,000 people protested on 26 March 2011, under the slogan "heed Fukushima – shut off all nuclear plants".

On 30 May 2011, the German government announced a plan to shut down all nuclear reactors by 2022. Prior to the decision, Germany's renewable energy sector already provided 17% of Germany's electricity and employed about 370,000 people. The decision to phase out nuclear power has been called the swiftest change in political course since unification.

Political writer David Frum characterised Merkel's decision as a political move to improve her approval ratings, which had sagged after the post-2008 financial crisis bailout of southern Europe by Germany.

In September 2011, Siemens, which had been responsible for constructing all 17 of Germany's existing nuclear power plants, announced that it would exit the nuclear sector following the Fukushima disaster and the subsequent changes to German energy policy and would no longer build nuclear power plants anywhere in the world.

Merkel stated that Germany "[does not] only want to renounce nuclear energy by 2022, we also want to reduce our CO_{2} emissions by 40 percent and double our share of renewable energies, from about 17 percent today to then 35 percent".

Before 2011, Germany was getting just under a quarter of its electricity from nuclear power. After the Fukushima disaster, the following eight German nuclear power reactors were declared permanently shut down on 6 August 2011: Biblis A and B, Brunsbuettel, Isar 1, Kruemmel, Neckarwestheim 1, Philippsburg 1, and Unterweser.

Global status of nuclear deployment (2022): Operating reactors, building new reactors Operating reactors, planning new build No reactors, building new reactors No reactors, new in planning Operating reactors, stable Operating reactors, decided on phase-out Civil nuclear power is illegal No reactors

On 5 December 2016, the Federal Constitutional Court (Bundesverfassungsgericht) ruled that the nuclear plant operators affected by the accelerated phase-out of nuclear power following the Fukushima disaster are eligible for "adequate" compensation. The court found that the nuclear exit was essentially constitutional but that the utilities are entitled to damages for the "good faith" investments they made in 2010. The utilities can now sue the German government under civil law. E.ON, RWE, and Vattenfall are expected to seek a total of €19 billion under separate suits. Six cases were registered with courts in Germany as of 7 December 2016.

As of March 2019, only seven nuclear plants had been left in operation and should be scheduled to be shut down and dismantled. As of early 2022, three plants remained for the final year.

=== Renewed debate ===
After Russia invaded Ukraine in 2022, German energy policy—which had up to that point relied on Russian imports (particularly natural gas) to a large degree—was re-evaluated, including a temporary suspension of the controversial Nord Stream 2 pipeline. The German minister of economy and climate, Robert Habeck, answered in an interview that he would be "open" to extending the life of the remaining three nuclear power plants but expressed skepticism as to the feasibility of and sense of such a move. Several newspapers called for a re-opening of the debate on the nuclear phaseout, including the Frankfurter Allgemeine Zeitung. The (former) operators of Germany's remaining three nuclear power plants as well as the three reactors that had been shut down in late 2021 (but not yet dismantled) commented that they are "open" to negotiations with the government as to extending the lifetime of those reactors or restarting those that were already shut down. On 21 August 2022, German Economy Minister Robert Habeck said that Germany would not reverse the phase-out itself but that he was open to the idea of extending the lifespan of the Isar Nuclear Power Plant in Bavaria, subject to a stress test of Germany's electricity system. German public opinion was split on the issue of phasing out nuclear power.

On 5 September 2022, the Federal Government announced that two of the three remaining nuclear power plants (Neckarwestheim and Isar 2) would operate beyond 31 December 2022 until April 2023 (cycle stretch out), while the Emsland Nuclear Power Plant was to be shut down as planned. However, on 10 October 2022, Scholz announced that all three would remain operating until 15 April 2023. Wolfgang Kubicki, deputy leader of the Free Democrats, said in an interview with the Funke Media Group that "Germany has the safest nuclear power plants worldwide and switching them off would be 'a dramatic mistake' with painful economic and ecological consequences." Other members of the Free Democratic Party have called for the nuclear power plants to be at least maintained as a precautionary measure in case they are needed in the future for power generation.

In April 2024, there was a controversy related to the decommissioning of nuclear power plants in Germany. German magazine Cicero claimed that German Economy Minister Robert Habeck had misled the public in 2022 and ignored the advice of experts who said nuclear facilities were still safe to operate. By early 2025 the journalists had used court orders to gain access to internal documents, which allowed them, in conjunction with the findings of an investigative committee, to reconstruct how the highest officials in Habeck's ministry, Patrick Graichen and Stefan Tidow, had suppressed experts who advocated keeping the nuclear power plants and only forwarded statements which argued against nuclear power.

== Reactors ==
Nuclear power plants in Germany (view)
Active plants
Closed plants
Unfinished plants

Plant name	Unit No.	Type	Model	Status	Capacity (MW)	Begin building	Commercial operation	Closed
AVR	1	HTGR	PBR Prototype	Shut down	13	1 Aug 1961	19 May 1969	31 Dec 1988
Biblis	1	PWR	Siemens-KWU	Shut down/in decommissioning	1167	1 Jan 1970	26 Feb 1975	6 Aug 2011
Biblis	2	PWR	KWU	Shut down/in decommissioning	1240	1 Feb 1972	31 Jan 1977	6 Aug 2011
Brokdorf	1	PWR	KWU	Shut down	1410	1 Jan 1976	22 Dec 1986	31 Dec 2021
Brunsbüttel	1	BWR	BWR-69	Shut down	771	15 Apr 1970	9 Feb 1977	6 Aug 2011
Emsland	1	PWR	Konvoi (KWU)	Shut down	1329	10 Aug 1982	20 Jun 1988	15 Apr 2023
Grafenrheinfeld	1	PWR	KWU	Shut down	1275	1 Jan 1975	17 Jun 1982	27 Jun 2015
Greifswald	1	PWR	VVER-440/V-230	Shut down/in decommissioning	408	1 Mar 1970	12 Jul 1974	14 Feb 1990
Greifswald	2	PWR	VVER-440/V-230	Shut down/in decommissioning	408	1 Mar 1970	16 Apr 1975	14 Feb 1990
Greifswald	3	PWR	VVER-440/V-230	Shut down/in decommissioning	408	1 Apr 1972	1 May 1978	28 Feb 1990
Greifswald	4	PWR	VVER-440/V-230	Shut down/in decommissioning	408	1 Apr 1972	1 Nov 1979	22 Jul 1990
Greifswald	5	PWR	VVER-440/V-213	Shut down/in decommissioning	408	1 Dec 1976	1 Nov 1989	24 Nov 1989
Greifswald	6	PWR	VVER-440/V-213	Finished; never entered service	408			
Grohnde	1	PWR	KWU	Shut down	1360	1 Jun 1976	1 Feb 1985	31 Dec 2021
Grosswelzheim	1	BWR	BWR	Dismantled	25	1 Jan 1965	2 Aug 1970	20 Apr 1971
Gundremmingen	A	BWR	GE, BWR-1	Shut down/in decommissioning	237	12 Dec 1962	12 Apr 1967	13 Jan 1977
Gundremmingen	B	BWR	BWR-72 (KWU)	Shut down	1284	20 Jul 1976	19 Jul 1984	31 Dec 2017
Gundremmingen	C	BWR	BWR-72 (KWU)	Shut down	1288	20 Jul 1976	18 Jan 1985	31 Dec 2021
Isar	1	BWR	BWR-69	Shut down/in decommissioning	878	1 May 1972	21 Mar 1979	6 Aug 2011
Isar	2	PWR	Konvoi (KWU)	Shut down	1410	15 Sep 1982	9 Apr 1988	15 Apr 2023
Kahl	1	BWR	BWR	Dismantled	15	1 Jul 1958	1 Feb 1962	25 Nov 1985
SNR-300	1	FBR		Finished; never entered service		1972		1985
KNK II	1	FBR		Shut down	17	1 Sep 1974	3 Mar 1979	23 Aug 1991
Krümmel	1	BWR	BWR-69 (KWU)	Shut down	1346	5 Apr 1974	28 Mar 1984	6 Aug 2011
Lingen	1	BWR	BWR	Shut down	183	1 Oct 1964	1 Oct 1968	5 Jan 1977
Mülheim-Kärlich	1	PWR	B & W	Shut down/in decommissioning	1219	15 Jan 1975	8 Aug 1987	9 Sep 1988
MZFR	1	PHWR	PHWR	Shut down	52	1 Dec 1961	19 Dec 1966	3 May 1984
Neckarwestheim	1	PWR	KWU	Shut down	785	1 Feb 1972	1 Dec 1976	6 Aug 2011
Neckarwestheim	2	PWR	Konvoi (KWU)	Shut down	1310	9 Nov 1982	15 Apr 1989	15 Apr 2023
Niederaichbach	1	HWGCR	Pressure tube reactor	Shut down/decommissioned	100	1 Jun 1966	1 Jan 1973	31 Jul 1974
Obrigheim	1	PWR	Siemens	Shut down/in decommissioning	340	15 Mar 1965	31 Mar 1969	11 May 2005
Philippsburg	1	BWR	BWR-69	Shut down	890	1 Oct 1970	26 Mar 1980	6 Aug 2011
Philippsburg	2	PWR	KWU	Shut down	1402	7 Jul 1977	18 Apr 1985	31 Dec 2019
Rheinsberg	1	PWR	VVER-70	Shut down/in decommissioning	62	1 Jan 1960	11 Oct 1966	1 Jun 1990
Stade	1	PWR	Siemens	Shut down/in decommissioning	640	1 Dec 1967	19 May 1972	4 Nov 2003
Stendal	1	PWR	VVER-1000/V-320	Unfinished		1983		1990
Stendal	2	PWR	VVER-1000/V-320	Unfinished		1983		1990
THTR-300	1	HTGR	PBR	Decommissioned	296	3 May 1971	1 Jun 1987	29 Sep 1988
Unterweser	1	PWR	KWU	Shut down/in decommissioning	1345	1 Jul 1972	6 Sep 1979	6 Aug 2011
Würgassen	1	BWR	BWR-69 (AEG)	Shut down/in decommissioning	640	26 Jan 1968	11 Nov 1975	26 Aug 1994

== Radioactive waste management ==
Nuclear power plants take years to dismantle, and contaminated sites have to be cleared and declared free of radiation. One estimate puts the cost of dismantling Germany's nuclear reactor sites at €18 billion, not counting the cost of radioactive waste disposal.

Spent nuclear fuel is stockpiled in temporary locations. In Germany, heavily contaminated spent fuel rods are stored in Castor containers on several temporary sites around the country.

Germany is preparing the former iron ore mine Schacht Konrad in Salzgitter as a national facility for the permanent disposal of low- to medium-grade radioactive waste materials.

=== Nuclear Waste Disposal Fund ===
On 19 October 2016, the German cabinet (Bundeskabinett) finalised a deal with nuclear power plant operators E.ON, EnBW, RWE, and Vattenfall over long-term nuclear waste disposal. Under the agreement, the four operators are freed of responsibility for storing radioactive waste; that responsibility is instead transferred to the state. In return, the operators will pay a total of €17.4 billion into a state-administered fund to finance the interim and final storage of nuclear waste. They will also pay an additional "risk surcharge" of €6.2 billion (35.5%) to cover the eventuality that costs exceed current projections and that the interest accrued by the fund is lower than expected. The operators will be responsible for decommissioning and deconstructing their own nuclear power plants, as well as preparing their radioactive waste for final storage.

Critics, including the German Renewable Energy Federation and BUND, claim the total of €23.6 billion would prove insufficient and that future taxpayers will carry the risk.

=== Transmutation ===
While the official policy of Germany is to dispose of spent fuel in a deep geological repository inside Germany's borders, Germany is also involved in research into the nuclear transmutation of high-level waste (primarily actinides, which account for most of the long-term radiotoxicity of spent nuclear fuel). An important research project underway in Belgium is MYRRHA, which relies on German suppliers for the particle accelerator, which is in a sense the "heart" of every accelerator-driven system and whose reliability is the key issue to be solved before such systems can be commercialised.

== Accidents ==
Nuclear power accidents in Germany
Date	Location	Description	Fatalities	Cost (million 2006 US$)	INES
24 November 1989	Greifswald, East Germany	A near-core meltdown at Greifswald Nuclear Power Plant: Three out of six cooling water pumps were switched off for a failed test. A fourth pump broke down due to a loss of electric power, and control of the reactor was lost. 10 fuel elements were slightly damaged before recovery.	0	?	3
4 May 1986	Hamm-Uentrop, West Germany	Operator actions to dislodge damaged fuel elements at the thorium high-temperature reactor released radioactivity to 4 km^{2} surrounding the facility.	0	267	?
17 December 1987	Hessen, West Germany	The stop valve failed for a moment at Biblis Nuclear Power Plant; contamination of the local area in the reactor building.	0	13	1-2

== Phase-out ==
Germany decided to phase out nuclear power in 2002. After multiple changes to its Atomgesetz (nuclear energy law) in 2010 and 2011, the phase-out was completed in 2023. The country has combined the phase-out with an initiative for renewable energy and wants to increase the efficiency of fossil power plants in an effort to reduce its reliance on coal. According to the former German Minister for the Environment, Jürgen Trittin, in 2020, this would cut carbon dioxide emissions by 40 percent compared with 1990 levels. Germany has become one of the leaders in the efforts to fulfil the Kyoto Protocol. Critics of the German policy have called it a mistake to abandon nuclear power, claiming the only alternative to nuclear power was coal, and abandoning nuclear power was therefore contradictory to the goal of lowering CO_{2} emissions.

The German nuclear industry has insisted that its shutdown would cause major damage to the country's industrial base. In 2012, member firms of the Verband der Industriellen Energie- und Kraftwirtschaft (VIK) reported power failures of several seconds duration, combined with a rise in frequency fluctuations. These were reportedly caused by network overloads due to the shutdown of nuclear power plants and an increase in wind power generation. VIK also fears that industrial control units will be damaged by outages.

The cost of replacing Germany's nuclear power generation with renewable energy has been officially estimated by the German Ministry of Economics at about €0.01/kWh (about €55 billion for the next decade), on top of the €13 billion per year already devoted to subsidizing renewables. However, unofficial estimates of the ministry and of the Rhenish-Westphalian Institute for Economic Research (RWI), the German Energy Agency (DENA), the Federation of German Consumer Organisations (VZBV), and the government-owned development bank (KfW) put the cost several times higher, at about €250 billion ($340 billion) over the next decade.

Some German manufacturers and energy companies have criticised the phase-out plans, warning that Germany could face blackouts. While this did not happen, there has been an increase in voltage fluctuations, which has damaged industrial facilities and caused them to install voltage regulators. A 2020 study found that lost nuclear electricity production has been replaced primarily by coal-fired production and net electricity imports. The social cost of this shift from nuclear to coal is approximately €3 to €8 billion annually, mostly from the eleven hundred additional deaths associated with exposure to the local air pollution emitted when burning fossil fuels. Swedish energy company Vattenfall went in front of the World Bank's International Centre for Settlement of Investment Disputes (ICSID) to seek compensation from the German government for the premature shut-down of its nuclear plants.

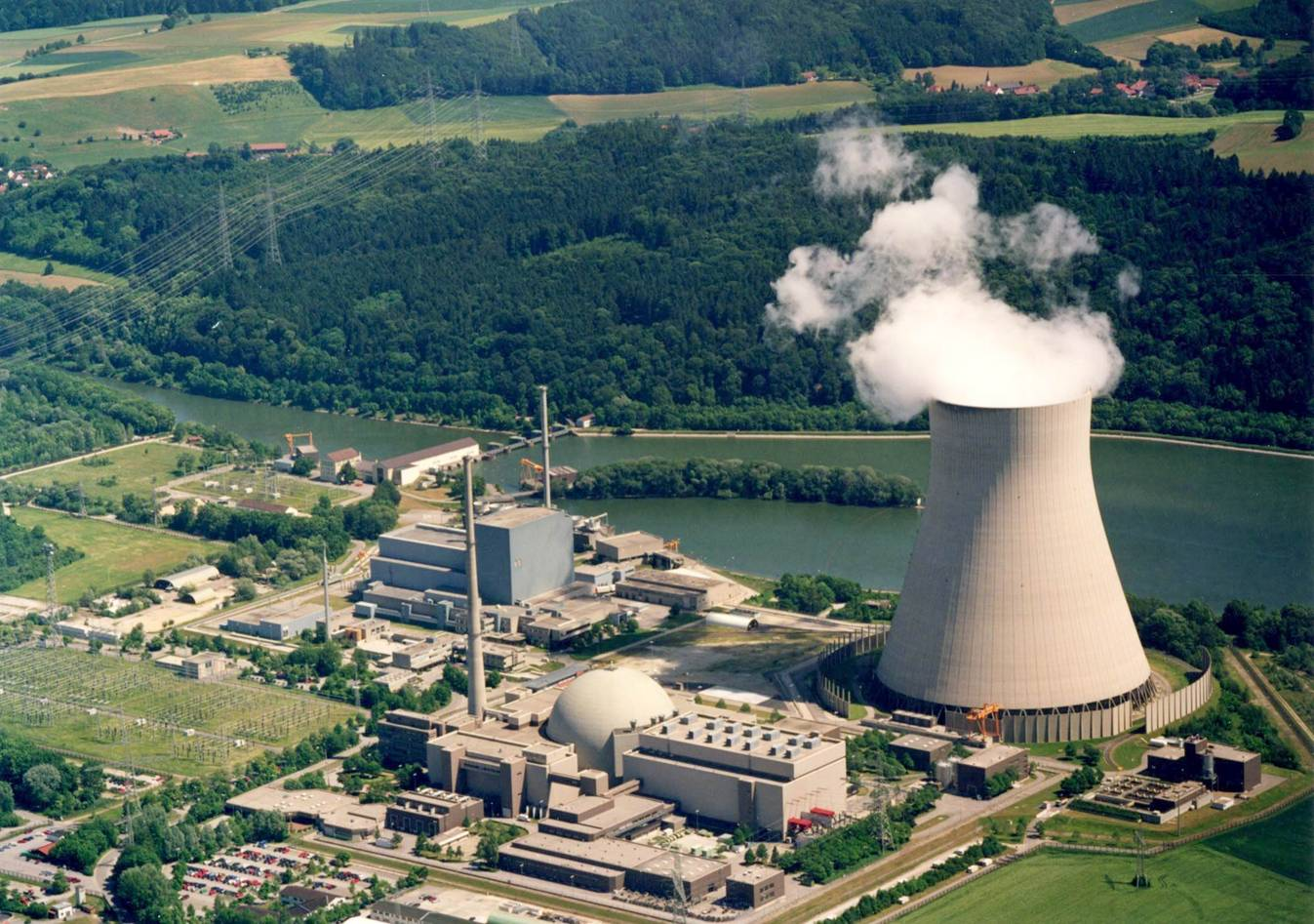
The Isar Nuclear Power Plant was taken out of service on 15 April 2023.

In March 2013, the administrative court for the German state of Hesse ruled that a three-month closure imposed by the government on RWE's Biblis A and B reactors as an immediate response to the Fukushima Daiichi accident was illegal. The state ministry of the environment acted illegally in March 2011, when an order was issued for the immediate closure of the Biblis units. RWE complied with the decree by shutting Biblis-A immediately; however, as the plants were in compliance with the relevant safety requirements, the German government had no legal grounds for shutting them. The court ruled that the closure notice was illegal because RWE had not been given sufficient opportunity to respond to the order.

In 2022, Vox commented that "Germany’s decision to restart old coal plants rather than extend the life of its nuclear power facilities reflects a failure of environmental priorities", and NPR wrote, "Facing an energy crisis, Germans stock up on candles." The last three nuclear power plants in Germany—Emsland, Isar II and Neckarwestheim II—were shut down on 15 April 2023. In April 2023, several critics of nuclear power plant shutdowns argued that the switching off of nuclear power plants deprives Germany of a source of low-emission power and forces the country to continue using fossil fuels that contribute to climate change.

== See also ==
- Energy policy of the European Union
- Energy in Germany
- Energiewende
- List of power stations in Germany
- Nuclear energy policy
- Nuclear power by country
