= Krümmel Nuclear Power Plant =

Nuclear power plant in Germany

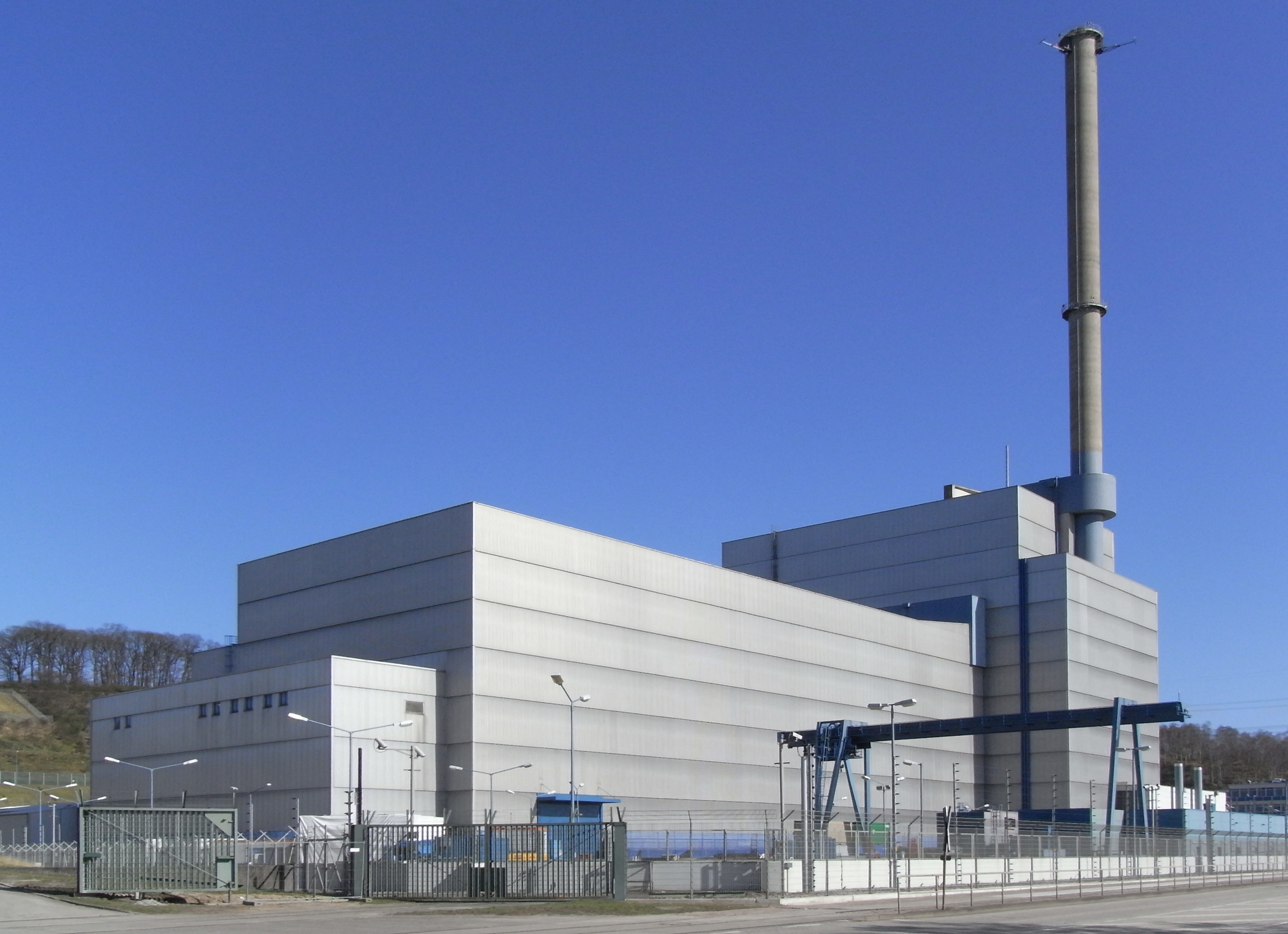
- Country: Germany
- Coordinates: 53°24′36″N 10°24′32″E
- Status: Mothballed (Earmarked not to return following moratorium on nuclear power)
- Construction began: 1974
- Commission date: September 28, 1983
- Decommission date: 6 August 2011
- Owners: 50% PreussenElektra; 50% Vattenfall
- Operator: Vattenfall

Nuclear power station
- Reactor type: BWR
- Reactor supplier: Siemens
- Cooling source: Elbe River

Power generation
- Units operational: 1 x 1,402
- Make and model: Siemens
- Nameplate capacity: 1,402 MW
- Capacity factor: 82.9%
- Annual net output: 10,178 GW·h

External links
- Website: kraftwerke.vattenfall.de/krummel
- Commons: Related media on Commons

Krümmel Nuclear Power Plant is a German nuclear power plant in Geesthacht, Schleswig-Holstein, near Hamburg. It was taken into operation in 1983 and is owned 50% by Vattenfall via Vattenfall Europe Nuclear Energy GmbH and 50% by E.ON, and operated by the Swedish Vattenfall. Its gross power production is 1,401 MW, using a Seimens/ABB manufactured boiling water reactor.

The reactor was the world's second largest of its type in commercial operation. It is nearly identical to three other German nuclear reactors, namely Brunsbüttel Nuclear Power Plant (near Hamburg), Philippsburg Nuclear Power Plant Block 1 and Isar Nuclear Power Plant Block 1, as well as the Austrian Zwentendorf Nuclear Power Plant, that never went into service. Krümmel was nearly twice as powerful as its sister stations, and the last of the BWR-69 series to be constructed.

Since July 4, 2009, after the reactor is not running, and since 2011 it is definitely shutdown due to popular demand. (Atomausstieg).

== Controversies and accidents ==
Since 1986, a significantly higher than average number of cases of leukemia have been found in the area around the power plant.

On June 28, 2007, a short circuit caused a fire in the transformer of the power plant and required the plant to be shut down. Power outages were experienced in the neighboring areas. The sequence of events caused the dismissal and resignation of several Vattenfall Europe AG employees.

On June 21, 2009, the Krümmel reactor was restarted for the first time since the 2007 fire, and the plant started to produce electricity again but was shut down for the second time on July 4, 2009, only a few days after its two-year-long repair period. The shutdown was caused by a short circuit in a transformer that was very similar to what caused the June 2007 fire. The reactor shut down normally and was not affected. The plant's general manager resigned. In a press conference July 9, Ernst Michael Züfle, head of the nuclear division of Vattenfall, acknowledged that there was damage to "perhaps a few fuel elements." Even before the shutdown, foreign bodies—sharp shards of metal from earlier work that should have been flushed—were found to have ended up, potentially dangerously, in the reactor and had, to some degree, been cleaned out. On July 7, Wulf Bernotat, CEO of E.on, wrote in a sharply worded letter to Vattenfall management in Sweden that his company was "appalled" by the handling of safety procedures at the plant, according to a lengthy report in Spiegel. The report went on to discuss how the accident could impact the German national debate about nuclear power plant license extensions. Before new transformers could be installed, it was decided in March 2011 to decommission the plant.
