= Emsland Nuclear Power Plant =

Nuclear power plant in Germany

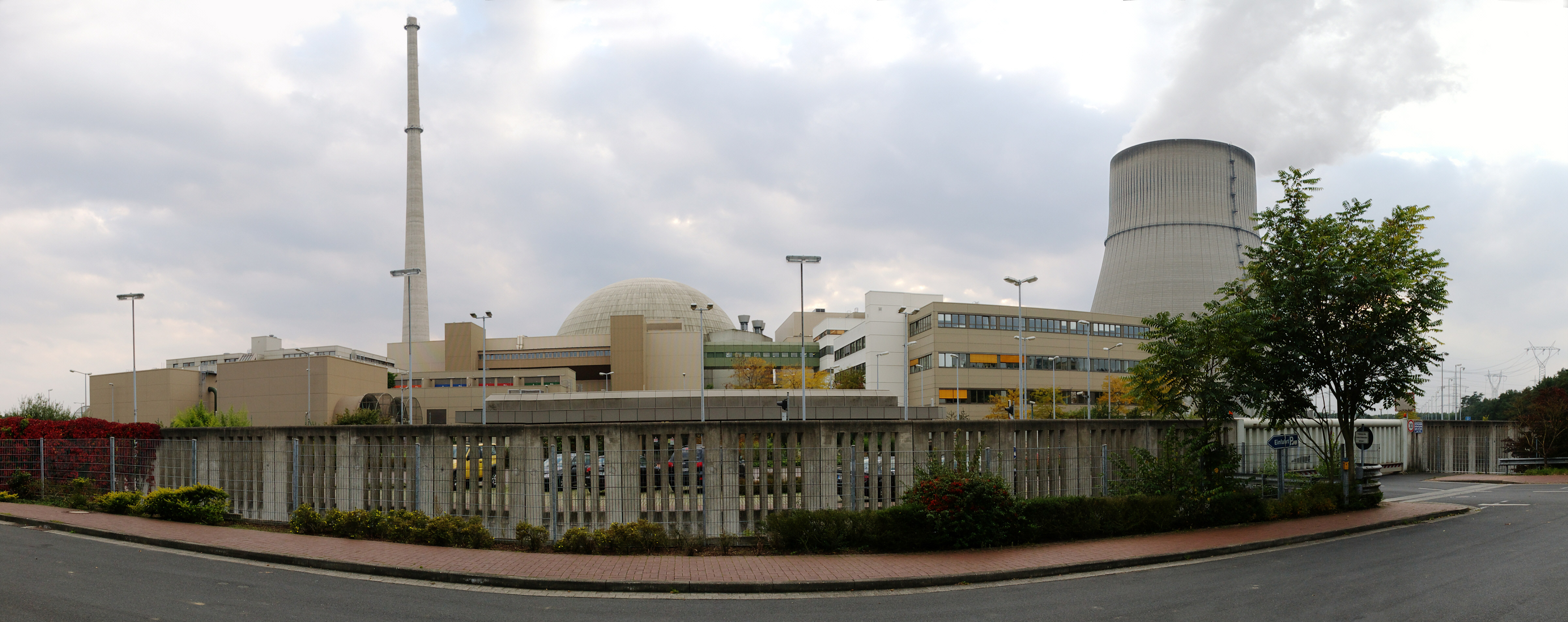
- Emsland Nuclear Power Plant
- Country: Germany
- Location: Emsland
- Coordinates: 52°28′27.23″N 07°19′04.29″E
- Status: Shut down
- Construction began: 10 August 1982
- Commission date: 20 June 1988
- Decommission date: 15 April 2023
- Owners: 87.5% RWE; 12.5% PreussenElektra
- Operator: KKW Lippe-Ems

Nuclear power station
- Reactor type: PWR
- Reactor supplier: Siemens
- Cooling towers: 1
- Cooling source: Ems River

Power generation
- Units operational: 1 x 1,363 MW
- Make and model: Siemens
- Nameplate capacity: 1,363 MW
- Capacity factor: 93.4%
- Annual net output: 11,148 GW·h

External links
- Website: in German
- Commons: Related media on Commons

Emsland Nuclear Power Plant was a nuclear power plant located in the district of Emsland in Lower Saxony, Germany just south of the Lingen Nuclear Power Plant. The plant’s single reactor had a nameplate capacity of 1,363 MW, and it was in operation from 1988 to 2023. It was owned by RWE Power AG.

== Basic information ==
The reactor had 193 fuel elements totaling a core weight of 103 tons. It is of the German Konvoi type, which was also used at Isar Nuclear Power Plant and Neckarwestheim Nuclear Power Plant.

The power plant has a 153-metre (502ft) tall natural-draft cooling tower.

While it was in operation, there were no events higher than 0 on the INES scale at the power plant.

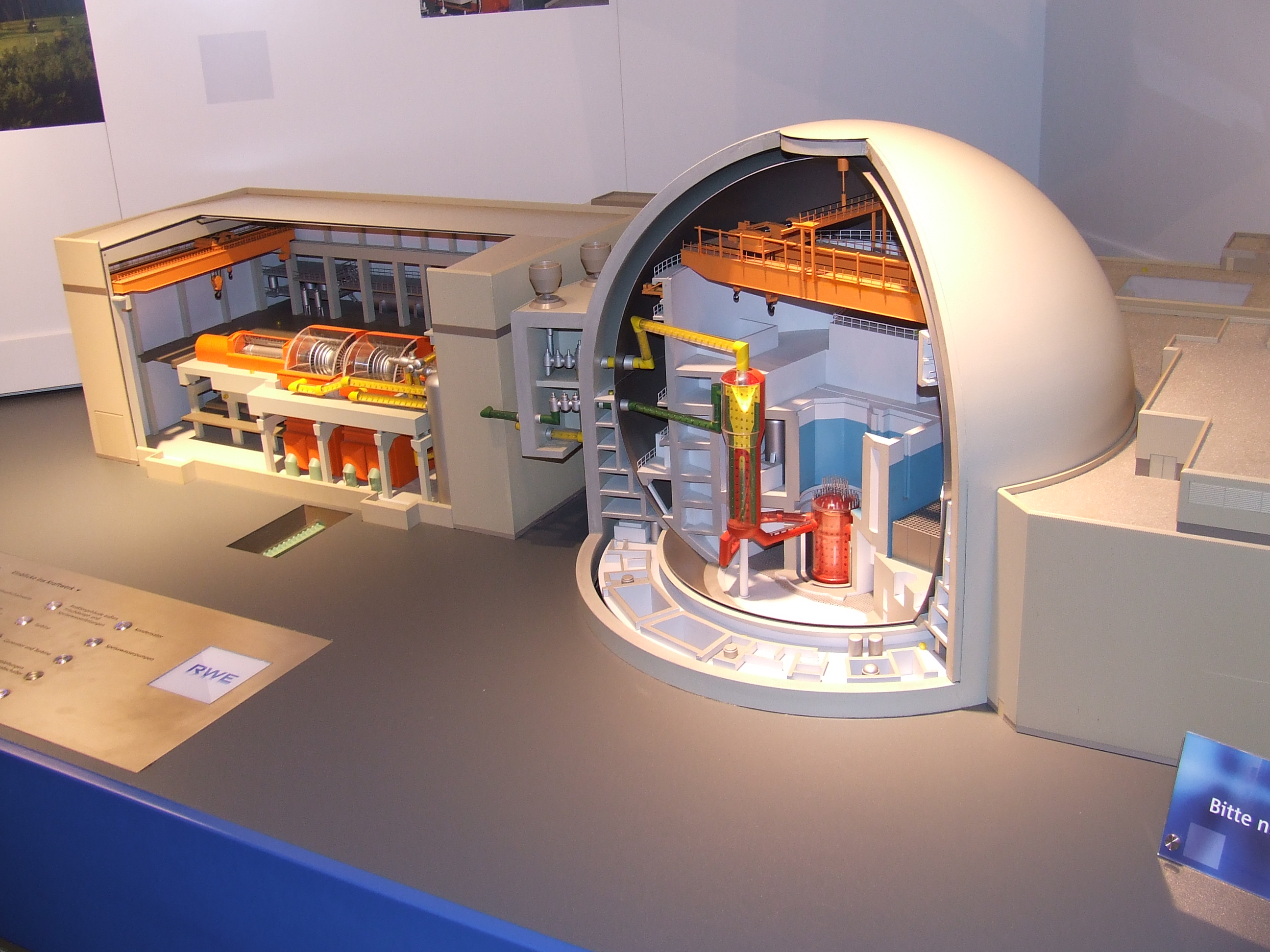
A model of the nuclear power plant

== History ==
Construction of the power plant began on 10 August 1982. The reactor first reached criticality on 14 April 1988, and began operation on 20 June 1988.

As part of the nuclear power phase-out, the nuclear power plant was taken out of service on April 15, 2023. It is currently undergoing decommissioning.
