= Konvoi =

Konvoi was a more or less standardized pressurized water reactor design from German Kraftwerk Union AG (KWU) (later, Siemens) with rating 1300–1400 MW. Internally, it referred as Baulinie 80 (Construction Line 80). It was developed from Pre-Konvoi reactor design. Konvoi installed at several nuclear power plants between 1981 and 1989 by KWU. It was designed to act as heating supply in addition of generating electricity. Konvoi was expected for easier and shorter approval procedures on power plant construction, however it failed due to the federal structure of German approval law as different state licensing authorities led to significant differences. In 1987, KWU integrated into Siemens. Siemens later developed Baulinie 95 (Construction Line 95) or Advanced Konvoi with nominal electrical output of up to 1500 MW in 1991. Since 1996, Siemens collaborated with Framatome in EPR hence EPR is considered as descendant of KWU/Siemens Konvoi and Framatome N4 and retrofitted Konvoi technologies into Pre-Konvoi reactors. In 2001, Siemens and Framatome decided to create joint stock Framatome ANP, which later integrated Siemens nuclear business was merged into Framatome.

List of operational, planned, and closed Konvoi installations
Power plant			Reactor		Capacity (MW)	Date			Status	Note	Ref
Unit	Country	Geolocation	Model	Gen	Capacity (MW)	Building	Operation	Closed	Status	Note	Ref
Isar II	Germany		KWU Konvoi		1482	15 Sep 1982	9 Apr 1988	15 Apr 2023	Permanent Shutdown		
Emsland	Germany		KWU Konvoi		1329	10 Aug 1982	20 Jun 1988	15 Apr 2023	Permanent Shutdown		
Neckarwestheim II	Germany		KWU Konvoi		1310	9 Nov 1982	15 Apr 1989	15 Apr 2023	Permanent Shutdown		
