= Pre-Konvoi =

German term for nuclear reactors

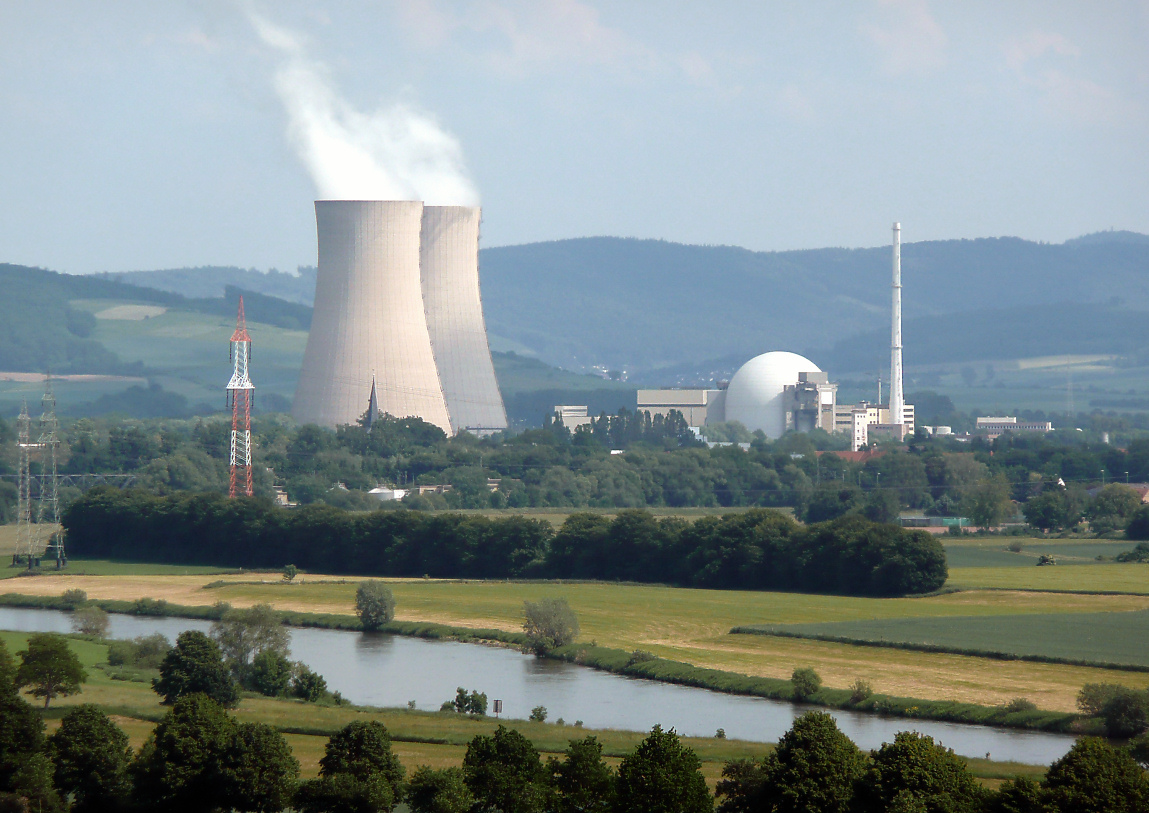
The Grohnde Nuclear Power Station operated a Pre-Konvoi reactor until it was decommissioned in 2021.

Several nuclear reactors in Germany and abroad are referred to as Pre-Konvoi (Vor-Konvoi). The term means that these units were produced and constructed before the manufacturer, Kraftwerk Union AG (KWU), switched over to a standardized design for this type of pressurized water reactor.

Pre-Konvoi plants include: Brokdorf, Grafenrheinfeld, Grohnde and Philippsburg unit 2. There is also one Pre-Konvoi plant abroad, the Angra Nuclear Power Plant in Brazil. This is also the location of the only Pre-Konvoi reactor being built; Unit 3 at the Angra Nuclear Power Plant has been in various stages in construction since 1984.

Most of these large 1300 MW reactors were built between 1982 and 1986 by Kraftwerk Union (KWU). Compared to the previous generation of reactors, the Pre-Konvoi plants have some safety improvements. Since the basic design dates back to the 1970s and basic plant parts cannot be retrofitted (e.g. reinforcement of the wall thickness of the reactor pressure vessel), they do not reach the safety level of the Konvoi plants, which represent a further development of the pre-Konvoi plants.

List of operational, planned, and closed Pre-Konvoi installations
Power plant			Reactor		Capacity (MW)	Status	Note	Ref
Unit	Country	Geolocation	Model	Gen	Capacity (MW)	Status	Note	Ref
Brokdorf	Germany		KWU Pre-Konvoi		1410	Decommissioned		
Grafenrheinfeld	Germany		KWU Pre-Konvoi		1275	Demolished		
Grohnde	Germany		KWU Pre-Konvoi		1360	Permanent Shutdown		
Philippsburg 2	Germany		KWU Pre-Konvoi		1402	Permanent Shutdown		
Angra 2	Brazil		KWU Pre-Konvoi		1275	Operational		
Angra 3	Brazil		KWU Pre-Konvoi		1245	Under Construction		
