= Biblis Nuclear Power Plant =

Closed nuclear power plant in Germany

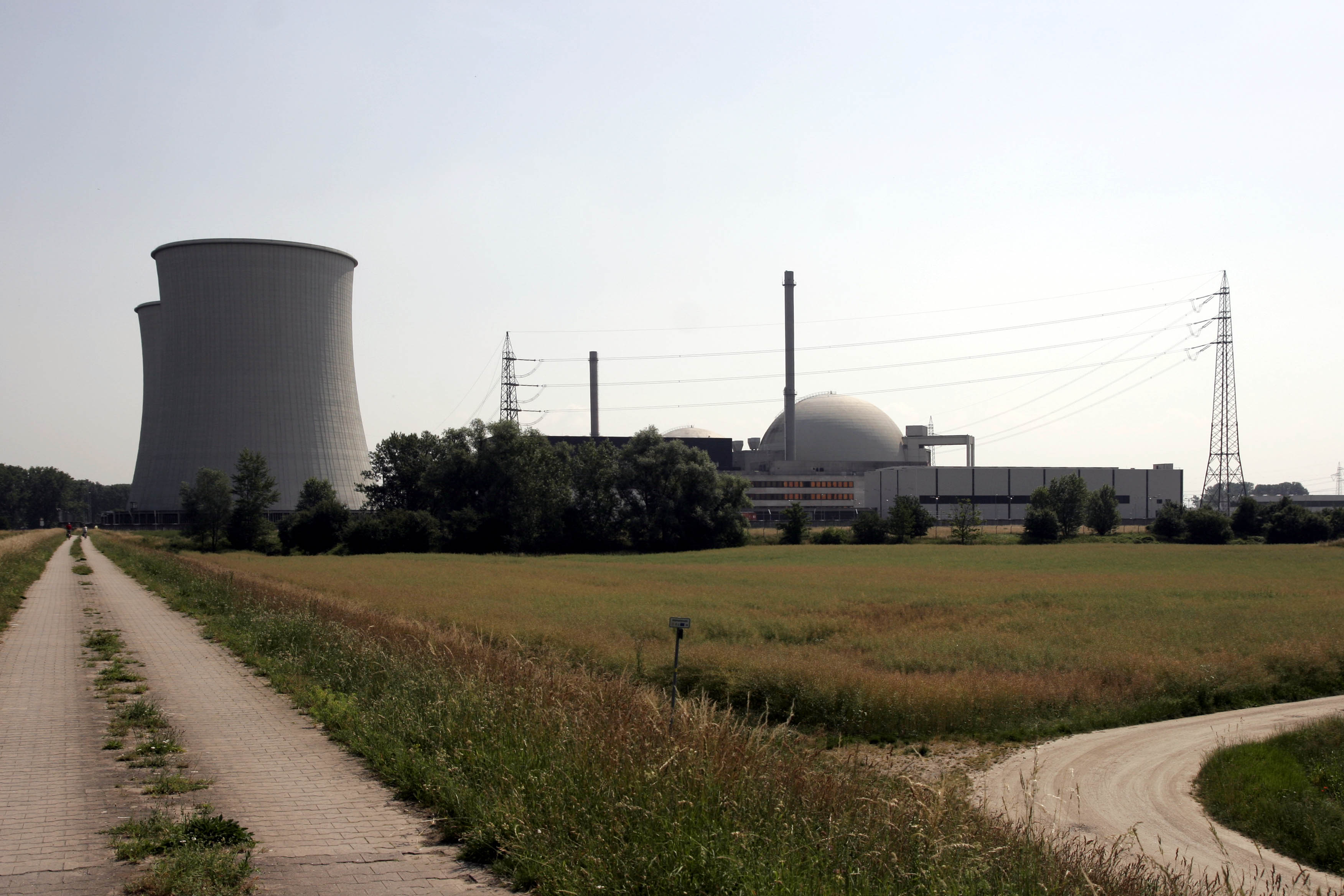
- Unit A, seen from South-West with two cooling towers
- Country: Germany
- Location: Biblis
- Coordinates: 49°42′36″N 8°24′55″E
- Status: Closed since 18 March 2011
- Construction began: 1969
- Commission date: 25 August 1974
- Decommission date: 2011
- Operator: RWE

Nuclear power station
- Reactor type: PWR
- Reactor supplier: Siemens
- Cooling towers: 4
- Cooling source: Rhine River

Power generation
- Make and model: Siemens
- Units decommissioned: 1 x 1,255 MW; 1 x 1,300 MW
- Nameplate capacity: 2,525 MW
- Capacity factor: 69.2%
- Annual net output: 15,306 GW·h

External links
- Website: Site c/o RWE
- Commons: Related media on Commons
- Location within Germany

The Biblis Nuclear Power Plant is a nuclear power plant in the German municipality of Biblis that consists of two units: unit A with a gross output of 1200 megawatts and unit B with a gross output of 1300 megawatts. Both units are pressurized water reactors. The operator of this power plant is the German RWE Power AG, an electrical utility based in Essen. Unit A began operation on 16 July 1974, and entered commercial service on 25 August 1974; unit B reached criticality on 25 March 1976. Both units now are shut down indefinitely for political reasons (Atomausstieg).

Biblis is the partner power station of the Balakovo Nuclear Power Plant.

== Closure ==
In March 2013, Angela Merkel ordered the three-month closure of the Biblis Nuclear Power Plant as an immediate response to the Fukushima accident. RWE complied with the decree by shutting Biblis-A immediately. The administrative court for the German state of Hesse ruled that this order was illegal. The court ruled that RWE had not been given sufficient opportunity to respond to the order. Nevertheless, the units are now indefinitely shut down, due to the government's later decision to phase out all nuclear power (Atomausstieg).

== Incidents ==
On 17 December 1987, an incident (INES 1) occurred: Operators overlooked a stop valve that had not been closed. In order to close the armature a valve was opened. The radioactive primary cooling water discharged for a short time into the annular space. Because the discharge of the reactor cooling water took place outside of the reactor containment, there was potentially no feedback from the sump over the safety cooling pumps. The incident became public one year later, when an article in an American technical periodical (Nucleonic Weeks) was published.IAEA

There have been no other events higher than 0 on the INES scale.

== See also ==
- Anti-nuclear movement in Germany
- Nuclear power in Germany
- Vulnerability of nuclear plants to attack

== Images ==
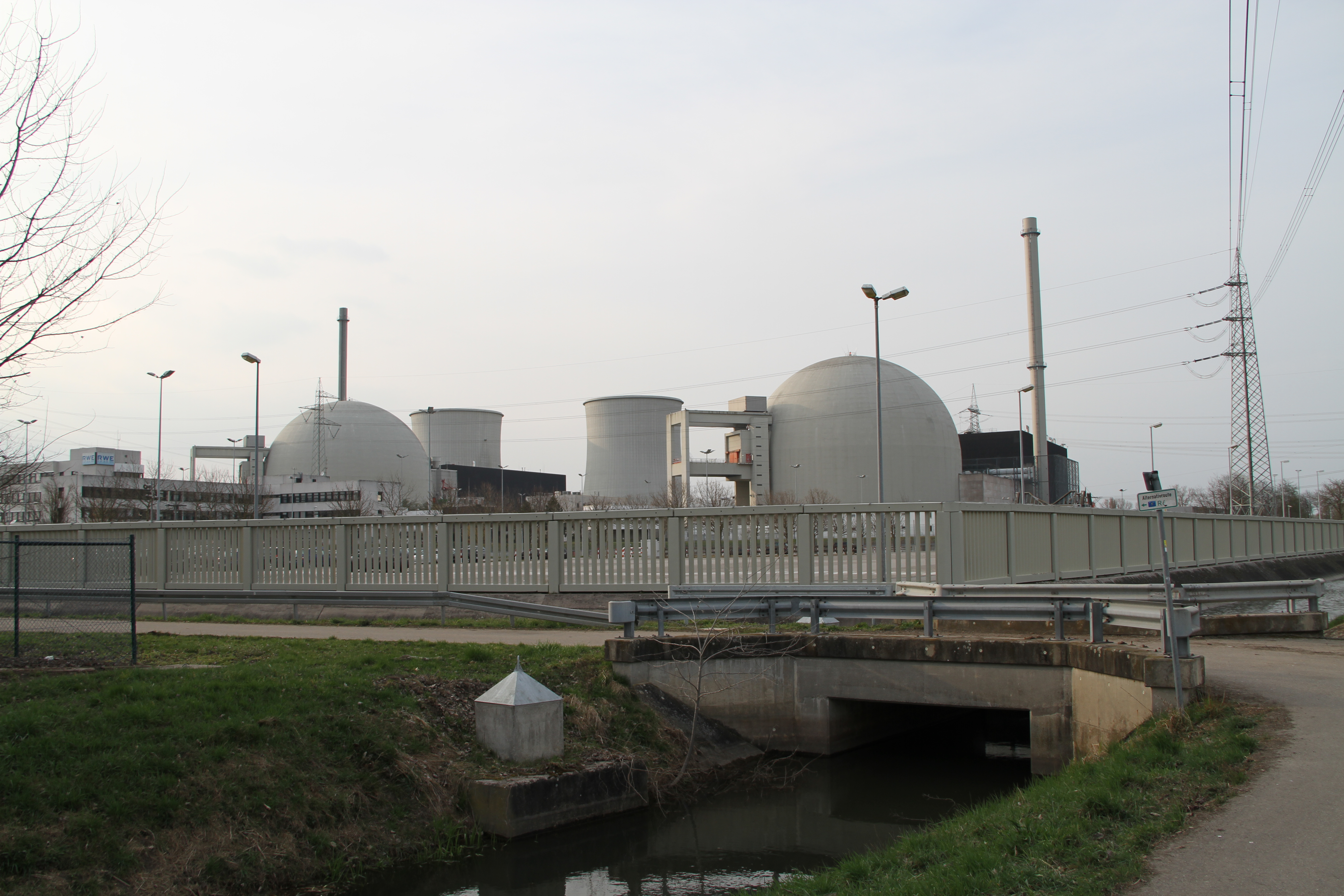
Biblis Nuclear Power Plant (Germany), block A (right) - block B (left)

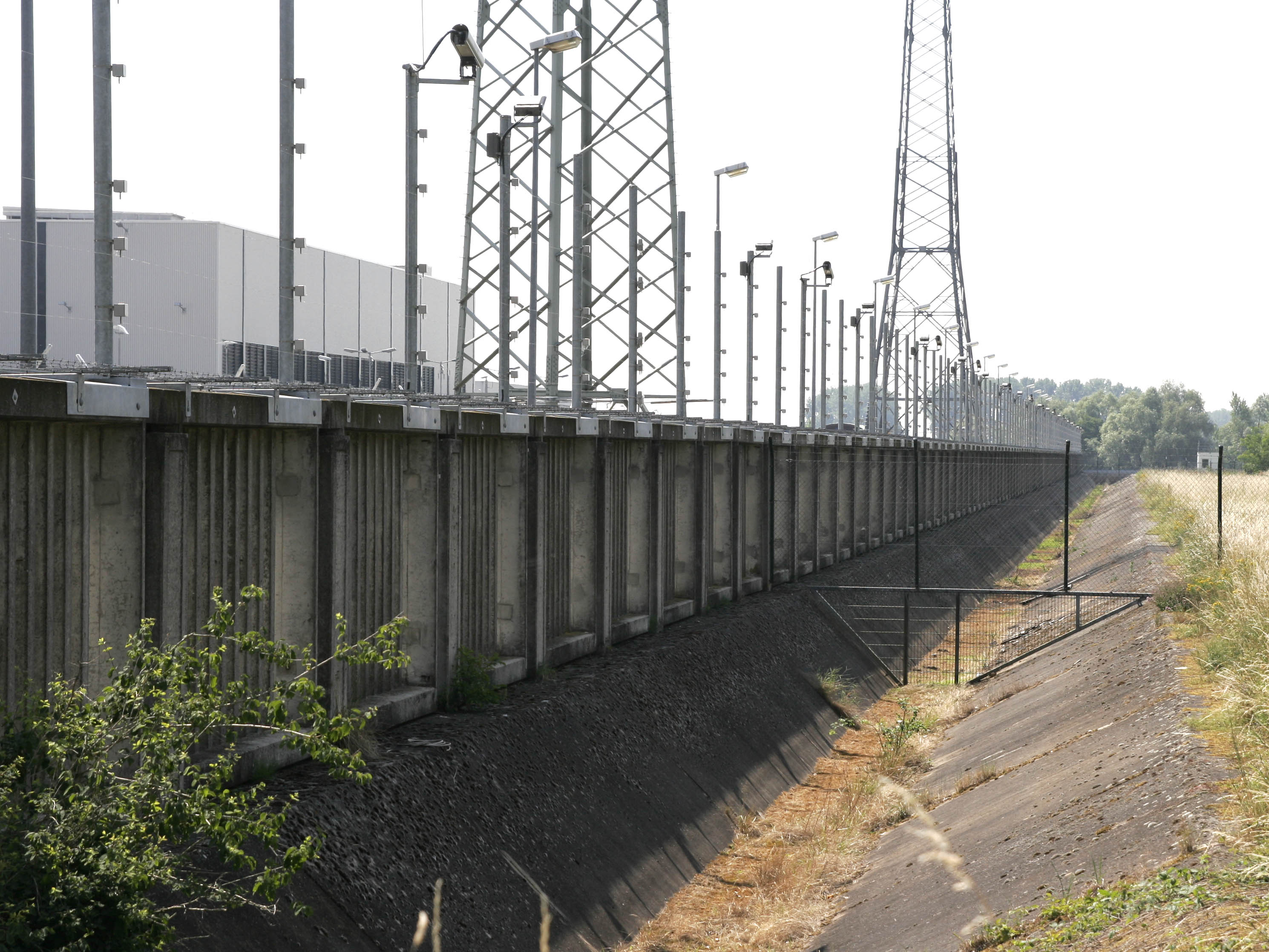
Security measures on South site

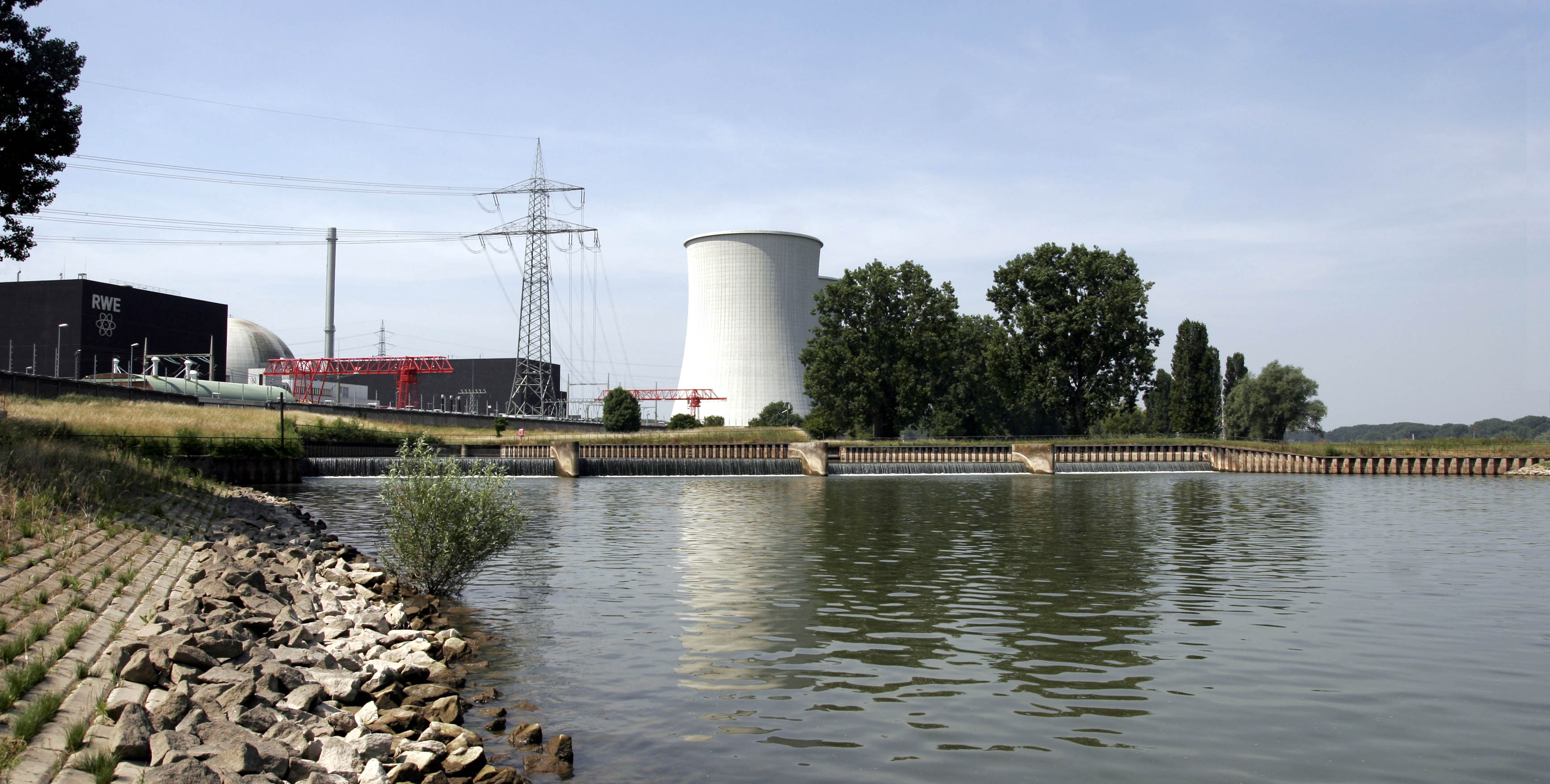
Ref-flow from cooling towers into the Rhine river (unit A in the background)

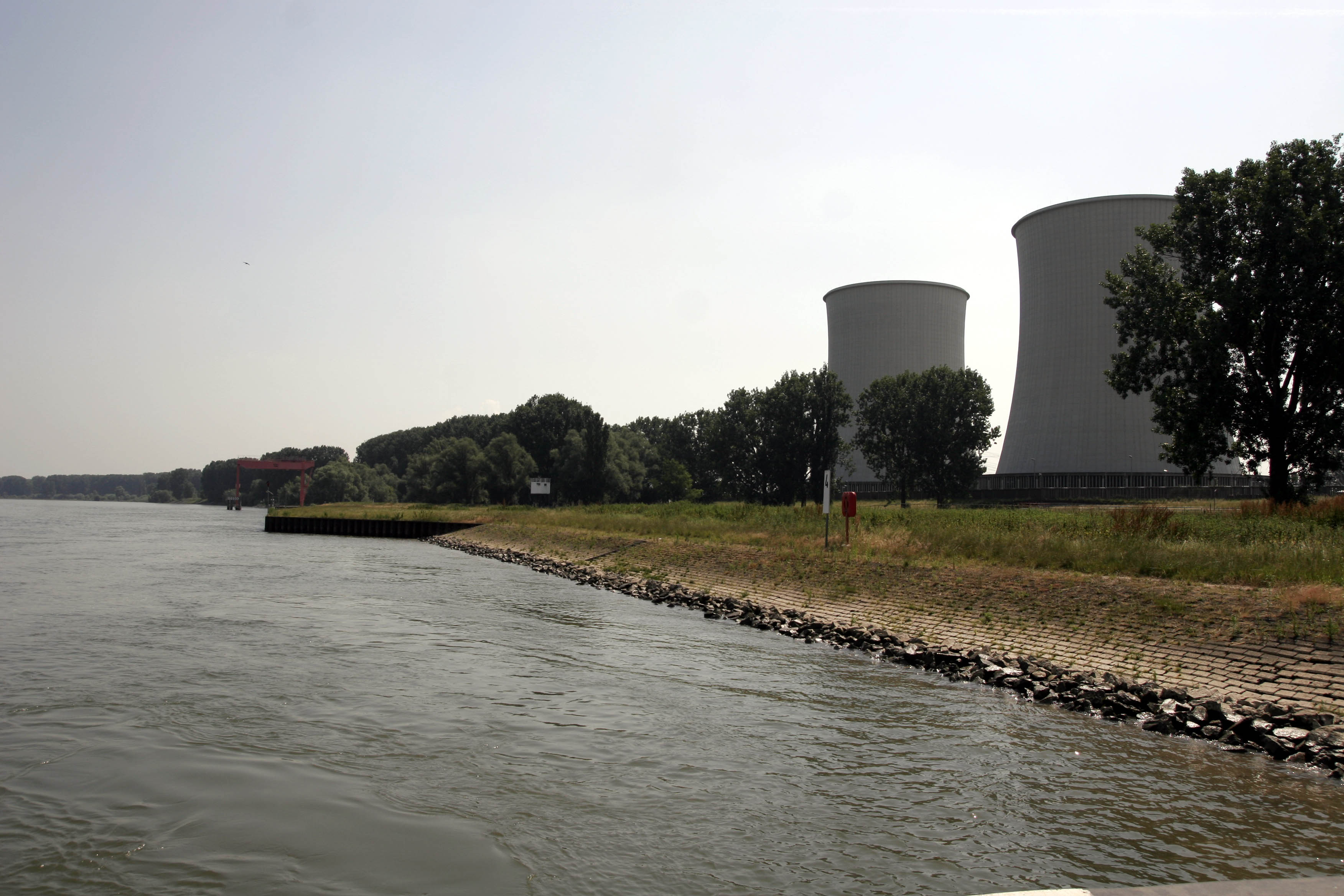
Biblis Nuclear Power Plant is on the Rhine river. On the right side two cooling towers from unit A. In the background a ship landing place where heavy components such as reactor vessels and steam generators were landed by ship.
