= Angra Nuclear Power Plant =

Nuclear power plant in Brazil

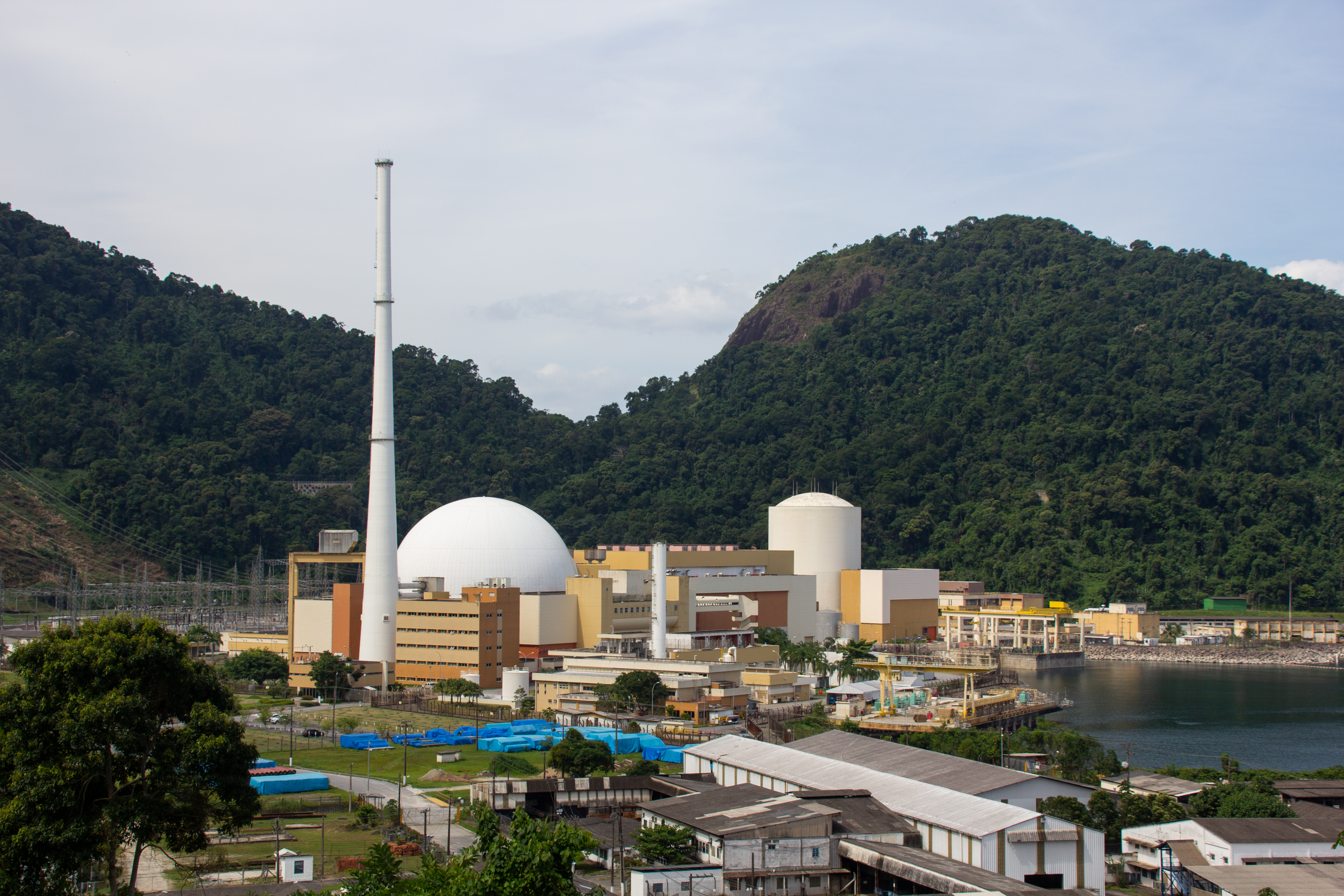
- Angra Nuclear Power Plant
- Country: Brazil
- Coordinates: 23°00′30″S 44°27′26″W
- Status: Operational
- Construction began: 1971
- Commission date: 1 January 1985
- Operator: Eletrobrás Termonuclear S.A. - Eletronuclear
- Cooling source: South Atlantic Ocean
- Thermal capacity: 1 × 1882 MW_{th} 1 × 3764 MW_{th}

Power generation
- Units operational: 1 × 640 MW (gross); 1 × 1350 MW (gross)
- Units under const.: 1 × 1405 MW (gross)
- Nameplate capacity: 1884 MW
- Capacity factor: 88.4% (2014-2018)
- Annual net output: 14,593 GW·h

External links
- Website: eletronuclear.gov.br
- Commons: Related media on Commons

Angra Nuclear Power Plant is Brazil's only nuclear power plant. It is located at the Central Nuclear Almirante Álvaro Alberto (CNAAA) on the Itaorna Beach in Angra dos Reis, Rio de Janeiro. It consists of two pressurized water reactors (PWR), Angra I, with a net output of 609 MWe, first connected to the power grid in 1985 and Angra II, with a net output of 1,275 MWe, connected in 2000.

Work on a third reactor, Angra III, with a projected output of 1,245 MWe, began in 1984 but was halted in 1986. Work started again on 1 June 2010 for entry into service in 2015 and later delayed into the 2020s. Construction resumed in November 2022.

== Existing complex ==
The Central Nuclear Almirante Álvaro Alberto complex is administered by Eletronuclear, a state company with the monopoly in nuclear power generation in Brazil. The complex employs some 3,000 people and generates another 10,000 indirect jobs in Rio de Janeiro state.

Angra I was purchased from Westinghouse of the USA (its sister power plant is Krško Nuclear Power Plant in Slovenia). The balance of plant design was subcontracted to Gibbs and Hill (USA) in association with PROMON Engenharia S.A. and construction to Brasileira de Engenharia S.A.

The purchase did not include the transfer of sensitive reactor technology. As a result, Angra II was built with pre-Konvoi German technology, as part of a comprehensive nuclear agreement between Brazil and West Germany signed by President Ernesto Geisel in 1975. The complex was designed to have three PWR units with a total output of around 3,000 MWe and was to be the first of 4 nuclear plants that would be built up to 1990.

== Reactors ==
The plant has two operating pressurized water reactors, with a total net capacity of 1,854 MW_{e}. Its units are rated as follows:

Unit	Type	Start construction	First criticality	Commercial operation	Electric Power (net)	Comments
Angra – 1	Westinghouse 2-loop PWR	1 May, 1971	3 March, 1982	1 January, 1985	609 MW_{e}	In operation
Angra – 2	Siemens Pre-Konvoi PWR	1 January, 1976	14 July, 2000	1 February, 2001	1245 MW_{e}	In operation
Angra – 3	Siemens Pre-Konvoi PWR	1 June, 2010	–	–	1405 MW_{e}	Under construction

== Future developments ==
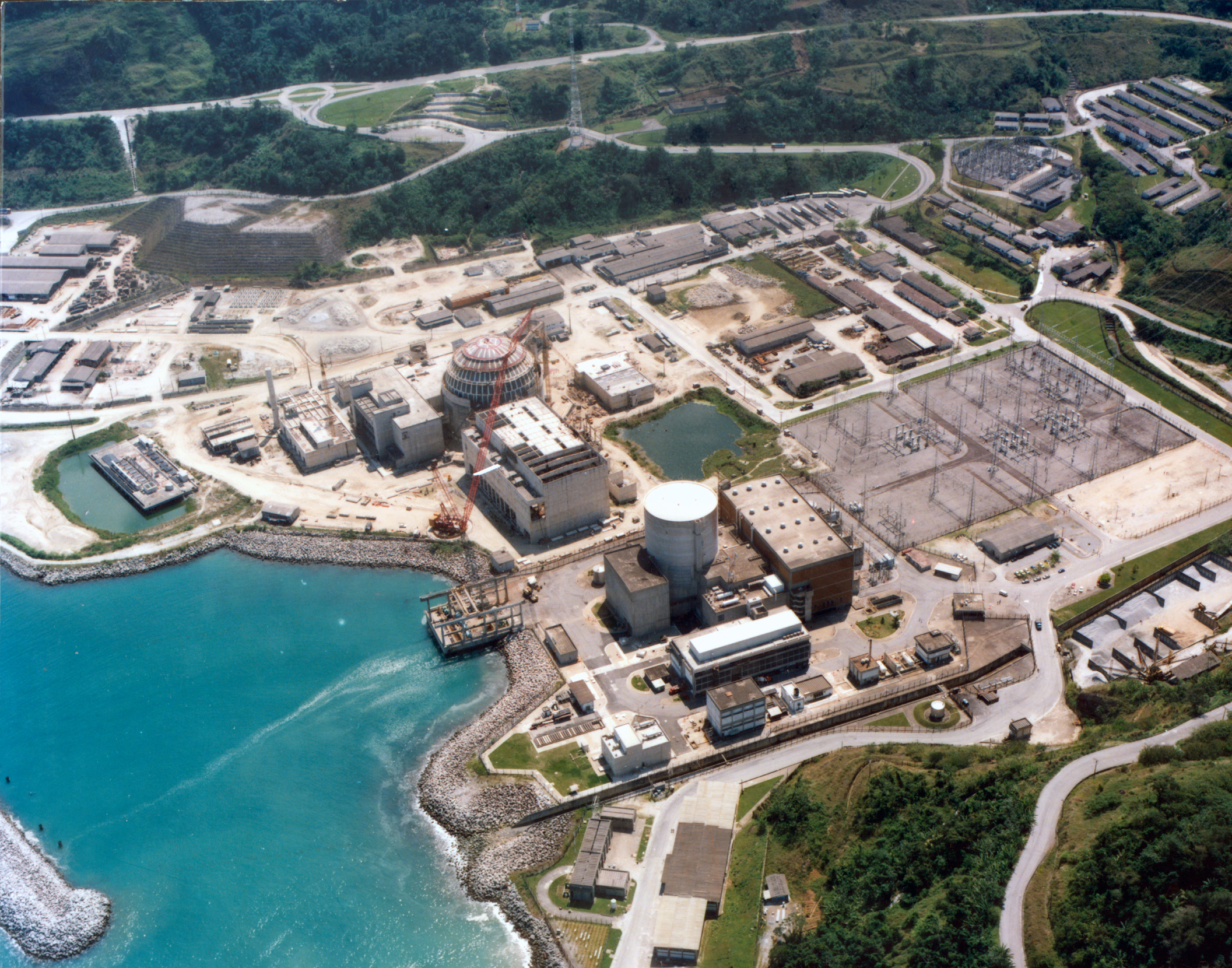
Construction site Angra II in 1990s

The development of Angra III began in 1984 as a Siemens/KWU pressurized water reactor but was halted in 1986. About 70% of the plant's equipment was purchased in 1985 but has been in storage ever since. In June 2007, restarting of work on was approved by the National Council for Energy Policy but was halted again. On 31 May 2010, the National Nuclear Energy Commission granted a licensee for construction of the third reactor. Construction of the reactor, which has a capacity of 1,350 MWe, begun on 1 June 2010 and was predicted to be operational by 2018.

After stopping construction in 2014, the Brazilian government have decided to auction off the incomplete power station to private investors in 2018. Based on that timetable and the volume of construction works to complete, the Energy deputy minister expected completion to be achieved by 2023.

In November 2021, the Brazilian government rescheduled the conclusion of Angra III for 2026–27, and announced the construction of a fourth nuclear power plant, to be inaugurated in 2031. In February 2022, the consortium that will complete the reactor agreed a contract, which is planned to enable reactor operations to start in 2026.

== See also ==
- List of power stations in Brazil
- List of nuclear power stations
- Nuclear activities in Brazil
