= Neckarwestheim Nuclear Power Plant =

Nuclear power plant in Neckarwestheim, Germany

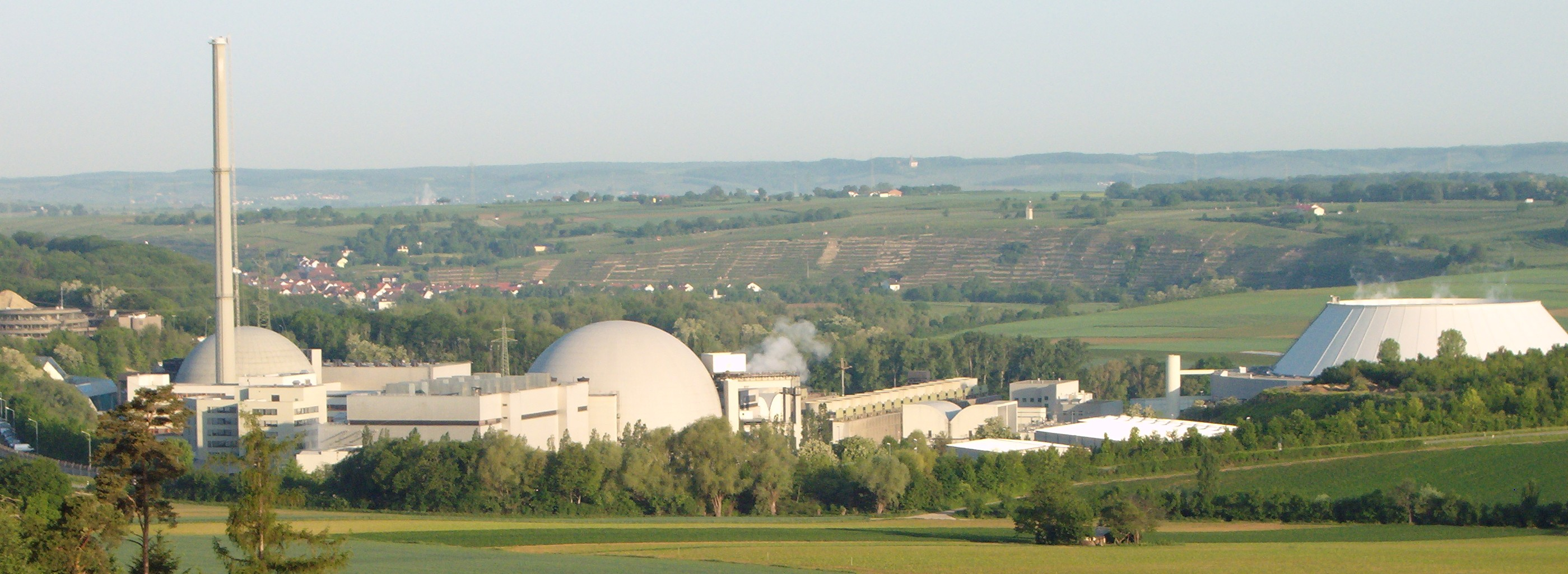
- Neckarwestheim Nuclear Power Plant: Unit I and the chimney (left), Unit II (middle), Cell Cooling Tower and Hybrid Cooling Tower (right)
- Country: Germany
- Location: Neckarwestheim
- Coordinates: 49°02′30″N 9°10′30″E
- Status: Decommissioned
- Construction began: 1971
- Commission date: 26 May 1976
- Decommission date: 15 April 2023
- Owner: EnBW
- Operator: EnBW

Nuclear power station
- Reactors: GKN I, GKN II
- Reactor type: PWR
- Reactor supplier: KWU/Siemens
- Site elevation: 172,5m
- Cooling towers: 1
- Cooling source: Neckar River

Power generation
- Units decommissioned: 1 × 840 MW (GKN I), 1 × 1,400 MW (GKN II)
- Nameplate capacity: 2240 MW
- Capacity factor: 87.1%
- Annual net output: 17,060 GW·h

External links
- Website: www.enbw.com/unternehmen/konzern/energieerzeugung/kernenergie/standorte/
- Commons: Related media on Commons

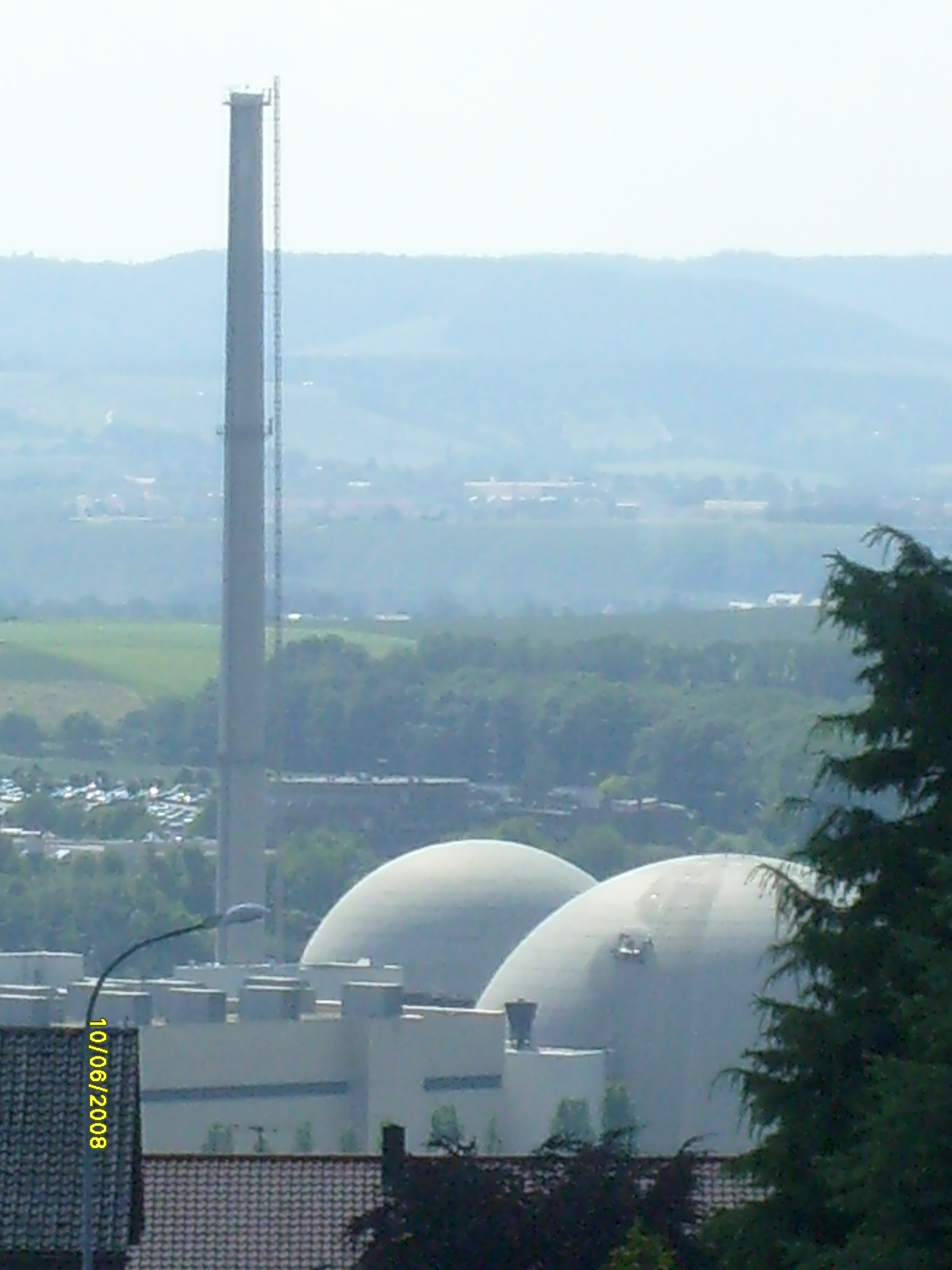
The containment buildings of the two Neckarwestheim units

Neckarwestheim Nuclear Power Station was a nuclear power plant in Neckarwestheim, Germany, sometimes abbreviated GKN (for German: Gemeinschaftskraftwerk Neckar), operated by EnBW Kernkraft GmbH, a subsidiary of EnBW. It featured two pressurized water reactors, GKN I and GKN II, with a combined nameplate capacity of 2240 MW.

As part of the country's nuclear power phase-out, the last active reactor GKN II was taken out of service on 15 April 2023.

== GKN I ==
Unit I, in operation from 1976 to 2011, carried a nominal electrical power of 840 megawatts. The 50 Hz three phase AC power was 567 megawatts and for the 16.7 Hz traction current power 174 MW. The traction current generator was the world's largest single-phase AC generator. The generator block 1 was rated 21,000 volts at a current of 27,000 amperes, and the traction current generator was rated 14,500 volts and a current of 12,000 amperes. The current produced by the generators was stepped up to 220 kilovolts (three-phase alternating current) or 110 kilovolts (single-phase traction current) with the unit transformers. Unit I was the only nuclear power station which produced traction current.

Unit I was shut down on 17 March 2011, ten days before the 2011 Baden-Württemberg state election, for a three-month moratorium on nuclear power. An announcement on 30 May 2011 named block I as a unit that would not be returning to service for political reasons.

== GKN II ==
Unit 2, in operation from 1988 to 2023, had a nominal electrical power of 1400 megawatts. The generator produced 50 Hz three-phase alternating current with a voltage of 27,000 V and a current of 35,000 amperes. Unlike Unit 1, no dedicated traction current generation took place, but some of the power produced was converted at the traction current substation. This is transmitted through the 380 kV generator transformer block of the II and the 380 kV-machine transformer of the motor-generator sets.

On 15 April 2023, exactly 34 years after the start of commercial operation and following a four-month extension of its operating life, the unit was permanently shut down. GKN II was disconnected from the grid at 11:59 p.m., after the Emsland and Isar 2 nuclear power plants had already been taken offline earlier that evening. GKN II was the last nuclear power reactor in Germany to be shut down as part of the nuclear phase-out.

=== Dimensions ===
The outer concrete building of the double-containment has a height of around 54,5 m and a diameter of around 67 m.

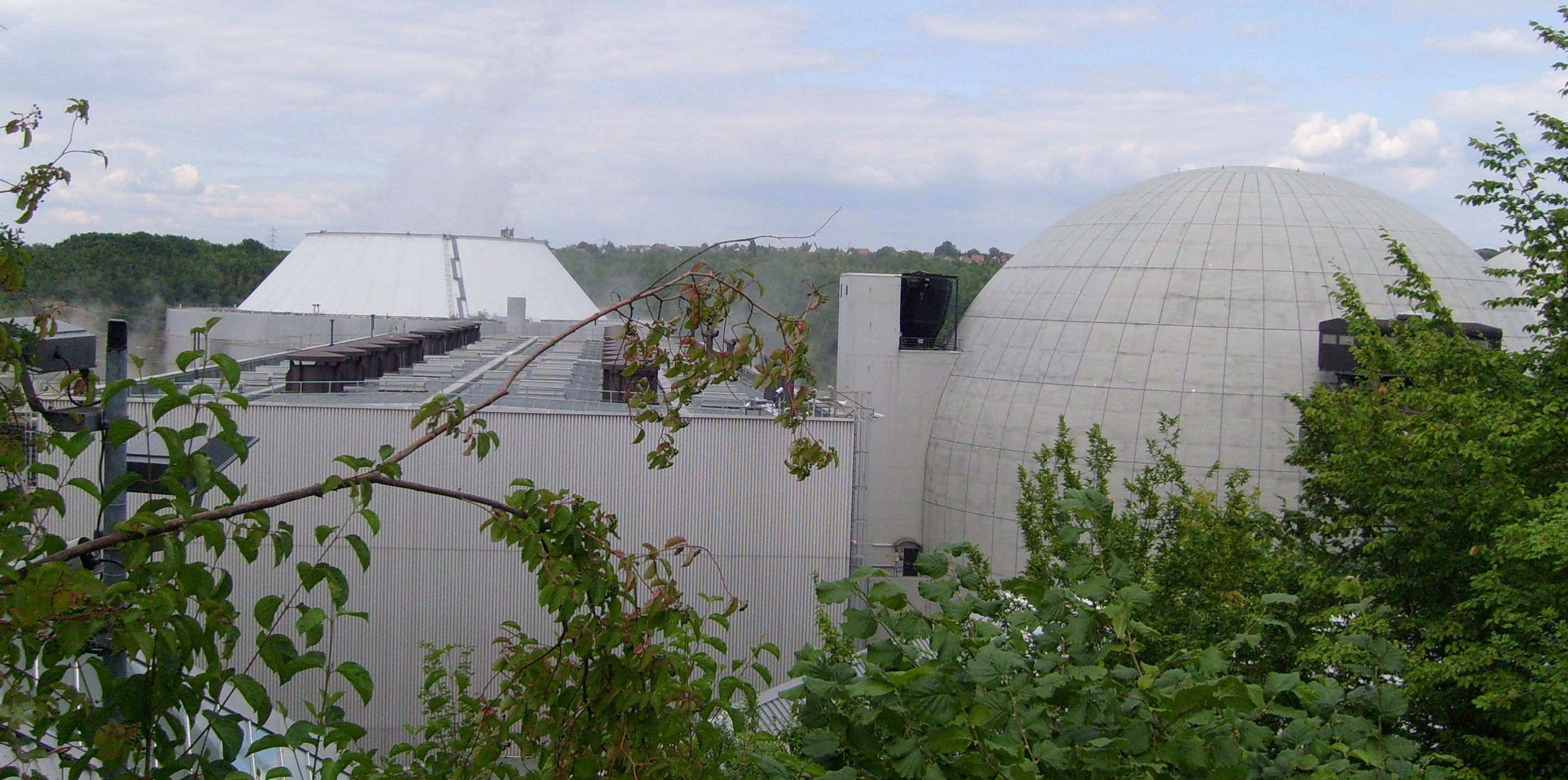
Unit 1 of the Neckarwestheim Nuclear Power Plant (right) and the cooling tower of Unit 2 (left)

== Traction current converter plant ==
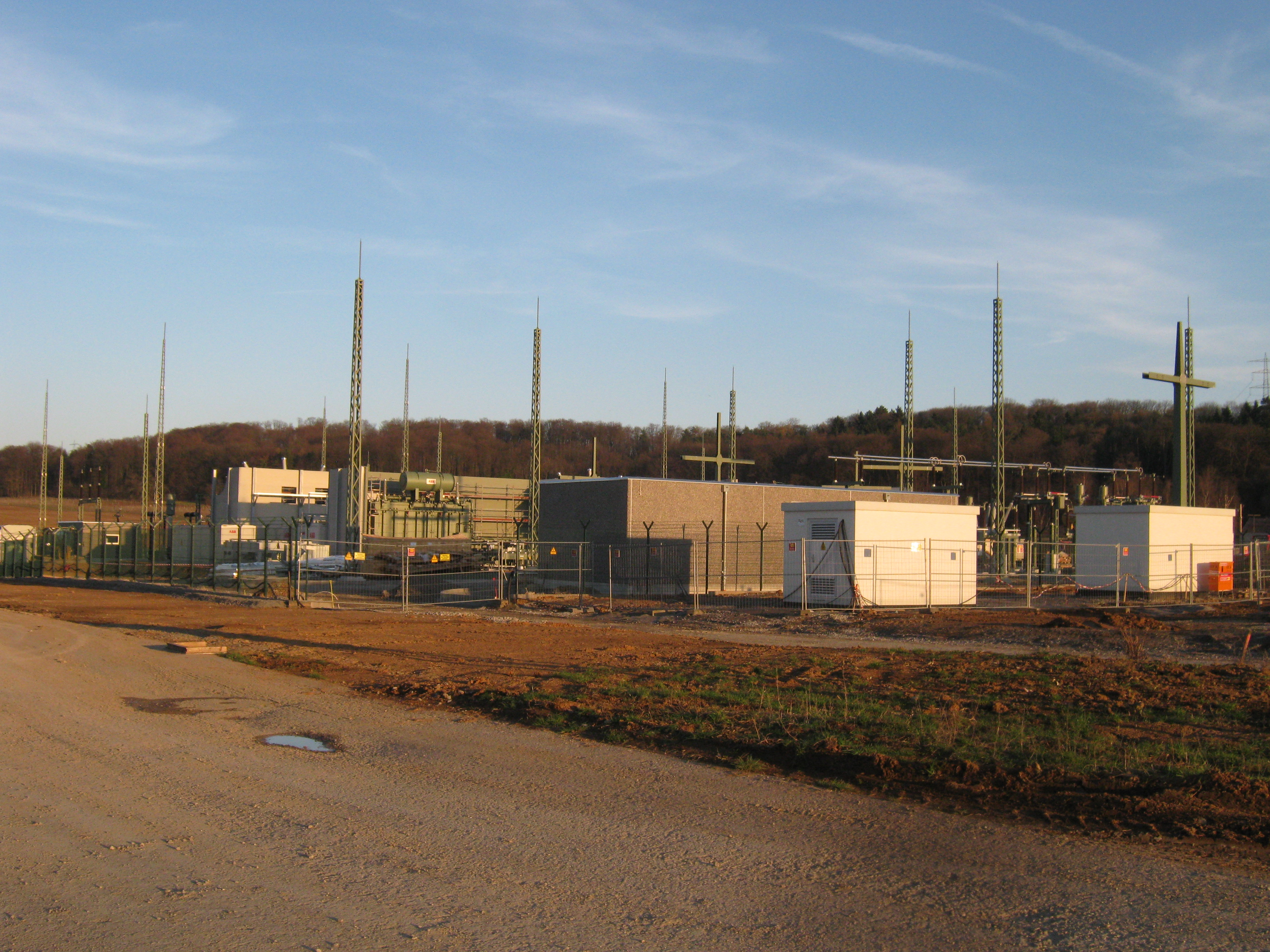
Traction Current Inverter under construction

The GKN station has a 16.7 Hz traction current converter plant. It is close to the switchgear of block II, has two identical sets, consisting of a three-phase 50 Hz AC motor with 12 poles and a four pole single phase 16.7 Hz AC synchronous generator. The rated voltage of the three-phase AC asynchronous machine and the traction current machine is 12.5 kV. The set has a length of 17.5 meters and a maximum width of 7 meters. The nominal power rating for each set is 70 megawatts, which are the largest traction current motor-generator sets ever built. It feeds the 110 kV balanced line traction power network through appropriate transformers. Power can be transferred from the GKN II nuclear generator over the 380 kV transmission network.

As of 2011, there was a traction current inverter with a transmission rate of 140 MW under construction. It uses GTOs manufactured by ABB.

== Cooling towers ==
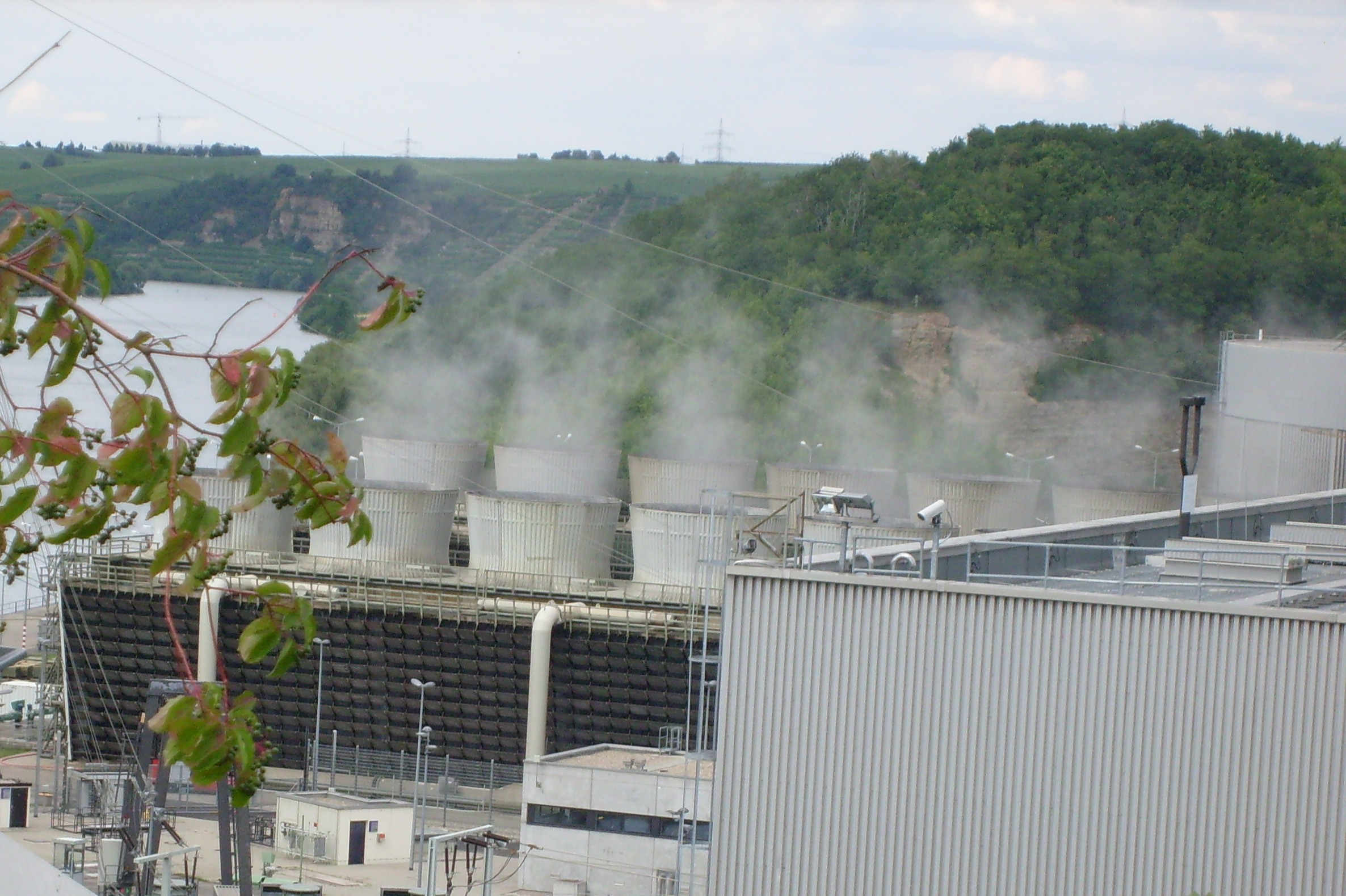
The cell cooling towers from Unit 1

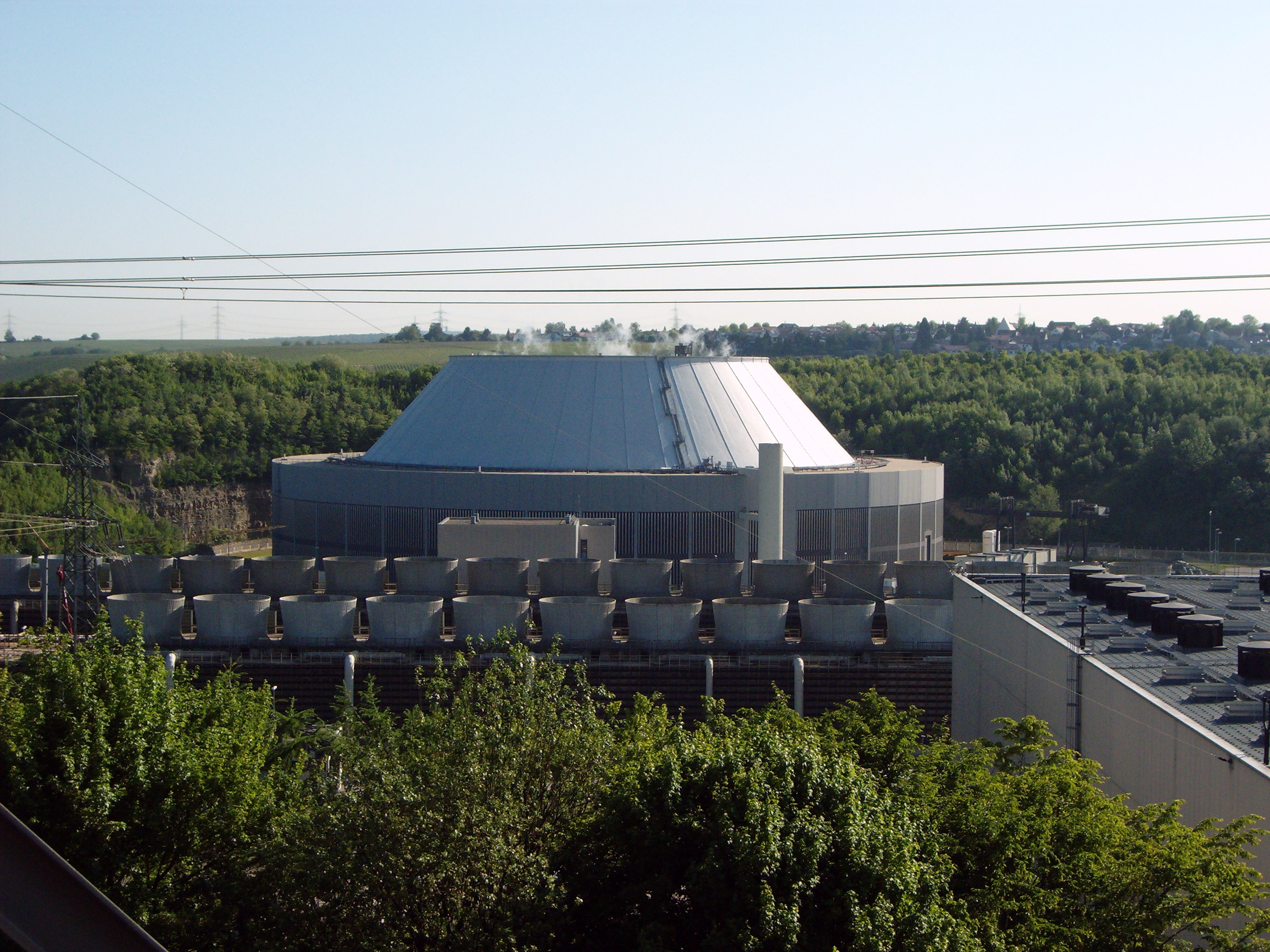
The "hybrid" cooling tower for the plant

In order to avoid overheating of the river Neckar, both blocks used cooling towers. These are not built in the usual way.

Unit I used two rows of cell cooling towers. Each row had a length of 186.8 meters and a height of 18 meters.

Unit II used a hybrid cooling tower with a height of 51.22 meters. It was originally going to use a wet cooling tower, but later it was decided to use dry cooling towers because it would have less effect on the environment though more expensive. This unique type of cooling tower causes the unique shape seen in pictures.

=== Hybrid cooling tower ===
- Overall height: 51 m
- Overall height over basin level: 48 m
- Mouth diameter: 160 m
- Basin diameter: 120 m
- Chimney height: 25 m
- Air outlet diameter: 75 m
- Cooling performance: 2,500 MW

== Malfunctions ==
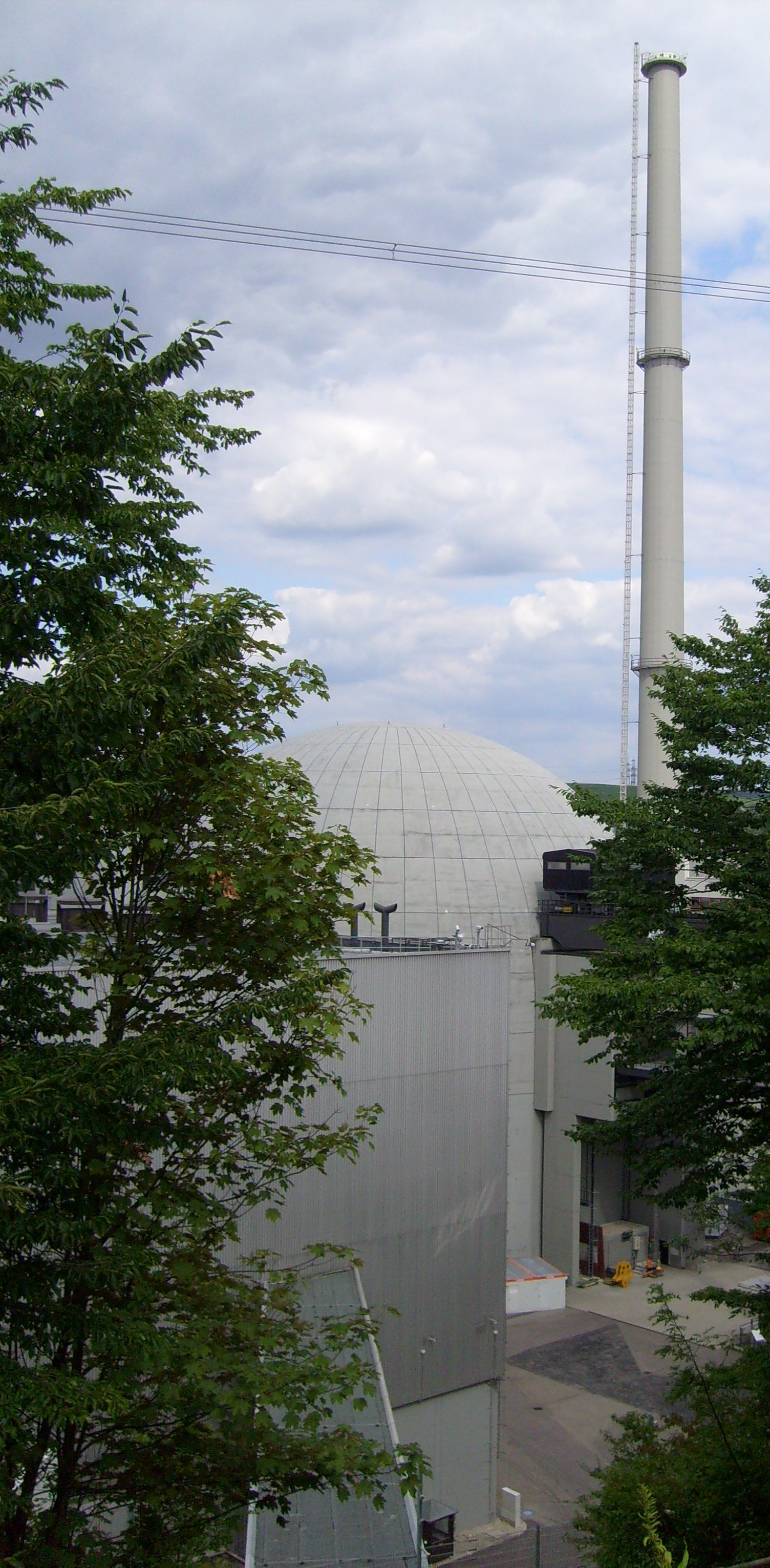
Unit 1

In 1977, Unit I had the second most serious incident of a nuclear power plant in the German Federal Republic to that date. Numerous errors of a new crew led to damage of the secondary cycle and, at the same time, a defect of a valve led to an automatic reactor shutdown.

On 27 July 2004, slightly radioactively contaminated water with two megabecquerel activity was discharged from Unit II into the Neckar river. As a result, for the first time in the Federal Republic, the operator company of a nuclear power plant paid a fine of €25,000 and a managing director was dismissed.

== Powerlines ==
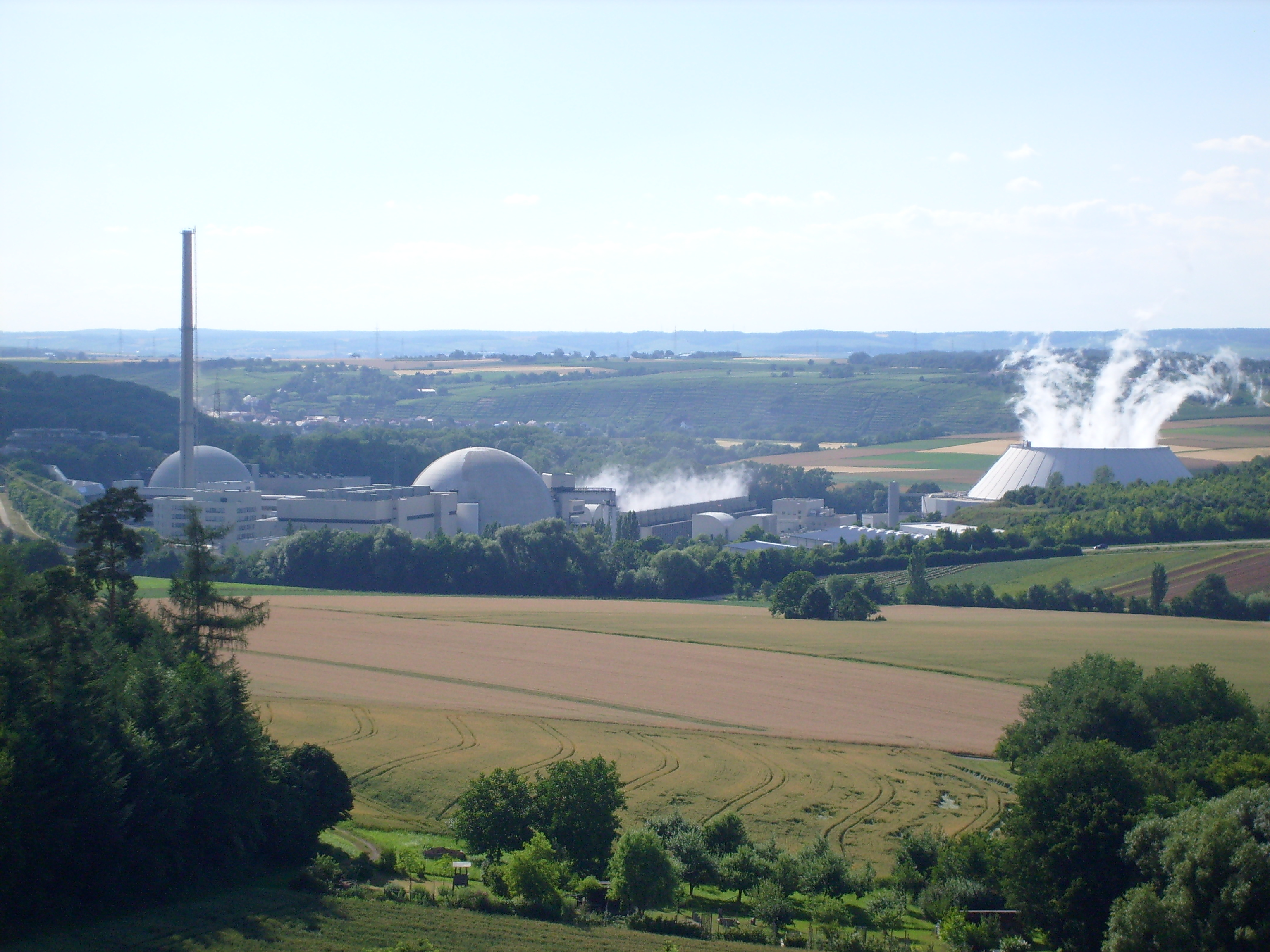
The Neckarwestheim Nuclear Power Plant photographed from the castle "Liebenstein" near Neckarwestheim

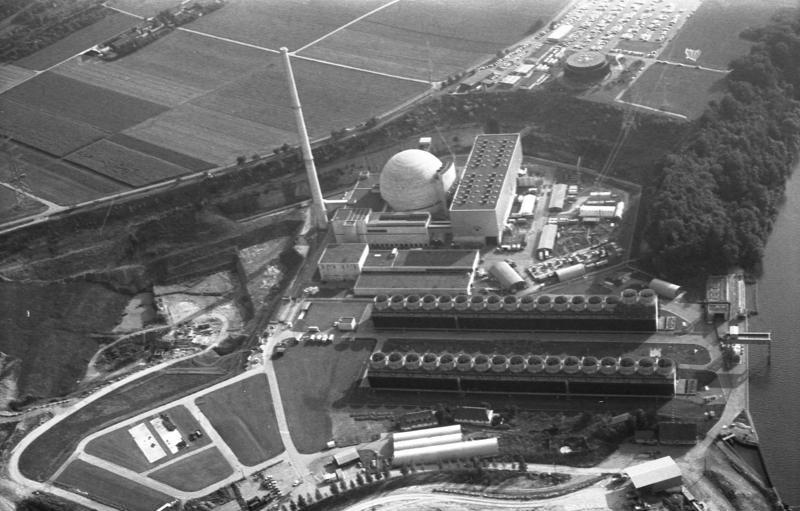
The nuclear power plant in 1979: only Unit 1 was operational, Unit 2 was under construction

Power produced at GKN was transmitted over a transmission line carrying two circuits of traction current and three-phase alternating current line to the 220 kV-three phase AC and the 110 kV-traction current switchyard situated east of Neckarwestheim. This line is hung on pylons of unusual design with five cross beams. On the lowest cross bar there are two traction current circuits, while the second, third and fourth cross beam carry the three-phase circuits. These are operated, in the case of the GKN 1, with 220 kV and in the case of the GKN 2 with 380 kV. On the highest cross beam two ground conductors are installed. It is notable that the traction current circuits were insulated for 220 kV, although they are operated only with 110 kV. This measure was taken because, in case of a disturbance of the parallel 380 kV-line, overvoltages can occur which insulation designed for 110 kV cannot stand.

The traction current lines from the GKN to the traction current switching station at Neckarwestheim, and from there to the central substation in Stuttgart Zazenhausen, are implemented as four-bundle conductors.

The three-phase 380 kV circuit leading away from the nuclear power station GKN 2 runs past the 220 kV-three phase switchyard at Neckarwestheim to the transformer station at Großgartach near Heilbronn. Another 110 kV-line for three phase AC with one circuit, originating in the switchgear of the coal-fired power station at Walheim also runs to the GKN. This line is used to power the plant on start-up or provide power in case of an emergency.

Neckarwestheim and the GKN have never had a track connection to the railway network.

== Public opposition ==
Geologist Hermann Behmel was a prominent opponent of the Neckarwestheim Nuclear Power Plant.
