= Lingen Nuclear Power Plant =

Shuttered nuclear power plant in Germany

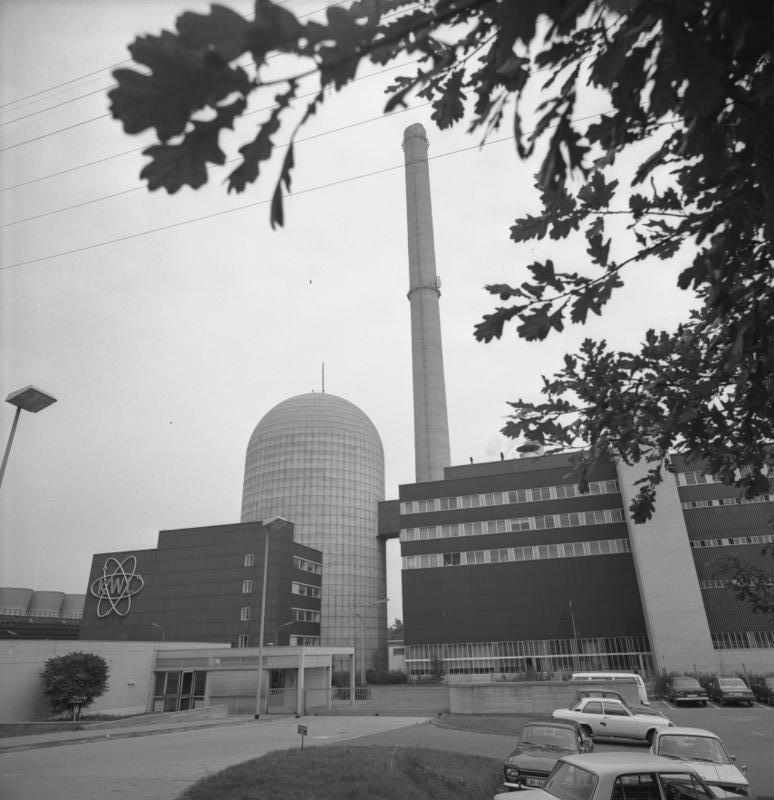
- Lingen Nuclear Power Plant in 1973
- Country: Germany
- Coordinates: 52°28′58″N 7°18′25″E
- Status: Decommissioned
- Construction began: October 1, 1964
- Commission date: July 1, 1968
- Decommission date: January 5, 1977
- Owner: RWE Power AG
- Operators: RWE Power; VEW

Nuclear power station
- Reactor type: BWR

Power generation
- Units decommissioned: 1 × 268 MW
- Nameplate capacity: 268 MW

External links
- Commons: Related media on Commons

Lingen Nuclear Power Plant is an inactive nuclear power plant in Germany, close to Emsland Nuclear Power Plant. It was constructed between 1964 and 1968 as a demonstration of safe and reliable nuclear power. Operation began on 1 October 1968.

It once belonged to VEW, and now belongs to RWE Power AG.

The plant was permanently shut down in 1977.

RWE has plans for a 400 MW 2-hour grid battery at the site, re-using the Amprion grid connection.
