= Isar Nuclear Power Plant =

Nuclear power plant in Germany

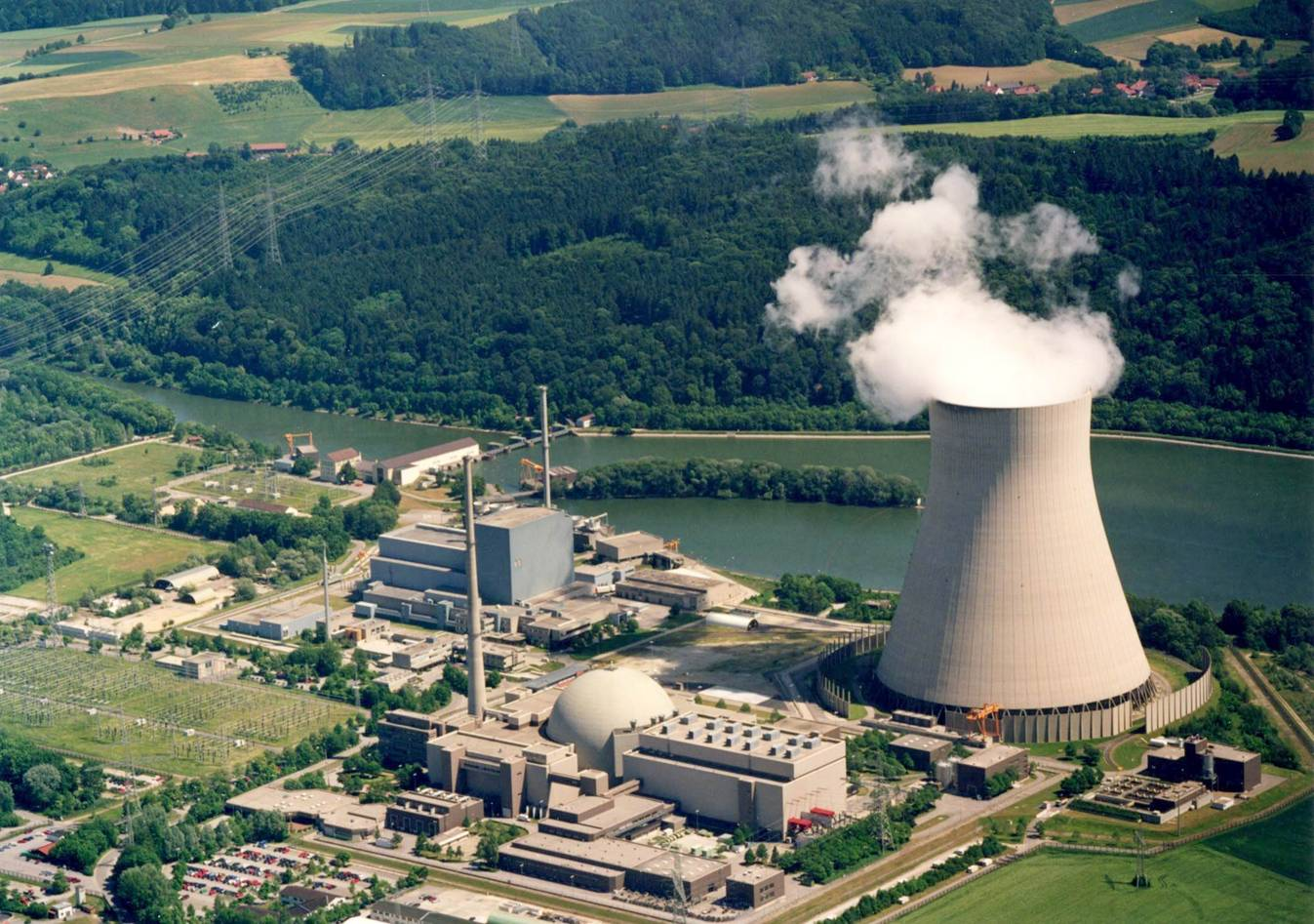
- Isar nuclear power plant
- Country: Germany
- Coordinates: 48°36′20.18″N 12°17′35.34″E
- Status: Decommissioned
- Construction began: 1971
- Commission date: 21 March 1979
- Decommission date: 15 April 2023
- Owners: Isar 1: PreussenElektra (100%); Isar 2: 75% PreussenElektra; 25% SWM
- Operator: PreussenElektra

Nuclear power station
- Reactor type: Unit 1 BWR; Unit 2 PWR
- Cooling towers: 1
- Cooling source: Isar River

Power generation
- Units decommissioned: 1 x 912 MW (Unit 1), 1 x 1485 MW (Unit 2)
- Nameplate capacity: 2,387 MW
- Capacity factor: 91.1%
- Annual net output: 19,051 GW·h

External links
- Website: Isar 1 and 2
- Commons: Related media on Commons

Isar I and Isar II were two nuclear power plants situated on the Isar river, 14 kilometres from Landshut, between Essenbach and Niederaichbach in Bavaria, Germany.

Isar I is a boiling water reactor which began operation in 1979 and was permanently shut down in 2011 as a result of the Fukushima disaster in Japan. It had a nameplate capacity of 912MWe. Isar II is a Konvoi-type pressurized water reactor which began operation in 1988 and has a nameplate capacity of 1485MWe. As part of the country's nuclear power phase-out, Isar II was taken out of service on 15 April 2023, being among the last 3 reactors in Germany still operating at this time.

== Safety ==
=== Passive safety features ===
The power plant has a number of passive safety features which work to meet safety goals during accident conditions. The reactor design uses a defense in depth approach in order to keep the radioactive inventory contained. Fuel pellets, fuel rod casings, reactor pressure vessel, biological shield, steel containment structure and the outer ferro concrete mantle are six of the most important parts of this defense in depth approach. Additional passive safety systems are hydrogen recombinatiors and cooling of the spent fuel pool through natural convection.

=== Active safety features ===
The passive safety installations are supplemented by a lot of automatically working active safety systems whose reliableness is based on their plural existence and their autonomously working in separate rooms. This is as necessary for the internal electric power supply as for the reactor cooling system, which guarantees the reliable thermal dissipation in every operating status, even when an implausible accident ingresses (for example a break of a primary coolant line). It constantly controls and compares all the important key operating parameters of the plant and activates automatically the necessary protection measures (independent from the plant operating personnel) if a parameter reaches a limit value. For example, the protection system may initiate a rapid shutdown and aftercooling procedure.

== Future developments ==
=== On-site storage facilities ===
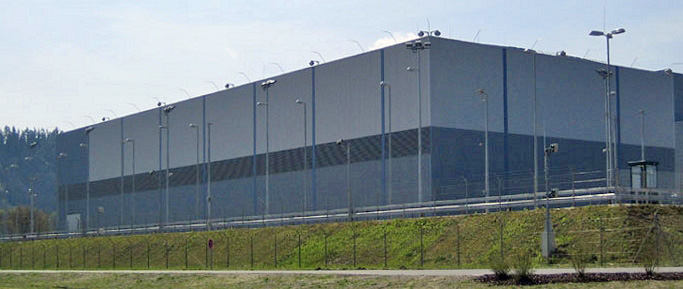
Fuel assembly container storage facility on the area of the Isar nuclear power plant

By law, all German nuclear power plants are forced to store their atomic waste in on-site storage facilities near the power plant. These temporary storage facilities have to be used until a final processing plant is built in a central location in Germany, to where all nuclear power plants will send their atomic waste. The usage of this storage is planned from 2030 onwards, so interim storage facilities are necessary.

The Isar nuclear power plant must also therefore have its own temporary storage facility, which has been under construction since 15 June 2004.

Work on the temporary storage facility at the Isar location was marked by protest actions from environmentalist and resident groups, which voiced concern about possible health effects.

The interim storage facility of Isar nuclear power plant is in use since 2007 and provides capacity for 152 fuel element containers.

=== Phasing-out of nuclear power ===
Concerns for the safety of nuclear power production were greatly increased after the Chernobyl accident in 1986, eventually leading to plans for its phase-out in certain countries. According to German Nuclear Phase-out regulations, Isar-I was to be shut down in 2011, with operations in Isar-II continuing until 2021. After the March 2011 Tōhoku earthquake and tsunami in Japan, however, the decision was made to expedite shutdown. Isar-I was closed as of 17 March 2011 for a three-month moratorium on nuclear power. The result of said moratorium was announced in the early hours of 30 May 2011 and stated that Isar-I would not return to operation. Isar-II, being one of the most powerful (ca. 1,400 MW) and modern reactors in Germany, ran until the end of the phase-out on April 15, 2023.

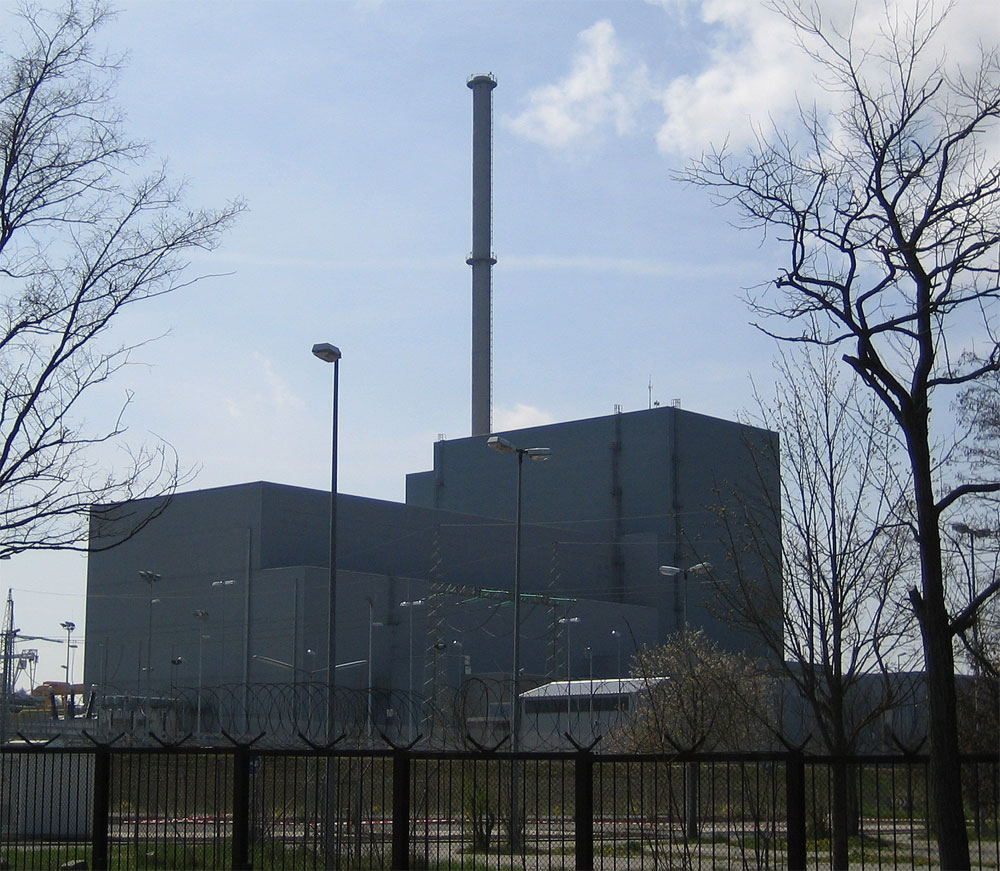
Isar 1 nuclear power plant

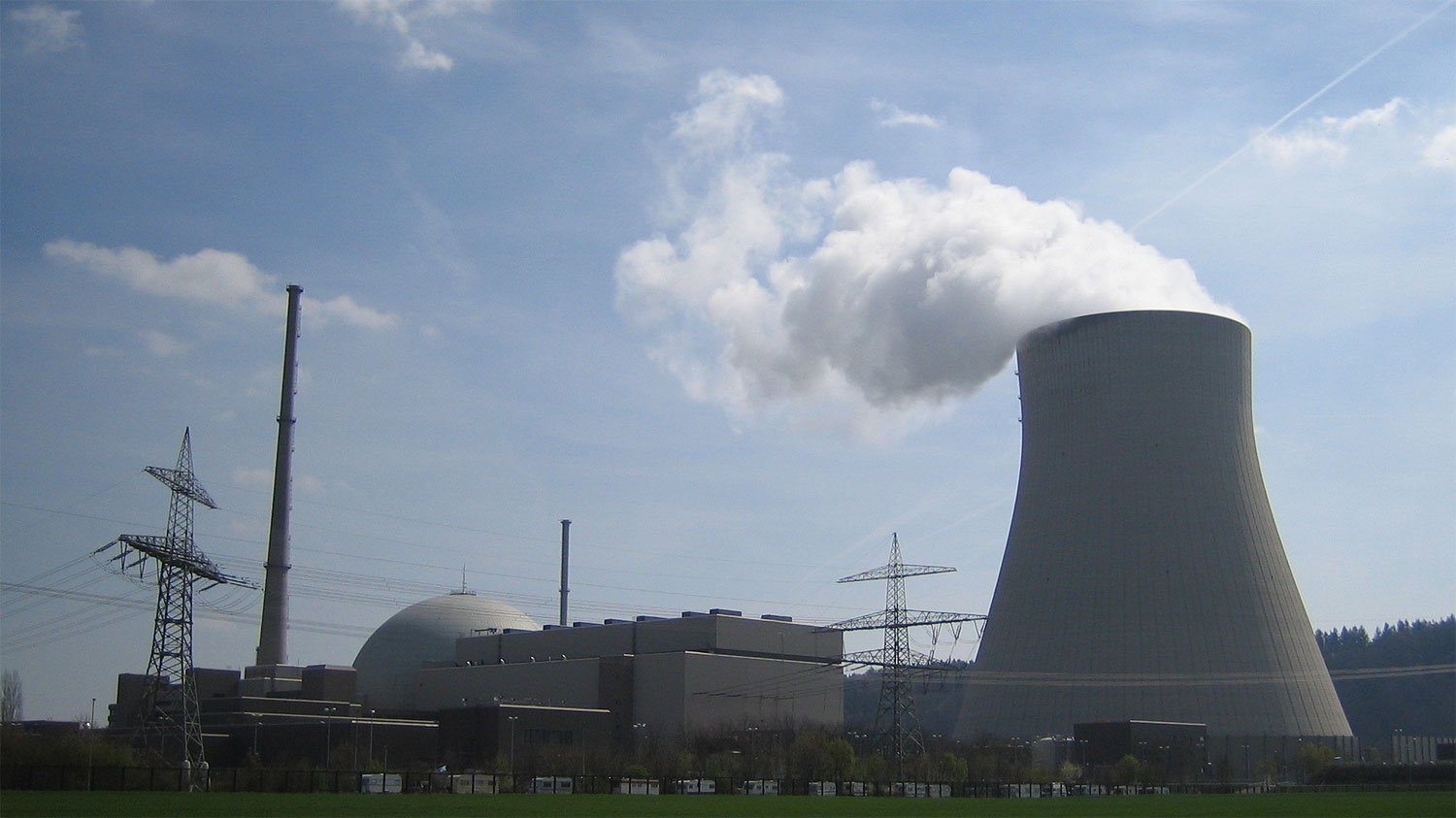
Isar 2 nuclear power plant

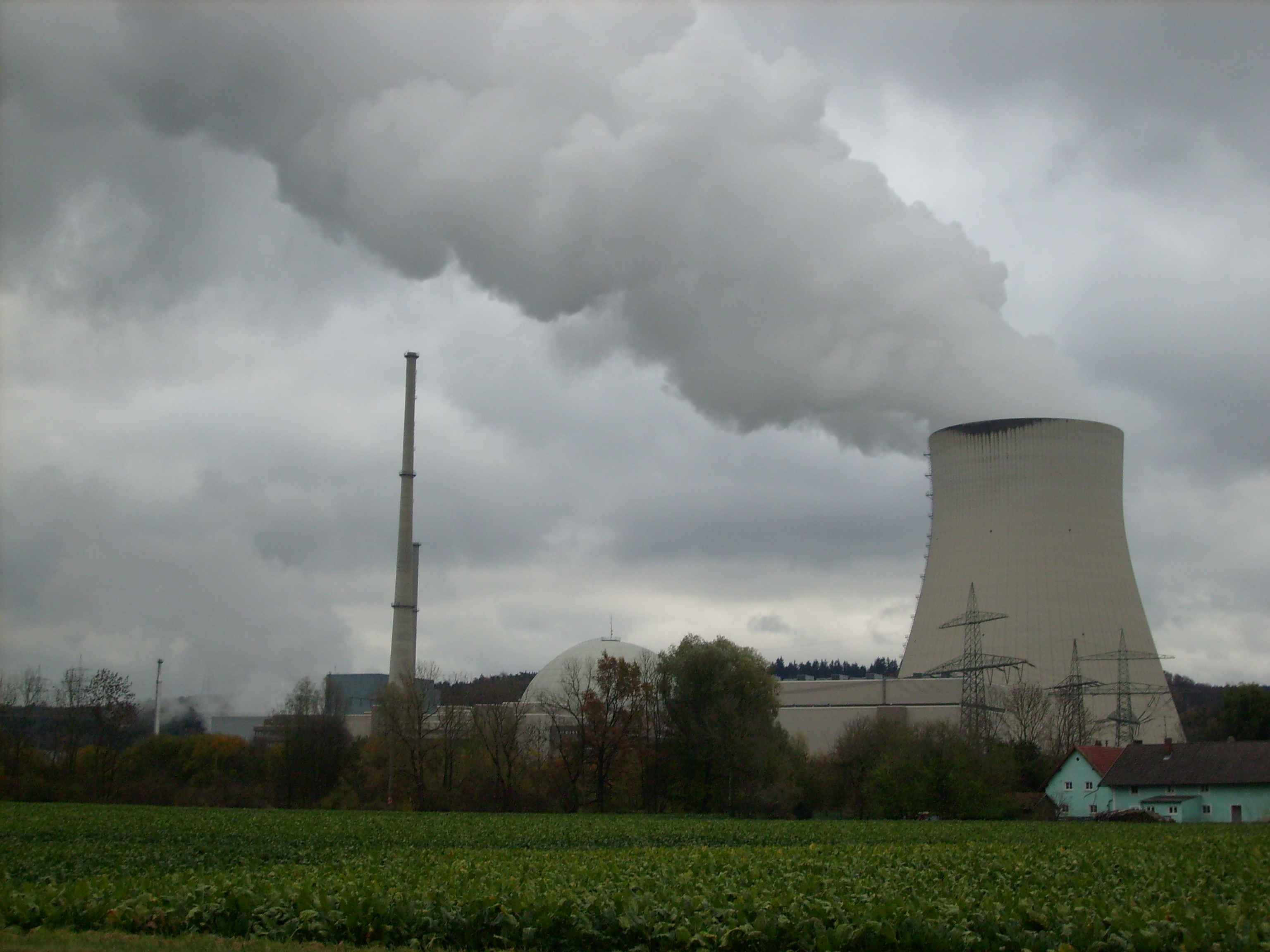
A view of the nuclear power plant

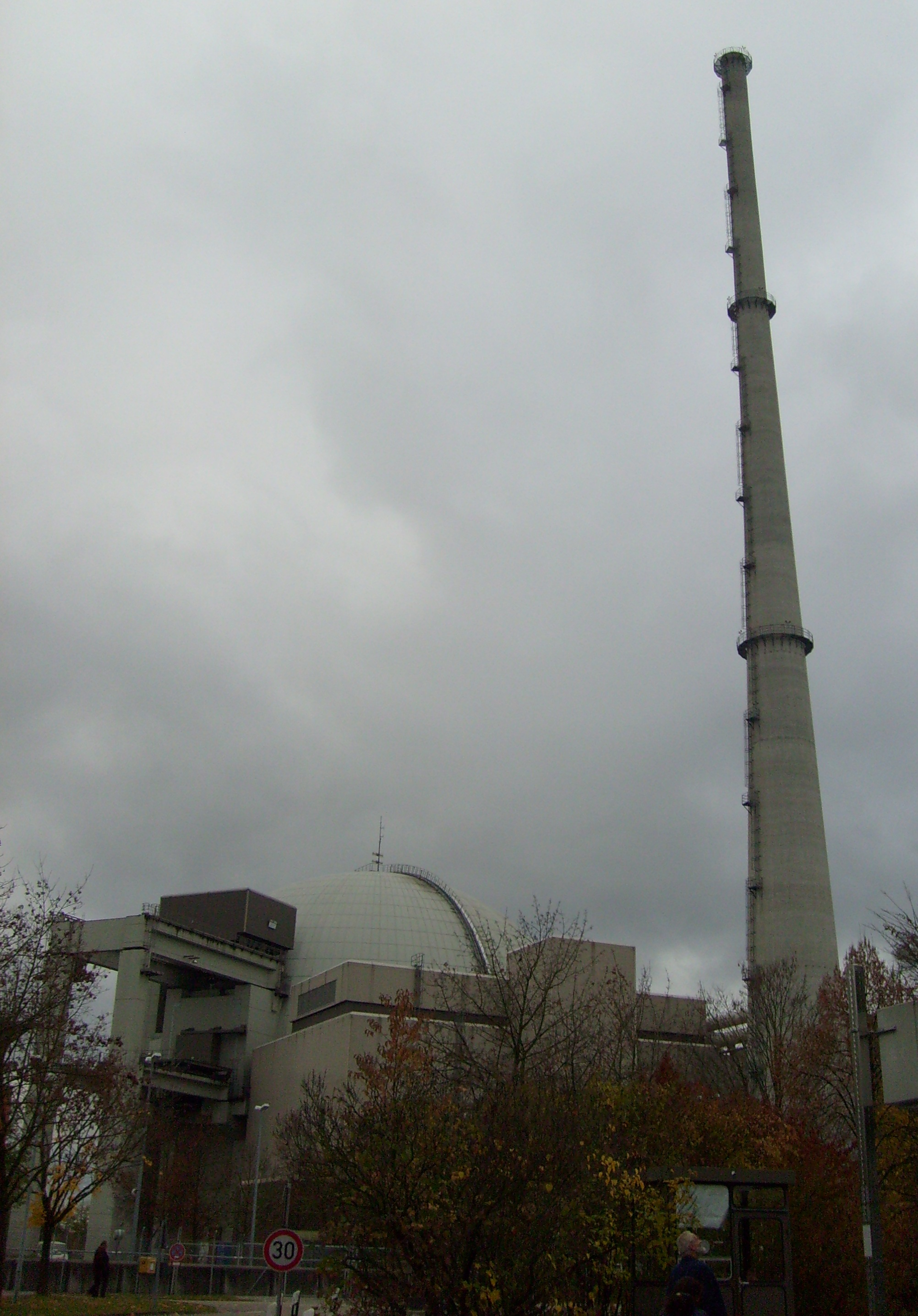
Isar 2
