= Vattenfall Europe Nuclear Energy GmbH =

Power company in Germany

Vattenfall Europe Nuclear Energy GmbH is a subsidiary of the Swedish power company Vattenfall that has majority and minority ownerships of three nuclear power plants around Hamburg in Germany. It is located in Überseering 12, 22297 Hamburg.

- Brunsbüttel Nuclear Power Plant (66,7% Vattenfall Europe Nuclear Energy GmbH, 33,3% E.ON), taken out of service in 2007.
- Krümmel Nuclear Power Plant (50% Vattenfall Europe Nuclear Energy GmbH, 50% E.ON), reactor not in service since 4 July 2009.
- Brokdorf Nuclear Power Plant (20% Vattenfall Europe Nuclear Energy GmbH, 80% E.ON)

== See also ==
- E.ON Kernkraft GmbH
