= VIAG =

VIAG can refer to:

- The ICAO airport code for Agra Airport in India
- VIAG, a German energy corporation that merged with VEBA in 2000 to form E.ON
