= Anti-nuclear movement in Germany =

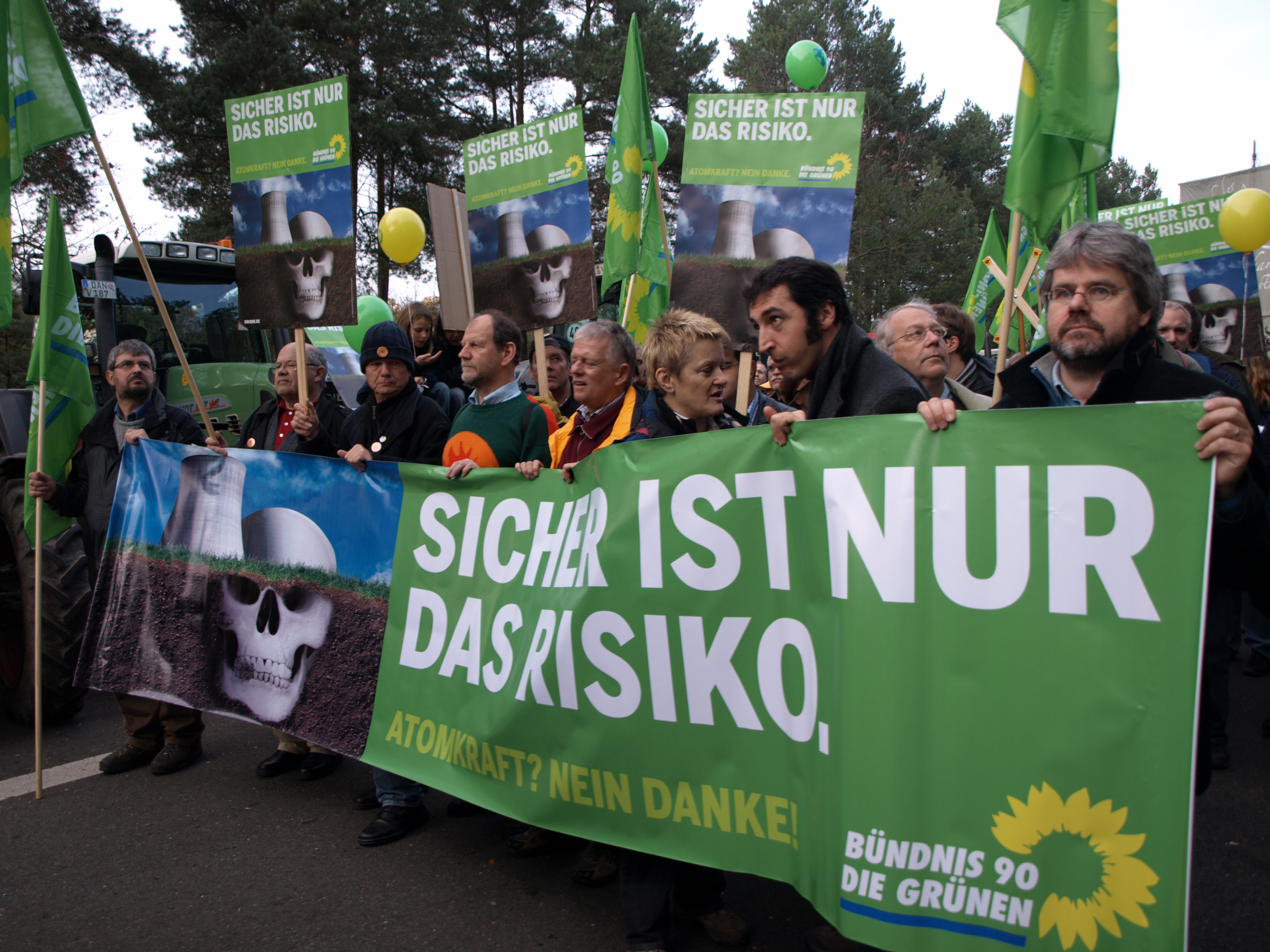
Anti-nuclear protesters of Alliance 90/The Greens party near a nuclear waste disposal centre at Gorleben, in northern Germany, on 8 November 2008. The sign says, "Only the risk is certain. Atomic power? No, thanks!"

Eight German nuclear power reactors (Biblis A and B, Brunsbuettel, Isar 1, Kruemmel, Neckarwestheim 1, Philippsburg 1 and Unterweser) were declared permanently shutdown on 6 August 2011, following the Japanese Fukushima nuclear disaster.

The anti-nuclear movement in Germany has a long history dating back to the early 1970s when large demonstrations prevented the construction of the Wyhl nuclear plant. The protests near the town of Wyhl were an example of a local community challenging the nuclear industry through a strategy of direct action and civil disobedience. Police were accused of using unnecessarily violent means. Anti-nuclear success at Wyhl inspired nuclear opposition throughout West Germany, in other parts of Europe, and in North America. A few years later protests raised against the NATO Double-Track Decision in West Germany and were followed by the foundation of the Green party.

In 1986, large parts of Germany were covered with radioactive contamination from the Chernobyl disaster and Germans went to great lengths to deal with the contamination. Germany's anti-nuclear stance was strengthened. From the mid-1990s onwards, anti-nuclear protests were primarily directed against transports of radioactive waste in "CASTOR" containers.

In September 2010, German government policy shifted back toward nuclear energy, and this generated some new anti-nuclear sentiment in Berlin and beyond. On 18 September 2010, tens of thousands of Germans surrounded Chancellor Angela Merkel's office. In October 2010, tens of thousands of people protested in Munich. In November 2010, there were violent protests against a train carrying reprocessed nuclear waste.

Within days of the March 2011 Fukushima Daiichi nuclear disaster, large anti-nuclear protests occurred in Germany. Chancellor Angela Merkel promptly "imposed a three-month moratorium on previously announced extensions for Germany's existing nuclear power plants, while shutting seven of the 17 reactors that had been operating since 1981". Protests continued and, on 29 May 2011, Merkel's government announced that it would close all of its nuclear power plants by 2022. Galvanised by the Fukushima nuclear disaster, first anniversary anti-nuclear demonstrations were held in Germany in March 2012. Organisers say more than 50,000 people in six regions took part.

In April 2023, the last of Germany's nuclear power plants ceased operation. Critics have commented that these closures have resulted in Germany becoming largely reliant on fossil fuels for the majority of its energy production, predominantly coal mined within Germany, and imported natural gas mainly from Russia.

== Early years ==
German publications of the 1950s and 1960s contained criticism of some features of nuclear power including its safety. Nuclear waste disposal was widely recognized as a major problem, with concern publicly expressed as early as 1954. In 1964, one author went so far as to state "that the dangers and costs of the necessary final disposal of nuclear waste could possibly make it necessary to forego the development of nuclear energy".

In the early 1960s, there was a proposal to build a nuclear power station in West Berlin, but the project was dropped in 1962. Another attempt to site a reactor in a major city was made in 1967, when BASF planned to build a nuclear power station on its ground at Ludwigshafen, to supply process steam. Eventually the project was withdrawn by BASF.

The tiny hamlet of Wyhl, located at the Rhine just outside the Kaiserstuhl wine-growing area in the southwestern corner of Germany, near France and Switzerland, was first mentioned in 1971 as a possible site for the Wyhl Nuclear Power Plant. In the years that followed, local opposition steadily mounted, but this had little impact on politicians and planners. Official permission for the plant was granted and earthworks began on 17 February 1975. On 18 February, local people spontaneously occupied the site and police removed them forcibly two days later. Television coverage of police dragging away farmers and their wives through the mud helped to turn nuclear power into a major national issue. The rough treatment was widely condemned and made the wine-growers, clergy, and others all the more determined. Some local police refused to take part in the action.

Subsequent support came from the nearby university town of Freiburg. On 23 February about 30,000 people re-occupied the Wyhl site and plans to remove them were abandoned by the state government in view of the large number involved and potential for more adverse publicity. On 21 March 1975, an administrative court withdrew the construction licence for the plant. The plant was never built and the land eventually became a nature reserve.

The Wyhl occupation generated extensive national debate. This initially centred on the state government's handling of the affair and associated police behaviour, but interest in nuclear issues was also stimulated. The Wyhl experience encouraged the formation of citizen action groups near other planned nuclear sites. Many other anti-nuclear groups formed elsewhere, in support of these local struggles, and some existing citizens' action groups widened their aims to include the nuclear issue. This is how the German anti-nuclear movement evolved. Anti-nuclear success at Wyhl also inspired nuclear opposition in the rest of Europe and North America.

== Other protests ==
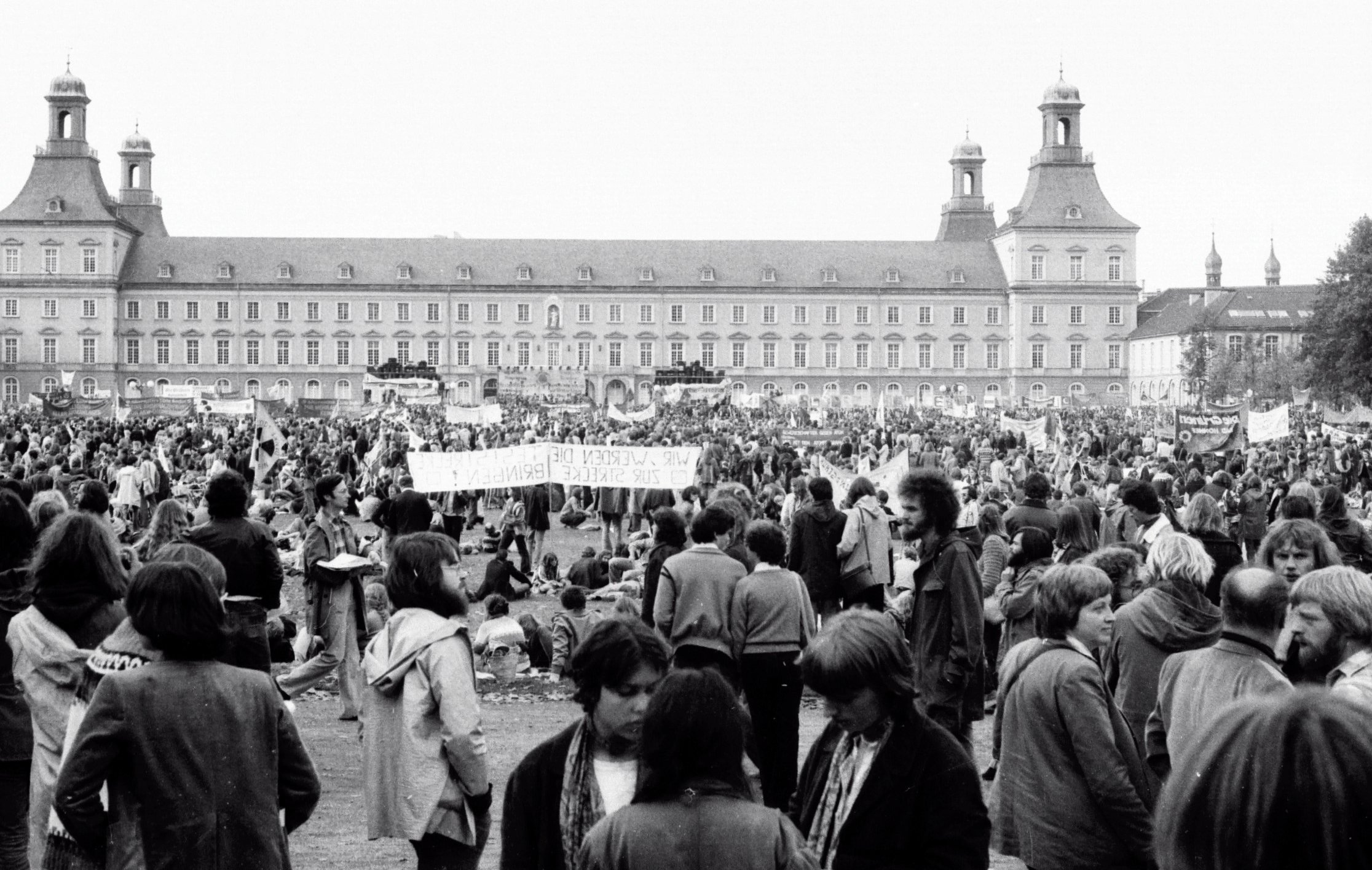
120,000 people attended an anti-nuclear protest in Bonn, West Germany, on 14 October 1979, following the Three Mile Island accident.

In 1976 and 1977, mass demonstrations took place at Kalkar, the site of Germany's first fast breeder reactor, and at Brokdorf, north of Hamburg. Some of these demonstrations, which always started peacefully, were organized by the World Union for Protection of Life. The circumstances at Brokdorf were similar to those at Wyhl, in that the behaviour of the police was again crucial:

The authorities had rushed through the licensing process, and police occupied the site hours before the first construction license was granted, in order to prevent a repetition of Wyhl. Demonstrators trying to enter the site a few days later got harsh treatment, and all this helped consolidate the population in opposition.

In February 1977 the Minister-President of Lower Saxony, Ernst Albrecht of the Christian Democratic Union, announced that the salt mines in Gorleben would be utilised to store radioactive waste. New protests by the local population and opponents of nuclear power broke out and approximately 20,000 people attended the first large demonstration in Gorleben on 12 March 1977. Protests about Gorleben continued for several years and, in 1979, the prime minister declared that plans for a nuclear waste plant in Gorleben were "impossible to enforce for political reasons".

In 1980 an Enquete Commission of the Bundestag proposed "a paradigmatic change in energy policy away from nuclear power". This contributed to a broad shift in German public opinion, the formation of the Green Party, and its election to the German Bundestag in 1983.

In the early 1980s plans to build a nuclear fuel reprocessing plant in the Bavarian town of Wackersdorf lead to major protests. In 1986, West German police were confronted by demonstrators armed with slingshots, crowbars and Molotov cocktails at the site of a nuclear reprocessing plant in Wackersdorf. The plans for the plant were abandoned in 1988. It still isn't clear whether protests or plant economics led to the decision.

In 1981, Germany's largest anti-nuclear demonstration took place to protest against the construction of the Brokdorf Nuclear Power Plant on the North Sea coast west of Hamburg. Some 100,000 people came face to face with 10,000 police officers. Twenty-one policemen were injured by demonstrators armed with gasoline bombs, sticks, stones and high-powered slingshots. The plant began operations in October 1986 and was closed on 31 December 2021.

== Chernobyl disaster ==
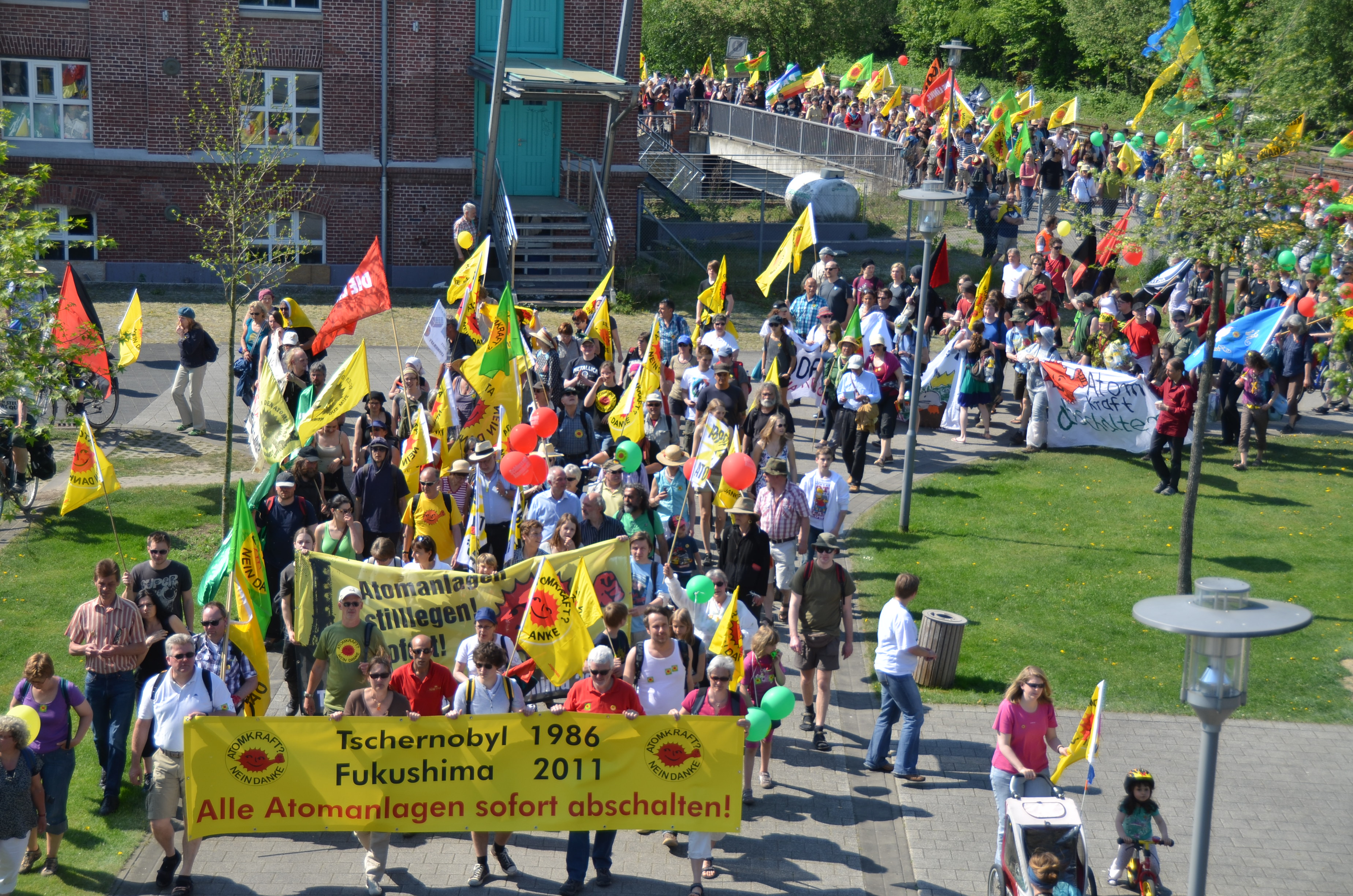
Demonstration commemorating the 25th anniversary of the Chernobyl disaster, Gronau, 25 April 2011

The Chernobyl disaster in 1986 was a pivotal event for Germany's anti-nuclear movement. After the radioactive fallout cloud covered large parts of the country, Germans went to great lengths to deal with the contamination. Contaminated crops were destroyed, firemen dressed in protective gear cleaned cars as they crossed the border from other countries, and sand in playground sandboxes was replaced. The average German was exposed to approximately 0.3 mSv with some areas reaching 1.0 mSv, an increase of between 15 and 50% over local background radiation levels.

Following Chernobyl, the Green Party strived "for the immediate shut-down of all nuclear facilities". The SPD pushed for a nuclear phase-out within ten years. Länder governments, municipalities, parties and trade unions explored the question of "whether the use of nuclear power technology was reasonable and sensible for the future".

In May 1986 clashes between anti-nuclear protesters and West German police became common. More than 400 people were injured in mid-May at the site of a nuclear-waste reprocessing plant being built near Wackersdorf. Police "used water cannons and dropped tear-gas grenades from helicopters to subdue protesters armed with slingshots, crowbars and Molotov cocktails".

== More recent developments ==
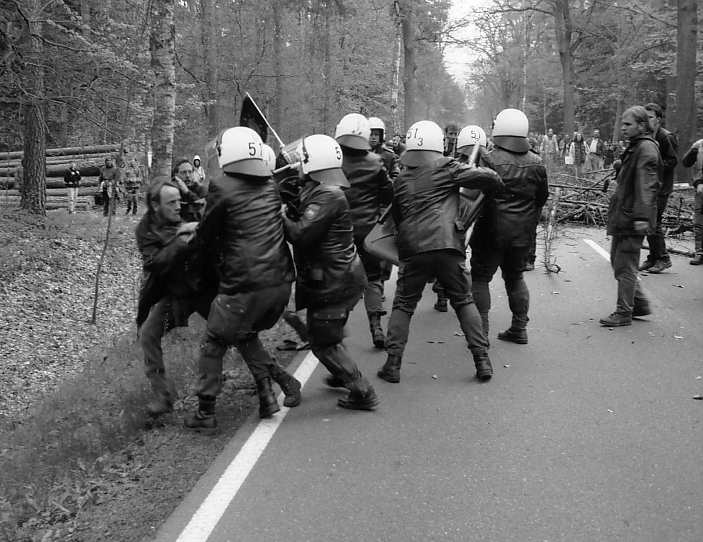
Riots at anti-nuclear demonstrations near Gorleben, Lower Saxony, Germany, 8 May 1996

Several advanced reactor designs in Germany were unsuccessful. Two fast breeder reactors were built, but both were closed in 1991 without the larger ever having achieved criticality. The High Temperature Reactor THTR-300 at Hamm-Uentrop, under construction since 1970, was started in 1983, but was shut down in September 1989.

The anti-nuclear protests were also a driving force of the green movement in Germany, from which the party The Greens evolved. When they first came to power in the Schröder administration of 1998 they achieved their major political goal for which they had fought for 20 years: abandoning nuclear energy in Germany.

From the mid-1990s onwards, anti-nuclear protests were primarily directed against transports of radioactive waste called "castor" containers. In 1996 there were sit-ins against the second castor consignment bringing nuclear waste from La Hague in France to Gorleben. In 1997 the third castor transport reached Gorleben despite the efforts of several thousand protesters.

In 2002, the "Act on the structured phase-out of the utilization of nuclear energy for the commercial generation of electricity" took effect, following a drawn-out political debate and lengthy negotiations with nuclear power plant operators. The act legislated for the shut-down of all German nuclear plants by 2021. The Stade Nuclear Power Plant was the first one to go offline in November 2003, followed by the Obrigheim Nuclear Power Plant in 2005. Block-A of the Biblis Nuclear Power Plant has been shut down in 2008. Block-B had been going back online after a year-long shutdown on 13 or 14 December 2007 and had been scheduled to keep operating until 2009 or 2012.

In 2007, amid concerns that Russian energy supplies to western Europe may not be reliable, conservative politicians, including Chancellor Angela Merkel and Economics Minister Michael Glos, continued to question the decision to phase out nuclear power in Germany. WISE along with other anti-nuclear movement groups contend that the climate problem can only be solved by the use of renewable forms of energy along with efficient and economical energy technologies.

In summer 2008, a cover of the German magazine Der Spiegel read Atomkraft – Das unheimliche Comeback (Nuclear Power – Its eerie comeback). As a consequence, the German anti-nuclear organisation .ausgestrahlt decided to coordinate the various anti-nuclear movements on their website leading to a more powerful protest. Anti-nuclear Monday evening walks become popular in various German cities.

In November 2008, a shipment of radioactive waste from German nuclear plants arrived at a storage site near Gorleben after being delayed by large protests from nuclear activists. More than 15,000 people took part in the protests which involved blocking trucks with sit-down demonstrations and blocking the route with tractors. The demonstrations were partly a response to conservative calls for a rethink of the planned phaseout of nuclear power stations.

In April 2009, activists blocked the entrance to controversial Neckarwestheim Nuclear Power Plant with an 8-metre wall. Their protest coincided with the annual meeting of the company that runs the plant, EnBW Energie Baden-Württemberg.

Also in April 2009 about 1,000 people demonstrated against nuclear power generation in the north-western city of Münster. Located southwest of Hamburg, Münster is adjoined by a nuclear waste dump at Ahaus, Germany's only uranium enrichment plant at Gronau and another such plant at Almelo in neighbouring The Netherlands.

On 24 April 2010, about 120,000 people built a human chain (KETTENreAKTION!) between the nuclear plants Krümmel and Brunsbüttel. This way they were demonstrating against the plans of the German government to extend the period of producing nuclear power. Demonstrations were also held in other German cities "where public opinion is mainly opposed to nuclear energy".

In September 2010, German government policy shifted back toward nuclear energy, and this generated some new anti-nuclear sentiment in Berlin and beyond. On 18 September 2010, tens of thousands of Germans surrounded Chancellor Angela Merkel's office in an anti-nuclear demonstration that organisers said was the biggest of its kind since the Chernobyl disaster in 1986. In October 2010, tens of thousands of people protested in Munich against the nuclear power policy of Chancellor Angela Merkel's coalition government. Protesters called for a move away from nuclear power towards renewable energy. The action was the biggest anti-nuclear event in Bavaria for more than two decades.

In November 2010, police wielding batons clashed with protesters who disrupted the passage of a train carrying reprocessed nuclear waste from France to Germany. The train carrying the nuclear waste was heading for Dannenberg where the 123 tonnes of waste was loaded onto trucks and taken to the nearby storage facility of Gorleben, in central Germany. Tens of thousands of protesters gathered in Dannenberg to signal their opposition to the cargo. Organisers said 50,000 people had turned out but police said the figure was closer to 20,000. Around 16,000 police were mobilised to deal with the protests.

== Post Fukushima ==
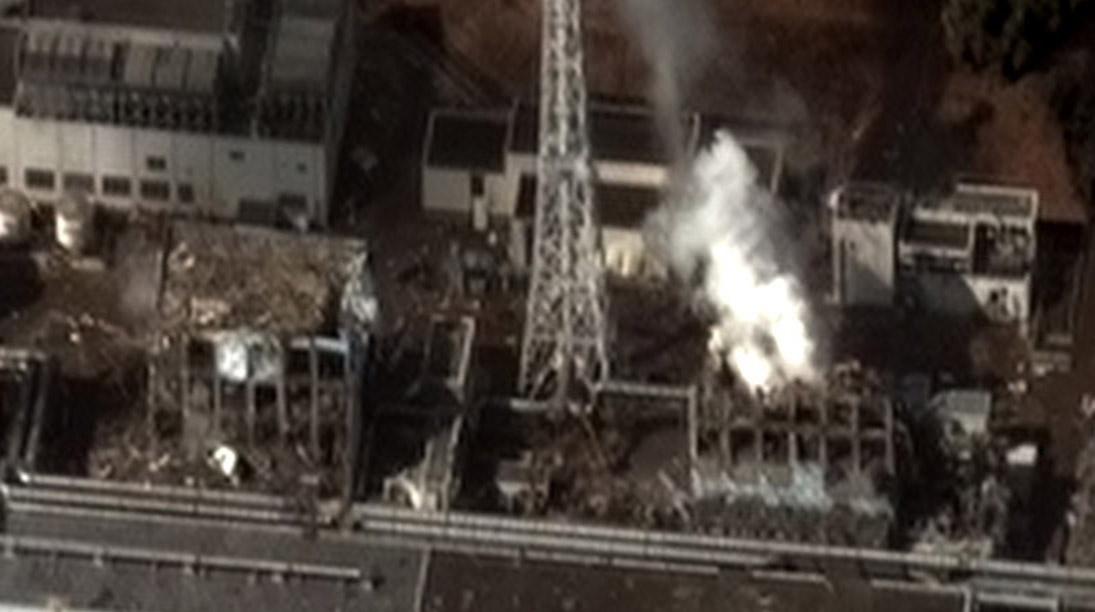
The 2011 Fukushima Daiichi nuclear disaster in Japan, the worst nuclear accident in 25 years, displaced 50,000 households after radiation leaked into the air, soil and sea. Radiation checks led to bans of some shipments of vegetables and fish.

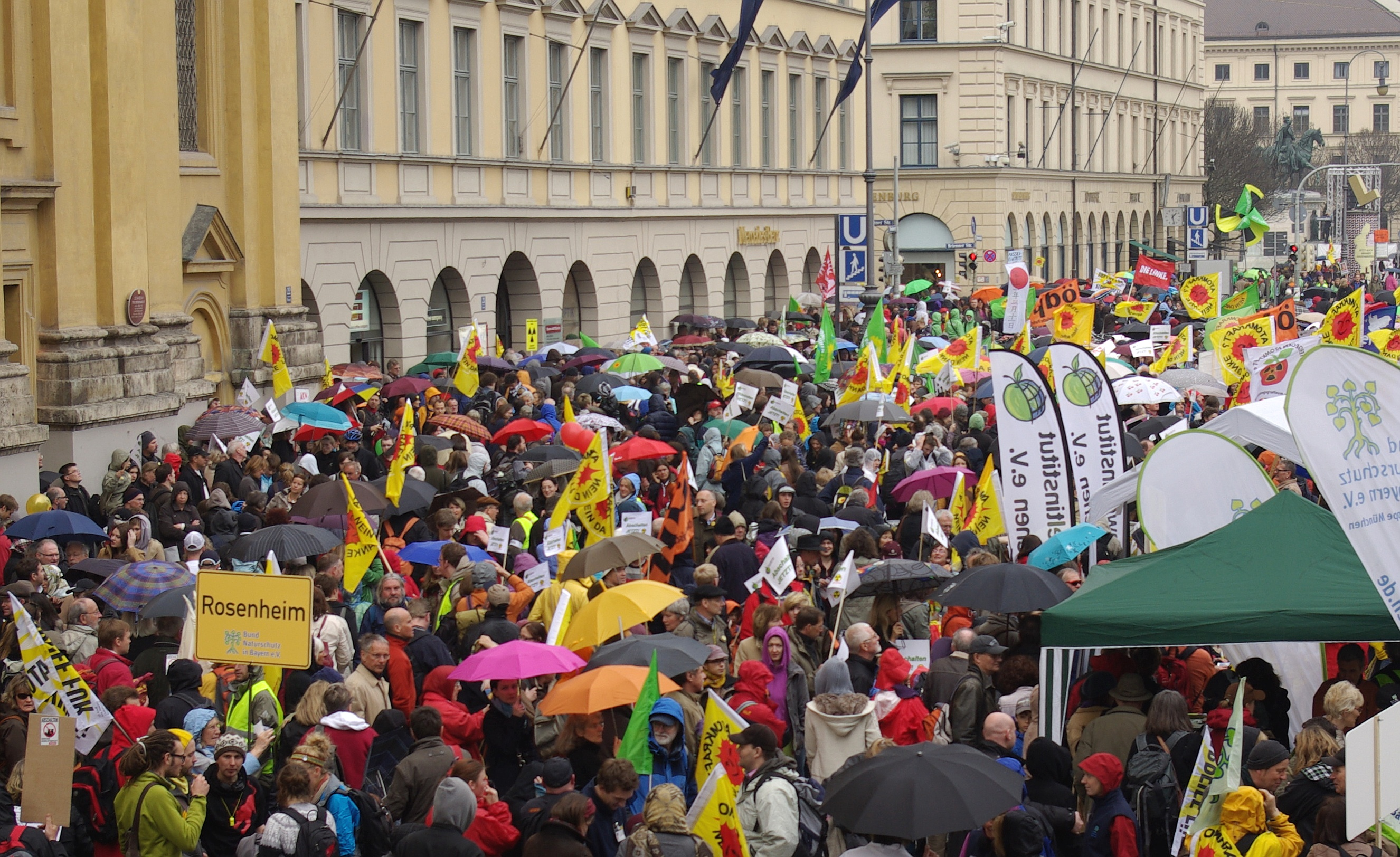
Anti-nuclear demonstration in Munich, March 2011

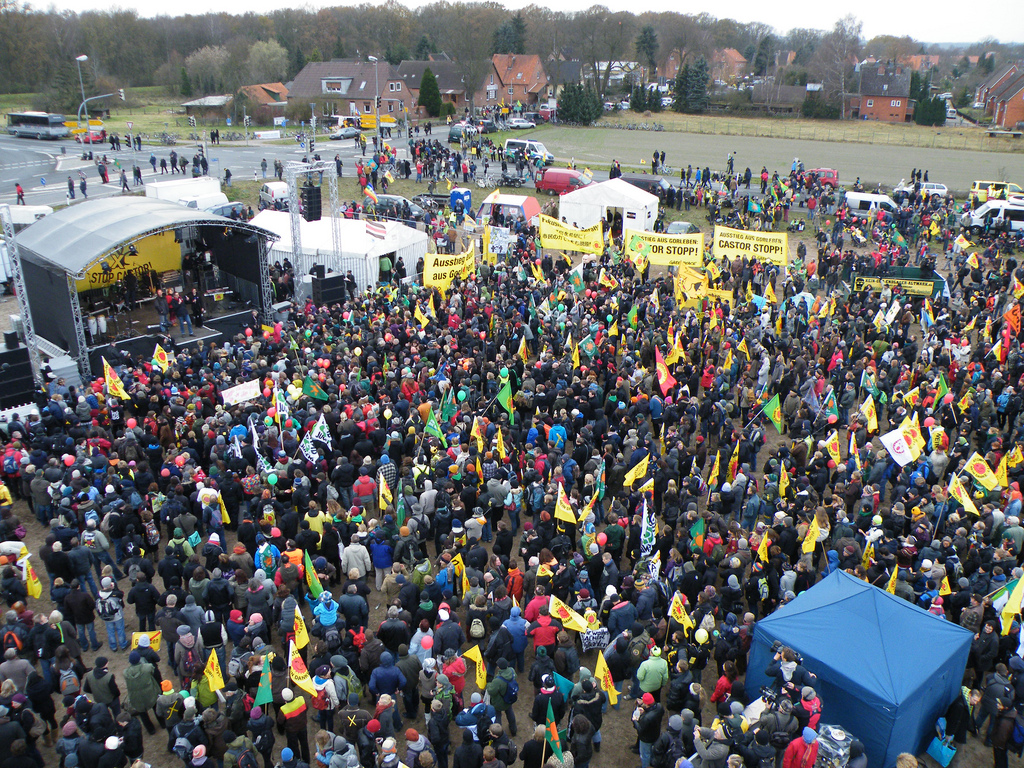
Castor demonstration in Dannenberg, November 2011

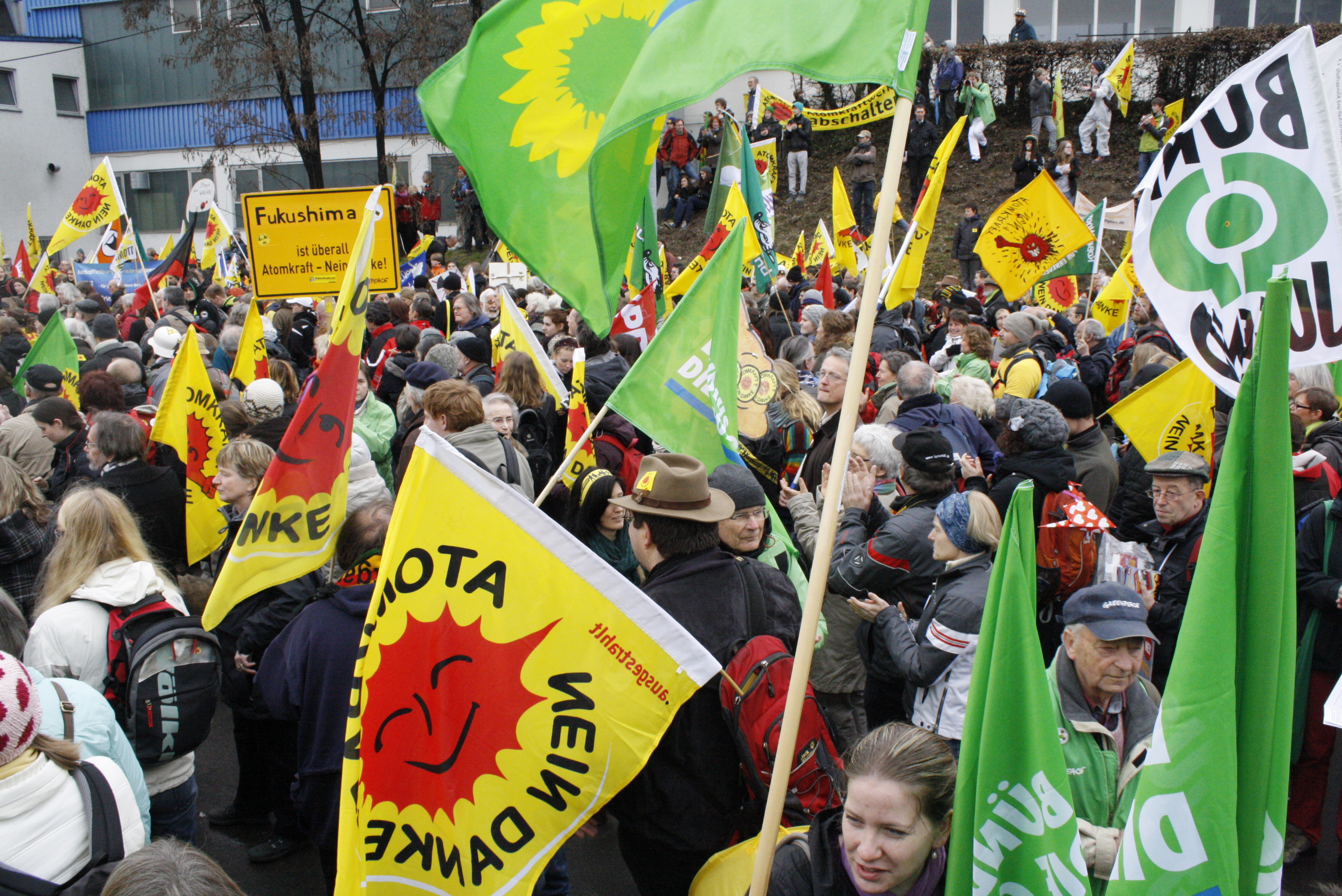
Protest at Neckarwestheim, 11 March 2012

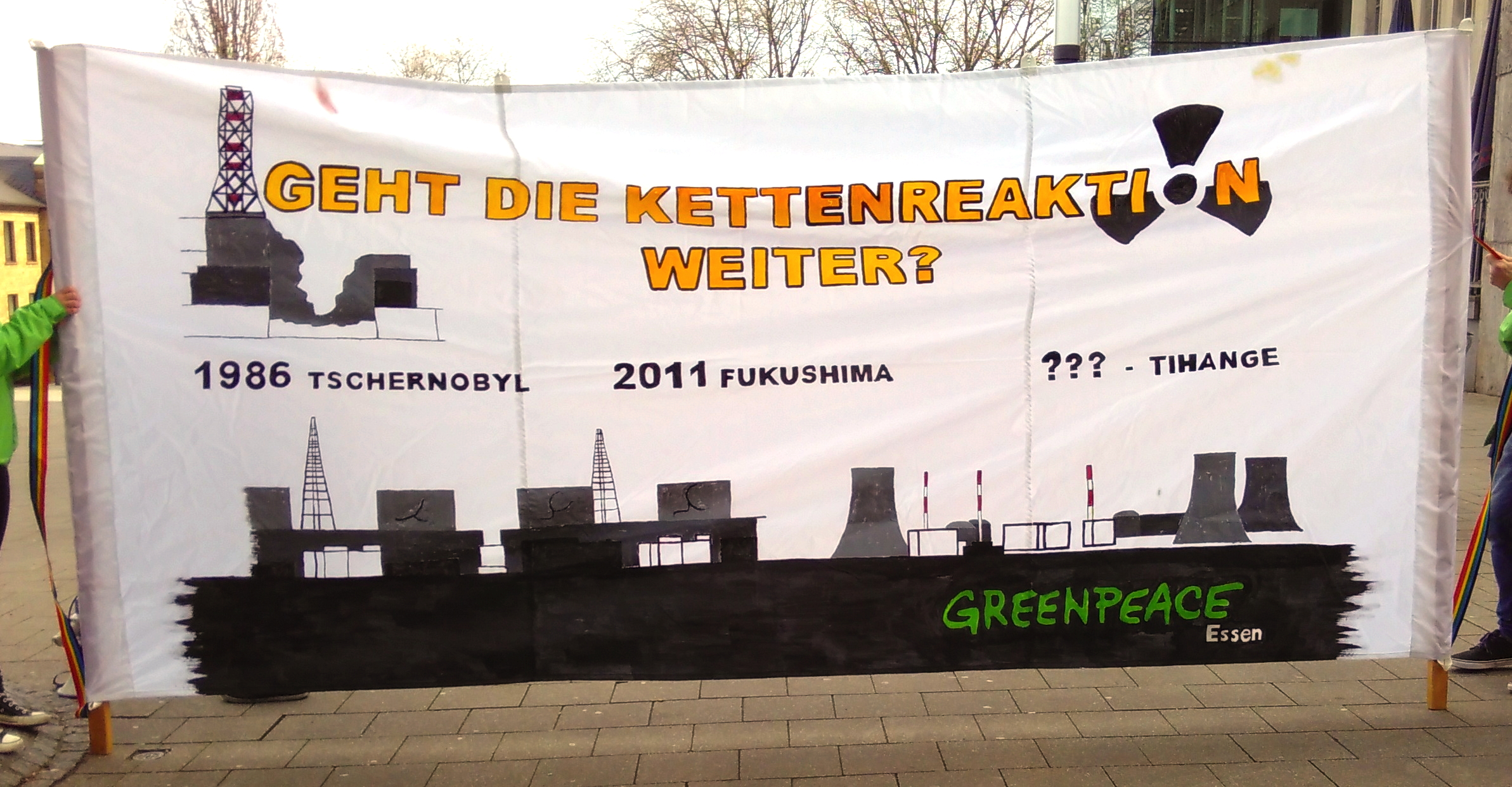
Does the chain reaction continue? 1986 Chernobyl 2011 Fujushima ??? Tihange

In light of the Fukushima nuclear disaster, public opposition intensified. 60,000 Germans participated in a protest on 12 March 2011, forming a 45-km human chain from Stuttgart to the Neckarwestheim power plant. 110,000 people protested in 450 other German towns on 14 March, with opinion polls indicating 80% of Germans opposed the government's extension of nuclear power. On 15 March 2011, Angela Merkel said that seven nuclear power plants which went online before 1980 would be temporarily closed and the time would be used to study speedier renewable energy commercialization. Merkel had effectively reversed a previous decision to keep older nuclear plants operating beyond their previously designated life span.

Former proponents of nuclear energy such as Angela Merkel, Guido Westerwelle, Stefan Mappus have changed their positions, yet 71% of the population believe that to be a tactical manoeuvre related to upcoming state elections. In the largest anti-nuclear demonstration ever held in Germany, some 250,000 people protested on 26 March under the slogan "Fukushima reminds – shut off all nuclear plants." The 27 March state elections in Baden-Württemberg and Rhineland-Palatinate saw the Greens gain their voting share significantly as a result of their long-time anti-nuclear politics, ending up with the second largest share of the vote in the Baden-Württemberg election.

In March 2011, more than 200,000 people took part in anti-nuclear protests in four large German cities, on the eve of state elections. Organisers called it the biggest anti-nuclear demonstration the country has seen, with police estimating that 100,000 people turned out in Berlin alone. Hamburg, Munich and Cologne also saw big demonstrations. The New York Times reported that "most Germans have a deep-seated aversion to nuclear power, and the damage at the Fukushima Daiichi plant in Japan has galvanized opposition". Thousands of Germans demanding an end to the use of nuclear power took part in nationwide demonstrations on 2 April 2011. About 7,000 people took part in anti-nuclear protests in Bremen. About 3,000 people protested outside of RWE's headquarters in Essen. Other smaller rallies were held elsewhere.

Chancellor Angela Merkel's coalition announced on 30 May 2011, that Germany's 17 nuclear power stations will be shut down by 2022, in a policy reversal following Japan's Fukushima I nuclear accidents. Seven of the German power stations were closed temporarily in March, and they will remain off-line and be permanently decommissioned. An eighth was already off line, and will stay so. Between 2011 and 2014 Germany burned more coal, an additional 9.5 million tonnes of oil equivalent.

In November 2011, thousands of anti-nuclear protesters delayed a train carrying radioactive waste from France to Germany. Many clashes and obstructions made the journey the slowest one since the annual shipments of radioactive waste began in 1995. The shipment, the first since Japan's Fukishima nuclear disaster, faced large protests in France where activists damaged the train tracks. Thousands of people in Germany also interrupted the train's journey, forcing it to proceed at a snail's pace, covering 1,200 kilometers (746 miles) in 109 hours. More than 200 people were reported injured in the protests and several arrests were made. Galvanised by the Fukushima nuclear disaster, first anniversary anti-nuclear demonstrations were held in Germany in March 2012. Organisers say more than 50,000 people in six regions took part.

== Timeline ==
Spiegel Online has presented this timeline of events associated with the anti-nuclear power movement in Germany:

- 1975: Fight about a proposed new nuclear power plant for Whyl.
- 1976: Clashes between police and protesters at the Brokdorf construction site.
- 1977: Clashes between anti-nuclear activists and security forces at Brokdorf.
- 1977: 50,000 people protested against the construction of a fast-breeder reactor at Kalkar in the lower Rhine region.
- 1979: Following the Three Mile Island accident, 100,000 people demonstrated against plans for a reprocessing plant at Gorleben
- 1979: The anti-nuclear movement grows and 150,000 people demonstrated in Bonn, demanding the closure of all nuclear facilities.
- 1980: 5,000 people occupy the site of the proposed nuclear repository at Gorleben.
- 1981: Riots in Brokdorf between 10,000 police and 100,000 anti-nuclear protesters.
- 1984: 4,000 anti-nuclear protesters blocked all access roads to Gorleben for 12 hours.
- 1986: 100,000 people demonstrated in the Bavarian village of Wackersdorf against a planned reprocessing plant.
- 1986: After the Chernobyl disaster, hundreds of thousands of people demonstrated against nuclear power in various locations.
- 1995: From the mid-1990s onwards, anti-nuclear protests were primarily directed against transports of radioactive waste called "castor" containers.
- 1996: Sit-ins against the second castor consignment bringing nuclear waste from La Hague in France to Gorleben.
- 1997: The third castor transport reached Gorleben despite the efforts of several thousand protesters.
- 2004: A 21-year-old man was killed during protests against the castor transport after a train severed his leg.
- 2008: 15,000 people protested against the eleventh castor transport.
- 2009: Tens of thousands demonstrated in Berlin under the motto "Turn Them Off", and called for the decommissioning of all nuclear facilities worldwide.
- 2010: 120,000 people formed a 120-kilometre long human chain between the nuclear power plants at Krummel and Brunsbuttel, to protest against the federal government's nuclear policy.
- 2011: Following the Fukushima nuclear disaster in March, regular quiet demonstrations (Mahnwachen) are held on each Monday in hundreds of places in Germany attracting each time more than 100,000 people. On 26 March, 250,000 people protest against nuclear energy in four cities (Berlin, Cologne, Hamburg and Munich). On 31 May, Chancellor Angela Merkel's coalition government announces a phase-out of Germany's nuclear industry by 2022.
- 2017: Germany demands that Tihange Nuclear Power Plant, in Belgium, be shut down.
- 2023: On 15 April 2023, last three nuclear power plants in Germany shut down.

== See also ==
=== Topics ===
- Anti-WAAhnsinns Festival
- Black bloc
- Brokdorf
- Bund für Umwelt und Naturschutz Deutschland
- Free Republic of Wendland
- Nuclear power in Germany
- Nuclear power phase-out
- Nuclear reprocessing plant Wackersdorf
- Renewable energy commercialization
- Renewable energy in Germany

=== Lists ===
- List of anti-nuclear advocates in Germany
- List of Nuclear-Free Future Award recipients
- List of anti-nuclear power groups
- List of books about nuclear issues
- List of Chernobyl-related articles
- List of nuclear whistleblowers
- Lists of nuclear disasters and radioactive incidents
