= Stade Nuclear Power Plant =

Nuclear power station in Germany

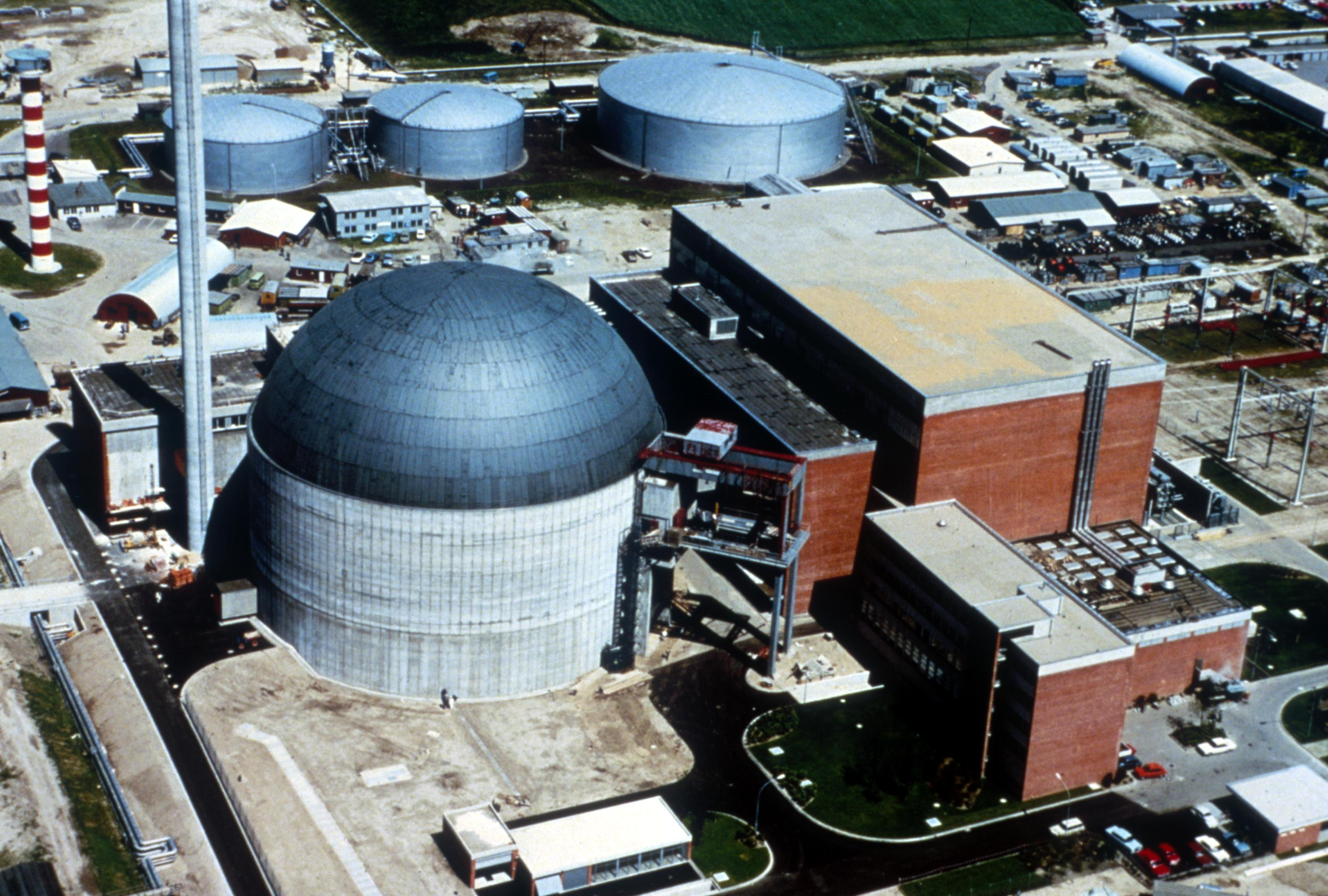
- Official name: Kernkraftwerk Stade
- Country: Germany
- Location: Bassenfleth
- Coordinates: 53°37′12″N 9°31′51″E
- Status: Closed, in Destruction
- Construction began: 1967
- Commission date: May 19, 1972
- Decommission date: November 14, 2003
- Owners: PreussenElektra (66.7%); Vattenfall Europe (33.3%)
- Operator: Kernkraftwerk Stade GmbH (PreussenElektra)

Nuclear power station
- Reactor type: PWR

Power generation
- Make and model: Siemens
- Units decommissioned: 1 × 672 MW
- Capacity factor: 76.1%
- Annual net output: 4481 GW·h

External links
- Website: Stade NPP
- Commons: Related media on Commons

Stade nuclear power plant (German: Kernkraftwerk Stade, KKS) operated from 1972 to 2003 in Bassenfleth close to the Schwinge river mouth into the Elbe river. It was the first nuclear plant shut down after Germany's nuclear phase out legislation and is currently being decommissioned (Phase 2: Deconstruction of larger modules in the containment building).

The station is on the left bank of the Elbe in Stadersand, a locality of Stade, to the west of Hamburg in Lower Saxony beside Schilling Power Station, which has also been shut down. It was a light water reactor.

== History ==
The power plant was built by Siemens and went online on May 19, 1972 shortly after having reached the first criticality on January 8, 1972. Between March, 1972 and November, 2003 the plant supplied electrical power of 662 MW (internal) / 630 MW (external), as well as 1,892 MW thermal power. Until September 7, 2005, the power plant ran in "post-operational" mode, and has been in "residual" mode since then.

In 31 years of operation, 157 fuel elements were consumed, including, from December 15, 1988 onwards, fuel elements containing 4% uranium. Starting in 1984, the nearby saltern was supplied with process steam. This was the first time a nuclear power station had supplied thermal energy. On Friday, November 14, 2003, at 8:32 a.m. the Stade nuclear power plant was shut down. E.ON, the company operating the plant at the time, cited economic reasons.

== Decommissioning ==
The power plant was decommissioned in five phases, which were expected to be completed by 2015.

- Phase 1: Decommissioning of machinery and parts not required for "residual" operation. Preparation of further steps and infrastructure.
- Phase 2: Decommissioning of large components in the containment building
- Phase 3: Decommissioning of the pressure containment building and the biological shield
- Phase 4: Decommissioning of remaining contaminated parts. Verification of absence of contamination. End of government nuclear supervision.
- Phase 5: Demolition of conventional structures.

On April 27, 2005 the last fuel cells were removed from the plant. The Department of the Environment of Lower Saxony authorized the storage of weak nuclear waste until 2046.

== Consequences ==
After shutdown of the Stade nuclear power plant, the operation of the nearby saltern has been shut down also.

Meanwhile it is planned to construct a black coal power plant with almost the same power as the KKS. This requires extension of the harbour of Stade-Bützfleth with a coal terminal for 1.7 million t black coal.

== See also ==
- Anti-nuclear movement in Germany
- Germany's nuclear phase out legislation
