= Gundremmingen Nuclear Power Plant =

Nuclear power plant in Germany

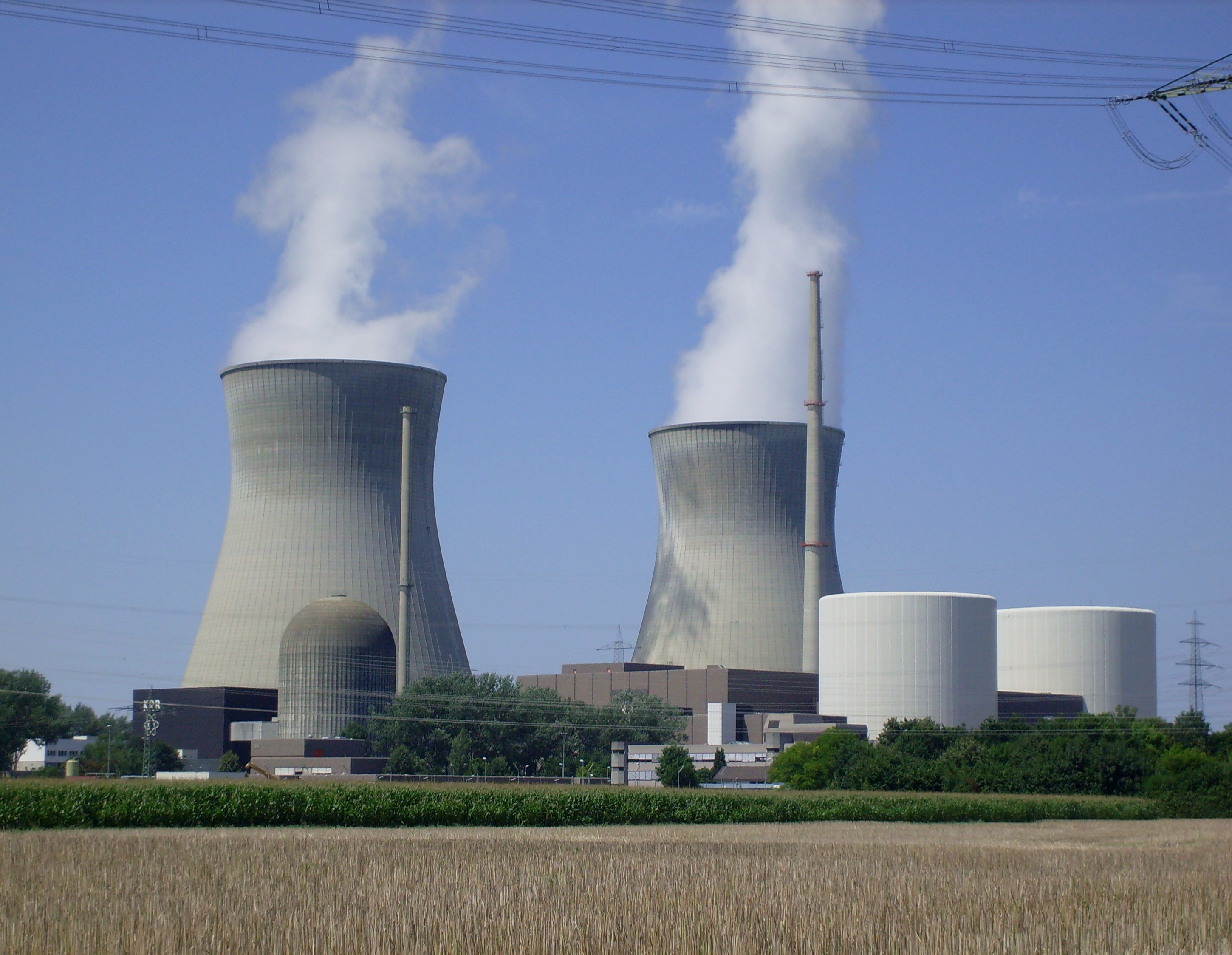
- Gundremmingen Nuclear Power Plant: Unit A (left foreground), Units B and C (right) and their cooling towers (rear)
- Country: Germany
- Location: Gundremmingen, district of Günzburg, Bavaria
- Coordinates: 48°30′53″N 10°24′8″E
- Status: Decommissioning
- Construction began: 1962
- Commission date: 12 April 1967
- Decommission date: 31 December 2021
- Owners: 75% RWE; 25% PreussenElektra
- Operators: Kernkraftwerk; Gundremmingen GmbH

Nuclear power station
- Reactor type: BWR
- Cooling towers: 2 × Natural Draft
- Cooling source: Danube River

Power generation
- Units operational: 1 × 1284 MW
- Units decommissioned: 1 × 250 MW
- Nameplate capacity: 2572 MW
- Capacity factor: 81.83%
- Annual net output: 18,436 GW·h (2016)

External links
- Website: www.kkw-gundremmingen.de
- Commons: Related media on Commons

The Gundremmingen Nuclear Power Plant was a nuclear power station in Germany. It was located in Gundremmingen, district of Günzburg, Bavaria. It was operated by Kernkraftwerk Gundremmingen GmbH, a joint operation of RWE Power AG (75%) and PreussenElektra (25%). Unit B was shut down at the end of 2017. Unit C, the last boiling water reactor in Germany, was shut down on New Year's Eve 2021, as part of the German nuclear phase out. However, Gundremmingen unit C as well as the other two German nuclear reactors shut down that day (Brokdorf and Grohnde) remained capable of restarting operations in March 2022.

In November 1975, Unit A was the site of the first fatal accident in a nuclear power plant in Germany, though the accident was unrelated to radiation. After a later major incident in 1977, Unit A was never returned to service.

The reinforced concrete structure of the cooling towers was dismantled with explosives on 25 October 2025. The decommissioning of the remaining structures is expected to be finished by 2040. RWE is reusing the site as the location of a 400 MW / 700 MWh battery storage facility.

== Reactor units ==
=== Unit A ===
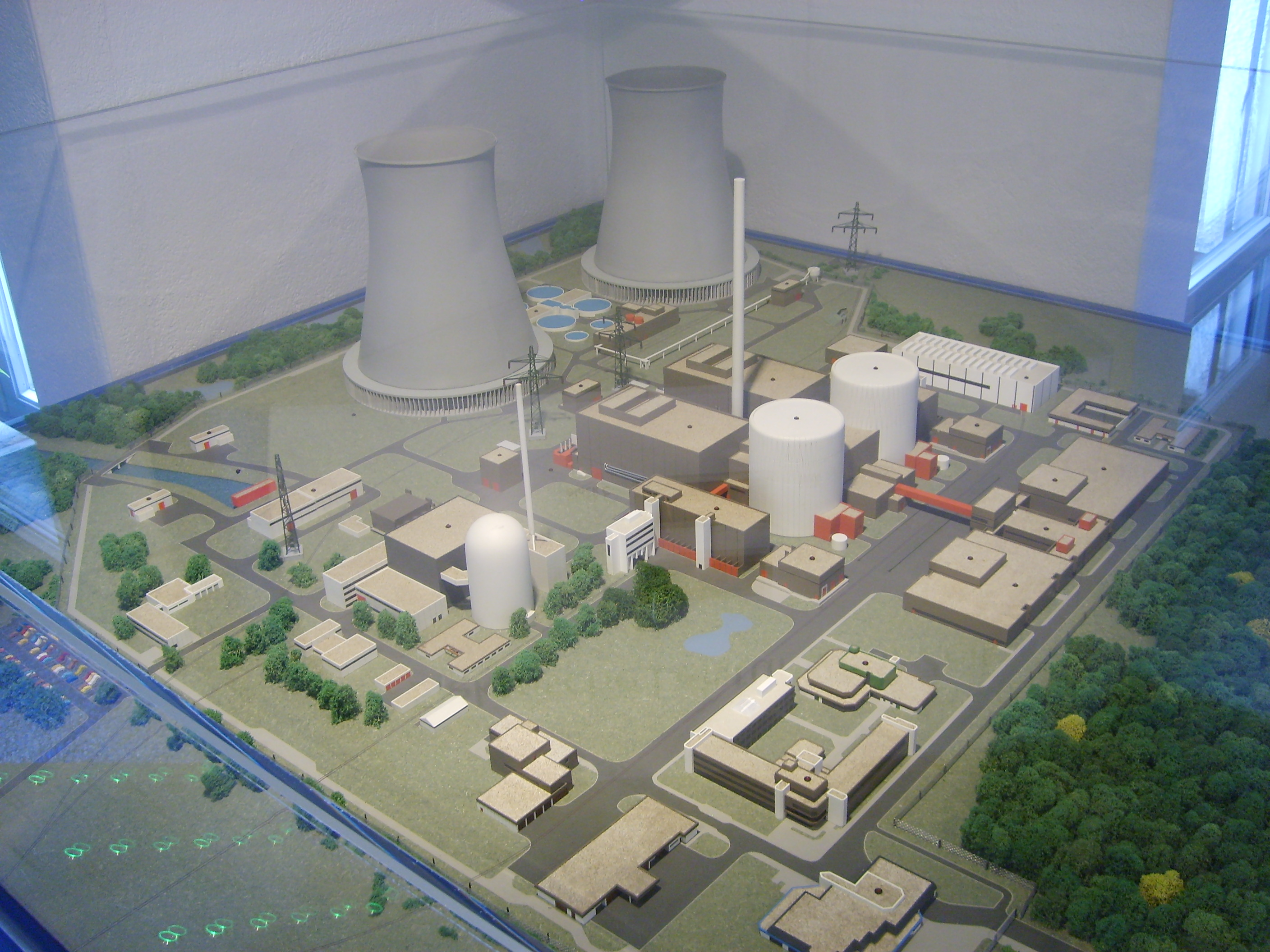
Scale model of the Gundremmingen plant, in the information center

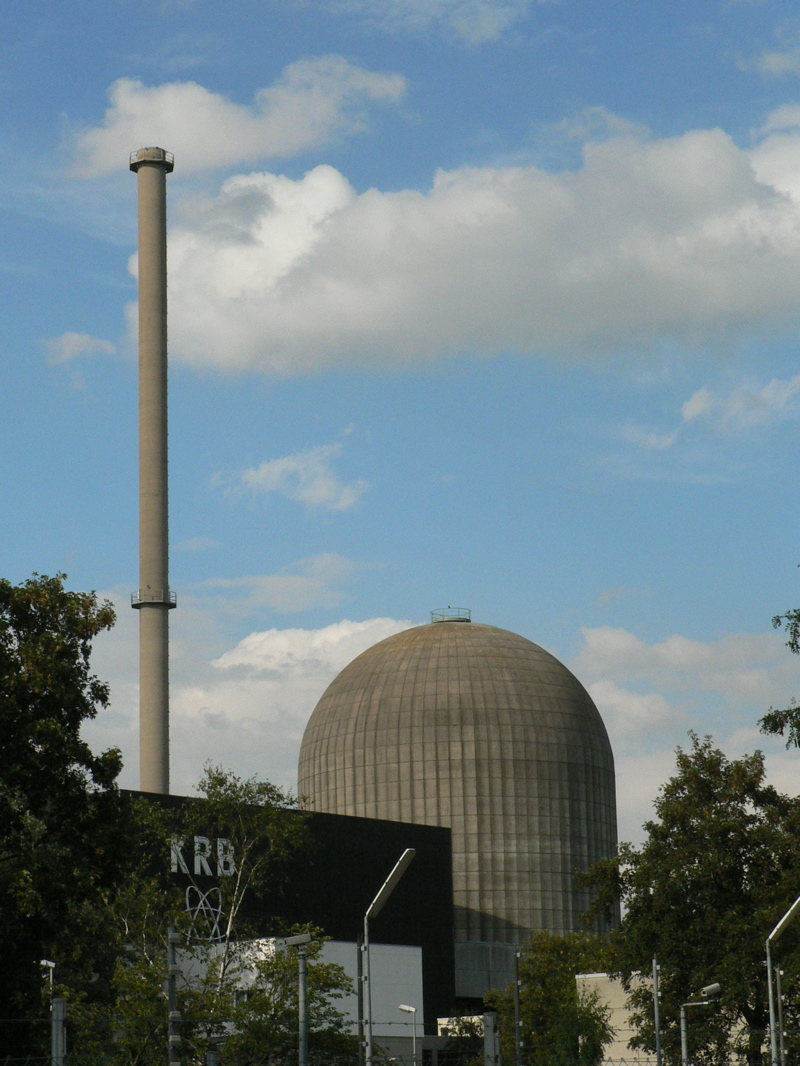
The damaged Unit A

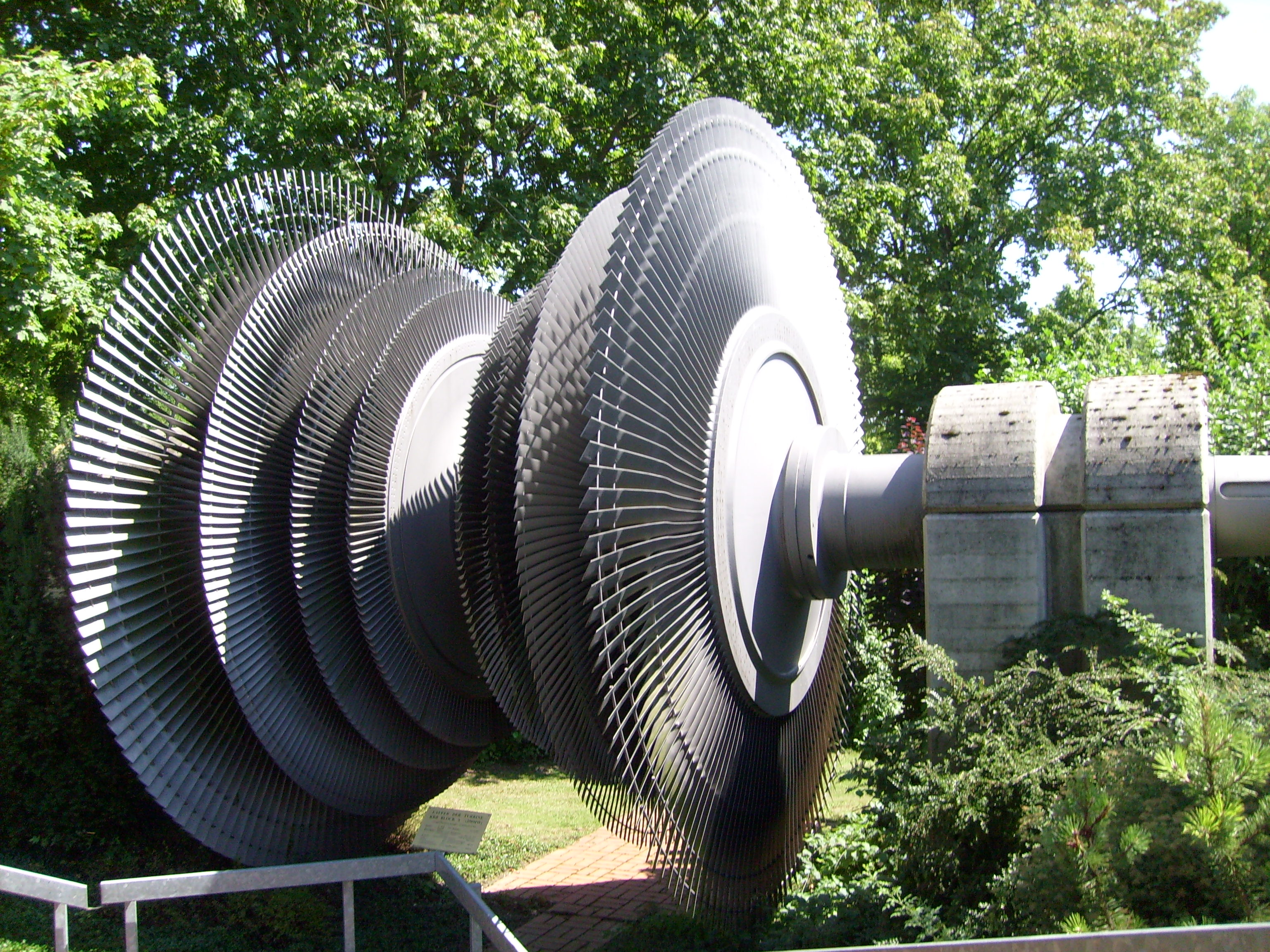
Retired turbine from Unit A in front of plant information center

Unit A was a boiling water reactor with an output of 237 megawatts, the first large nuclear power plant in Germany. It was in operation from December 1966 until January 1977, and generated a total of 13.79 TWh of energy during those years.

Following objections by the city of Nuremberg to the original planned location on the Danube at Bertoldsheim (between Donauwörth und Neuburg an der Donau), because of protected areas for the city's drinking water supply in the Lech estuary, the plant was instead located approximately 50 km up-river in Gundremmingen, between Dillingen an der Donau and Günzburg. The plant was proposed on 13 July 1962, quickly approved, on 14 December 1962, and placed in service in December 1966. A protest group, the Notgemeinschaft Atom-Kraftwerk Gundremmingen-Offingen (Gundremmingen-Offingen Atomic Power Plant Emergency Organization) was silenced using monies specifically set aside for the purpose.

In 1975 an incident occurred in which two workers were killed by escaping steam: it was the first fatal accident in a nuclear power plant in Germany.

On 13 January 1977 a serious incident occurred that resulted in the total loss of Unit A. In cold, damp weather, two high-voltage lines carrying electricity from the plant short-circuited. The ensuing rapid shutdown of the reactor led to operational errors. Within ten minutes, there was approximately 3 meters of standing water in the reactor building and the temperature had risen to nearly 80 degrees Celsius. Through error, too much water was introduced into the reactor for emergency cooling. Pressure relief valves released between 200 and 400 cubic meters (sources vary) of radioactive coolant water into the building. The water, and also the gases, were later released from the building into the environment.

Political and regulatory bodies required that in addition to repairs, the unit's control and safety systems be modernized. Because modernization would have required an investment of 180 million DM, and since Units B and C were already under construction, the operating authorities later decided not to return Unit A to service. The contaminated steel parts were contained in protective castings and removed to the interim radioactive storage location in Mitterteich.

In 1983 the decision was made to dismantle the unit. Dismantling was "far advanced" in 2005 and has led to valuable experience and the development of state of the art processes for the breakdown, handling, and cleansing of radiation-contaminated materials. According to the operators, approximately 10,000 tonnes of scrap have been created in the process, of which 86% have been re-usable and 14% are to be disposed of in permanent storage as radioactive waste.

In January 2006 the Bayerisches Staatsministerium für Umwelt, Gesundheit und Verbraucherschutz (Bavarian State Ministry for Environment, Health, and Consumer Safety) gave permission for the construction of a "technology center" within the confines of the former Unit A - with the exception of the reactor building. Following conversion and modernization, the following work will be possible there:

- Treatment of remaining radioactive material with the objective of re-use
- Mitigation of radioactive wastes
- Servicing of components
- Manufacture and storage until use of tools and equipment
- Storage and preparation for transportation of treated and untreated wastes pending their conversion or removal from the site.

The statement of permission also allows venting of radioactive materials via the exhaust stacks. Maximum permitted annual radioactive emissions are: 50 MBq for aerosol radionuclides with half-lives greater than 8 days (excluding iodine-131), 0.5 Mbq for iodine-131, and 100,000 MBq for tritium.

=== Units B and C ===
Units B and C are neighboring units of identical construction. Each consists of a reactor building, a machine shed, and a 160 m tall cooling tower. The two units share a 170 m tall exhaust stack. Construction of Units B and C commenced on 19 July 1976. Unit B was completed on 9 March 1984, Unit C on 26 October 1984. Both reactors are designated Series 72 (for 1972, the year in which they were initially conceived).

Each reactor is loaded with around 136 tonnes of fuel; the reaction elements last approximately five years. Annually, roughly a fifth of them are switched out. Water is drawn from the river via a canal 1.4 km in length; it condenses in the cooling towers at a rate of 0.7 cubic meters per second. It is returned to the river through an underground pipe.

Units B and C are, like unit A, boiling water reactors. In this type of reactor, the water flows around the fuel elements, boils, and the steam directly drives the turbines. Thus, in boiling water reactors, in contrast to pressurized water reactors, there is only a single, primary coolant loop. Each unit is loaded with 784 fuel elements. One fuel element contains approximately 174 kg uranium and consists of 100 (i.e. 10 x 10) fuel rods. Units B and C together generated a total of approximately 21,000,000,000 kWh of electricity annually. They supplied approximately 30% of Bavaria's electricity.

Net electrical output was 1,284 megawatts for Unit B, and 1,288 megawatts for Unit C. An increase in the output of Units B and C from a gross electrical output of 1,344 megawatts each to 1,450 megawatts was requested in September 1999 but has been suspended for years. On 19 December 2007, the Bayerisches Umweltministerium (Bavarian Ministry of the Environment) mandated an increase in performance of 160 thermal megawatts and in electricity generation of 52 megawatts. In addition, in recent years there has been a plan to convert both units to load management operation, in which the electrical output ("load") is managed. On weekends, at least, these reactors are often throttled back.

At the end of 1994, the operators announced agreements with the nuclear reprocessing plants at La Hague, France and Sellafield, England, and with that opted for long-term interim storage.

In 1995, plutonium-containing mixed oxide fuel elements (MOX fuel) were for the first time used on a large scale in boiling water reactors. Their increased radiation has been repeatedly criticized by environmental protection groups, which have registered around 40,000 protests. Utilization of these fuel elements enables more effective use of available uranium through reprocessing. The operators must guarantee that the reactor can be safely shut down under all operating conditions. And at least once every operating period and upon every alteration to the fuel load in the core, a report on the so-called shut-down reactivity must be submitted, as required by German safety rule KTA 3104.

Measured emitted radioactivity in 2004 was 3 TBq airborne and 5 TBq waterborne.

The shutdown of the Gundremmingen B reactor took place at the end of 2017; Gundremmingen C was shut down at the end of 2021.

== Interim storage of spent nuclear fuel ==
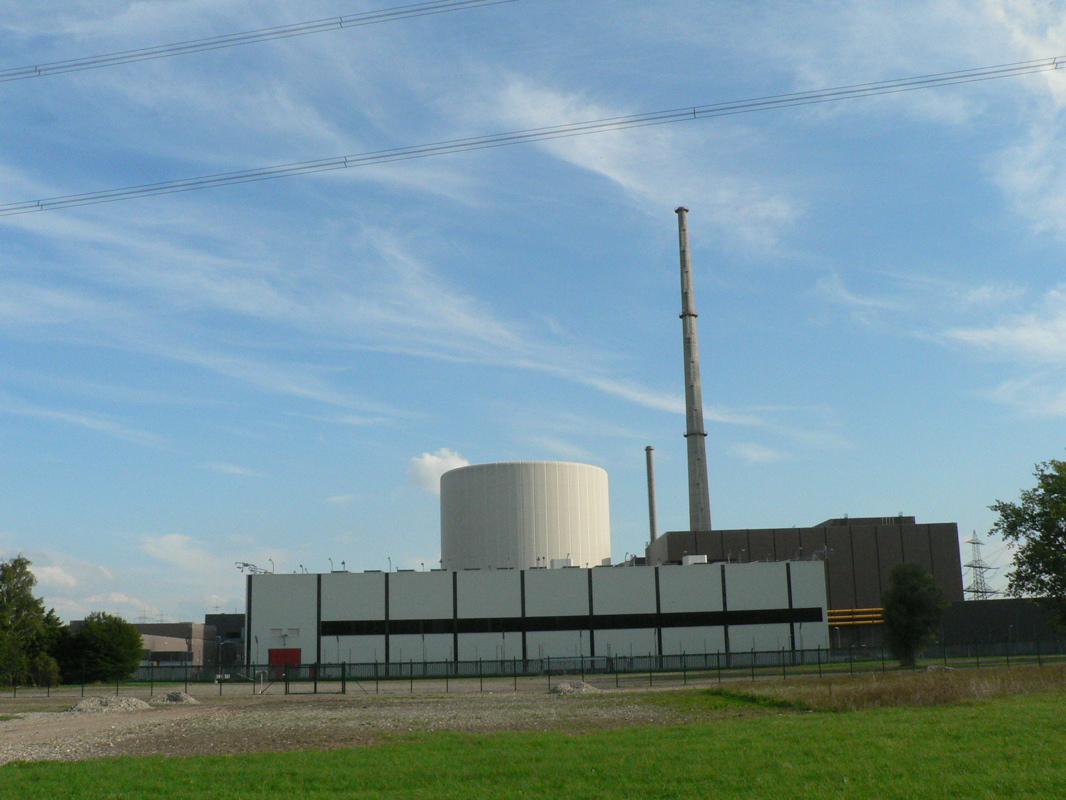
Interim storage for spent nuclear fuel (white building in foreground)

Since August 2004, an interim storage facility has been established on the grounds of the nuclear power plant for spent fuel elements with a heavy metal weight of 2,250 tonnes. It contains 192 storage spaces and was placed in operation in 2006. € 30 million have been budgeted for this. Construction of the building (104 m long, 38 m wide, and 18 m tall) was completed at the end of 2005. After interior fitting with electrical, heating, and ventilation equipment, installation of heavyweight hoists, and remaining exterior work, on 25 August 2006 the interim storage facility was opened and the first containers from the power plant moved in.

To minimize risk of radiation, the facility has two doors each weighing 50 tonnes and thick concrete walls, although at 85 cm they are thinner than in comparable storage facilities in North Germany (e.g. at Brokdorf 120 cm). At 55 cm, the concrete roof is likewise considerably weaker than the roofs of the interim storage facilities built in North Germany (e.g. Brokdorf 130 cm).

The power station operators had submitted a request to store up to 192 containers of spent nuclear fuel. With the assistance of environmental groups, neighboring residents lodged a legal complaint against the project. In a judgment dated 2 January 2006, the Bavarian Administrative Court rejected these complaints. An appeal was not accepted. The plaintiffs protested this decision with a complaint of non-admission to the Federal Administrative Court in Leipzig. On 24 August 2006, this motion was rejected. In addition to concern about catastrophic accidents in particular terrorist attacks, the opposition was motivated by fear that the interim storage facility might develop into an unplanned permanent storage facility, since even in 2005, despite many assurances, there still existed no permanent depository anywhere in the world for spent nuclear fuel, which requires safe containment for thousands of years.

== Weather tower ==
Since 1978, approximately one kilometer east of the nuclear power station, at 48°30'47" N, 10°25'13" E, has been the location of a 174 m tall steel and concrete tower with instruments for monitoring climatic conditions, known as the Meteo-Turm or Weather Tower. This tower also houses a ham radio digipeater with callsign DB0DLG for packet radio.

== Reactor data ==
The Gundremmingen Nuclear Power Plant has a total of three units:

| Unit | Reactor type | Net capacity | Gross capacity | Construction started | Electricity Grid | Commercial Operation | Shutdown |
|---|---|---|---|---|---|---|---|
| Gundremmingen A | boiling water reactor | 237 MW | 250 MW | 12 December 1962 | 12 January 1966 | 4 December 1967 | 13 January 1977 |
| Gundremmingen B | boiling water reactor | 1284 MW | 1344 MW | 20 July 1976 | 16 March 1984 | 19 July 1984 | 31 December 2017 |
| Gundremmingen C | boiling water reactor | 1288 MW | 1344 MW | 20 July 1976 | 11 February 1984 | 18 January 1985 | 31 December 2021 |

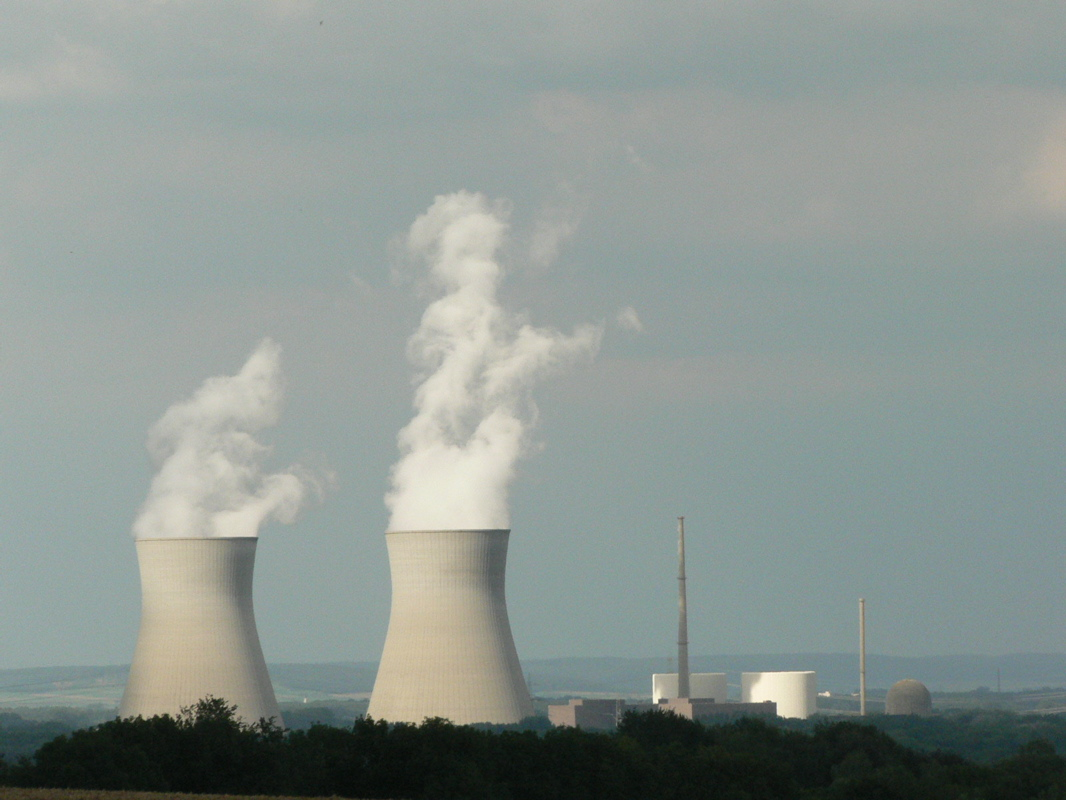
The nuclear power plant

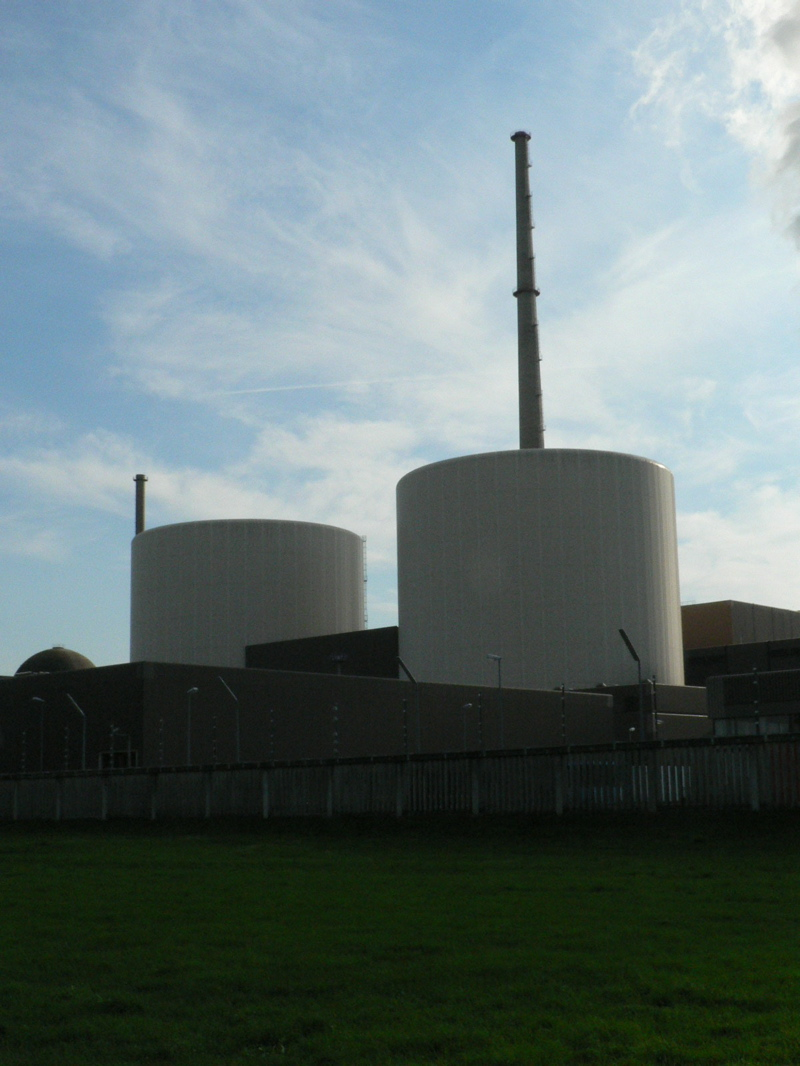
Units B and C

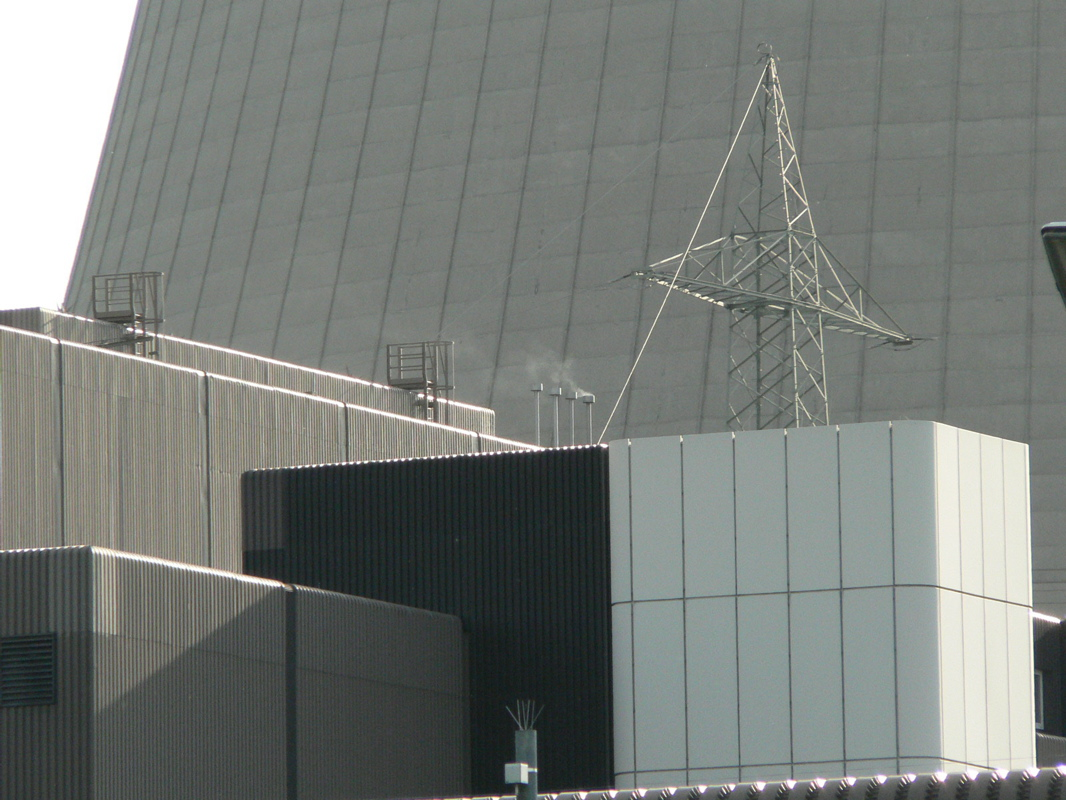
Close-up view showing steam venting
