= Unterweser Nuclear Power Plant =

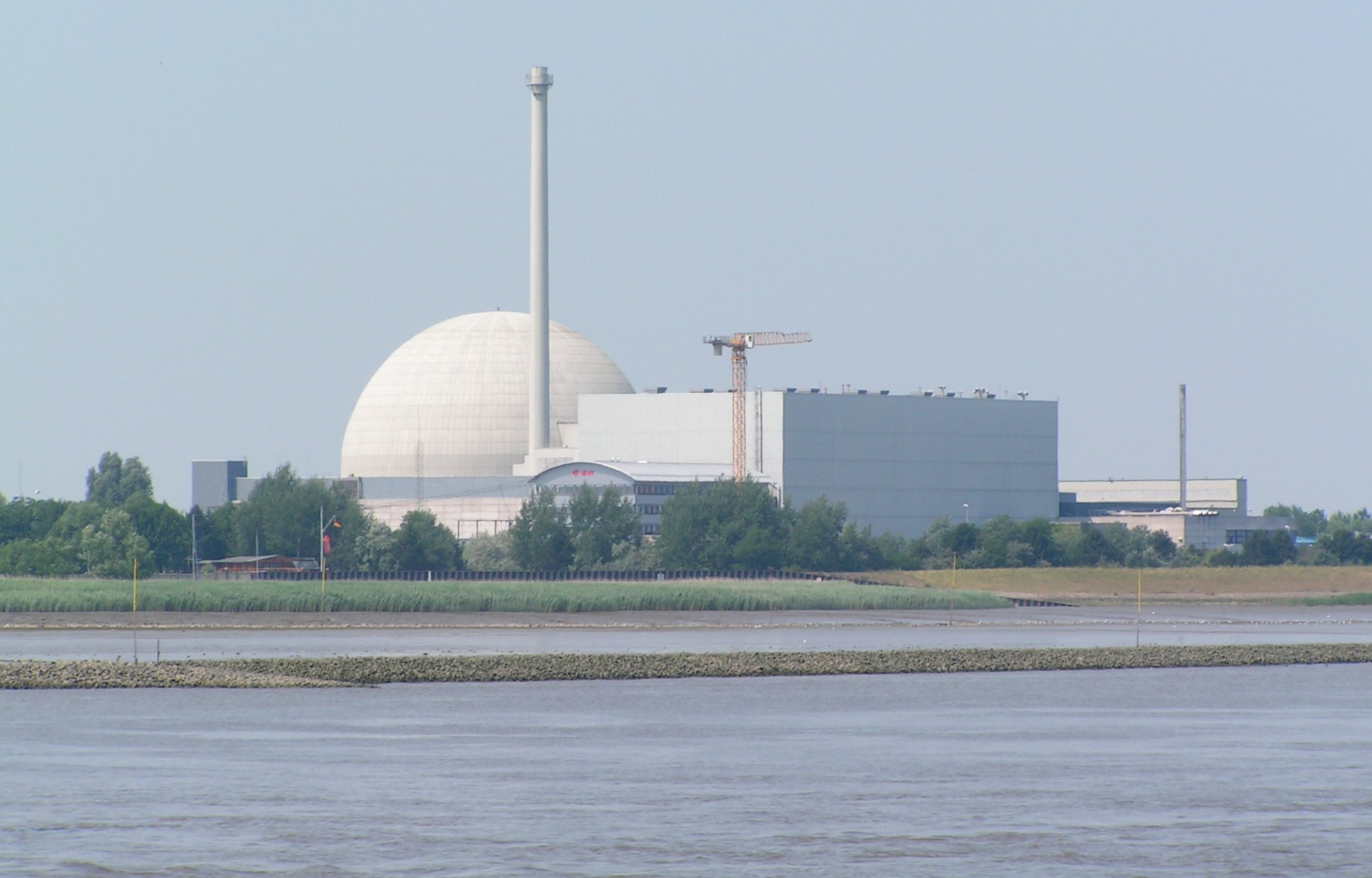
- Country: Germany
- Coordinates: 53°25′39.72″N 8°28′48.71″E
- Status: Being decommissioned
- Construction began: July 1, 1972
- Commission date: September 29, 1978
- Decommission date: 6 August 2011
- Owner: PreussenElektra
- Operators: E.ON; PreussenElektra

Nuclear power station
- Reactor type: PWR
- Cooling source: Weser River

Power generation
- Units operational: 1 × 1,410 MW
- Nameplate capacity: 1,410 MW
- Capacity factor: 72.0%
- Annual net output: 8,891 GW·h

External links
- Website: Official site
- Commons: Related media on Commons

Unterweser nuclear power station is an inactive nuclear power plant in Kleinensiel (Stadland municipality), near Nordenham, Lower Saxony, Germany. It consists of a single reactor with a nameplate capacity of 1410MW_{e}, which operated from 1979 until 2011.

== History ==
Construction began on 1 July 1972, and the power plant was commissioned on 29 September 1978. At the time of the reactor's commissioning, it was the largest nuclear reactor in the world. It had 193 fuel assemblies.

Unterweser was one of the seven reactors shut down on 17 March 2011 (although actual shutdown was several days later, as the nuclear fuel rods take time to cool down) pending the results of a three-month moratorium on nuclear power. On 30 May 2011, the German government announced that Unterweser would not be returning to operation following the moratorium and would be decommissioned. The final fuel rods were removed in February 2019.

== Gallery ==
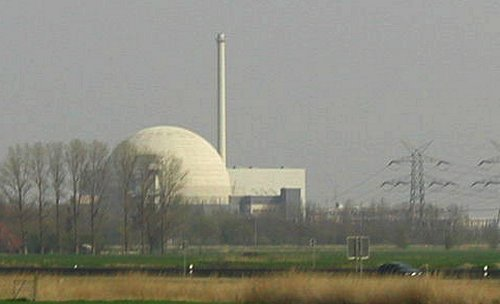
The Unterweser Nuclear Power Plant

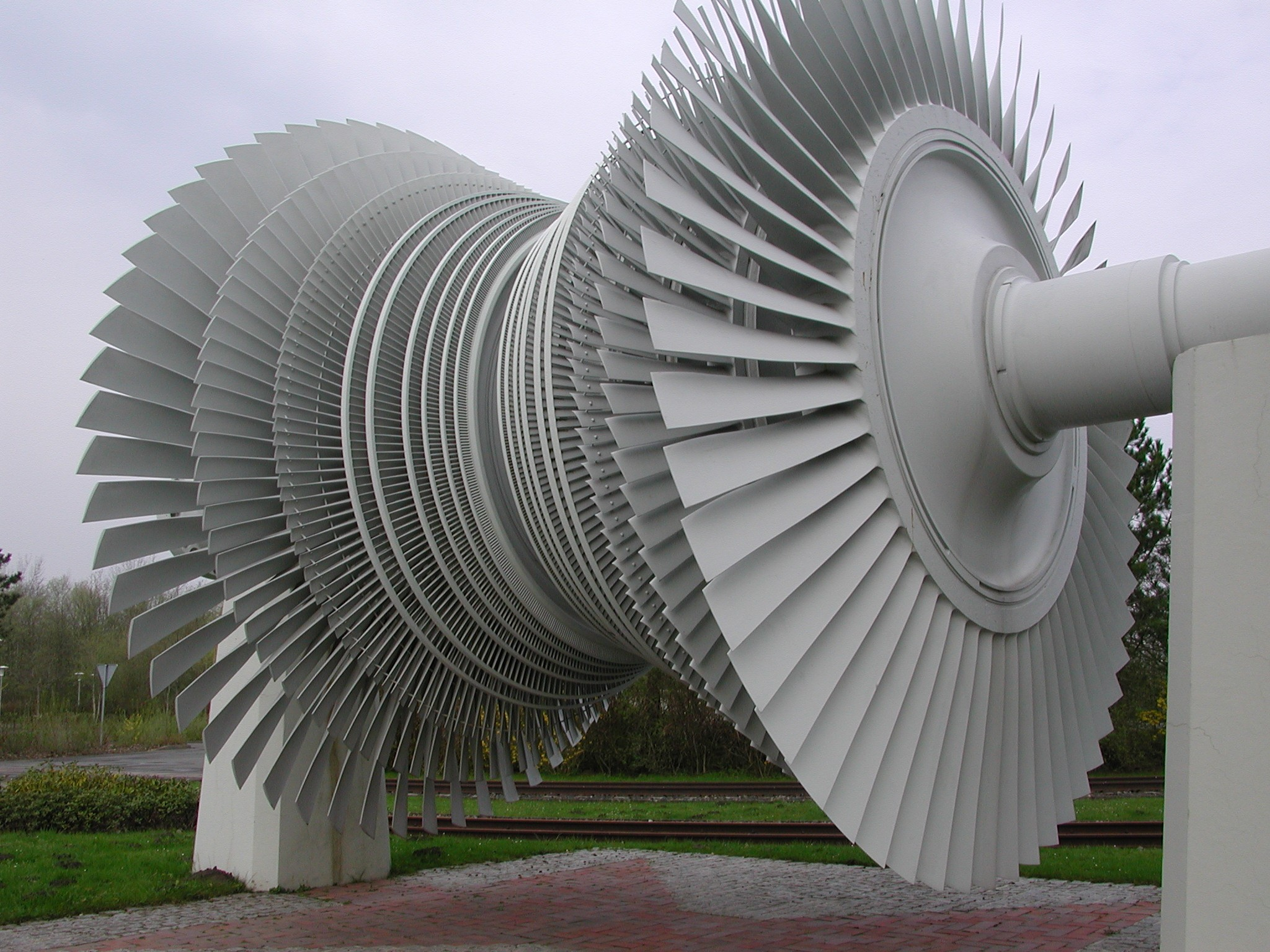
Low-pressure turbine rotor
