= Grohnde Nuclear Power Plant =

Former nuclear power plant in Gronhde, Lower Saxony

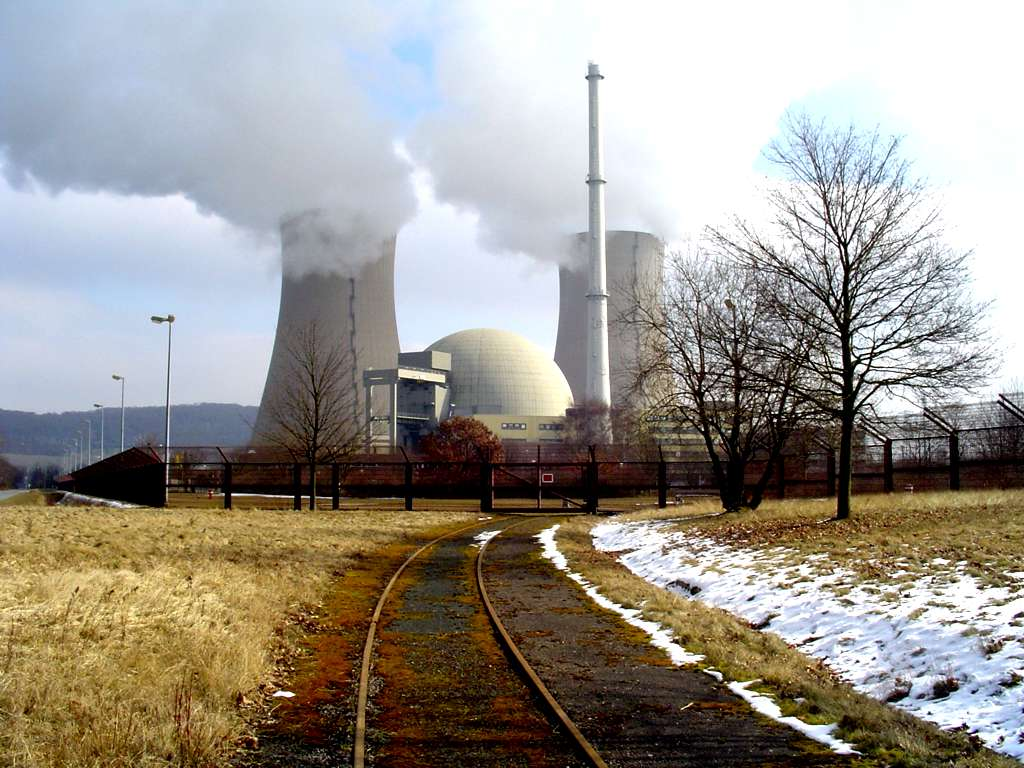
- Country: Germany
- Coordinates: 52°02′07″N 9°24′48″E
- Status: Decommissioned
- Construction began: 1975
- Commission date: 4 September 1984
- Decommission date: 31 December 2021
- Owners: 83.3% PreussenElektra; 16.7% Stadtwerke Bielefeld
- Operator: GKKG Grohnde (PreussenElektra)

Nuclear power station
- Reactor type: PWR
- Cooling towers: 2
- Cooling source: Weser River

Power generation
- Units operational: 1 x 1,430 MW
- Nameplate capacity: 1,430 MW
- Capacity factor: 87.8%
- Annual net output: 10,996 GW·h

External links
- Website: www.preussenelektra.de/de/unsere-kraftwerke/kraftwerkgrohnde.html
- Commons: Related media on Commons

The former Grohnde Nuclear Power Plant is a nuclear power plant located in Grohnde in the Hamelin-Pyrmont district of Lower Saxony, Germany. Its single reactor has a nameplate capacity of 1430MW_{e} and it was in operation from 1985 through 2021.

== Location ==
The power plant is located in Emmerthal Municipality, approximately 8 km south of the town of Hamelin in southern Lower Saxony. Its namesake, the village of Grohnde, is located 2 km south of the facility. It sits at an elevation of 72 m above sea level in the Weser valley.

The closest village aside from Grohnde is Latferde, located 1.8 km away on the opposite bank of the Weser river; the immediate vicinity of the power plant within a radius of 1 km is uninhabited. The closest large city is Hanover, located 50 km from the power plant.

The power plant's location does not experience any significant seismic activity; as such the facility is considered to be earthquake-proof.

The power plant is well-connected to road and railway links: the B83 runs to the west of the facility and the nearby Hanover-Altenbeken railway can be reached from the power plant from a branch line.

== Basic information ==
The nuclear power plant has a gross capacity of 1430MWe and a net power output of 1360MWe. The plant's net output is the actual power delivered to the grid after subtracting the energy used by the reactor's own systems, such as the coolant pumps. The reactor has a thermal power output of 3900 megawatts.

The plant's reactor is of the pressurized water reactor type, using four water based coolant cycles, kept under high pressure. The design used for the plant's reactor is the Vor-Konvoi design, which was developed by Kraftwerk Union in the 1970s and used in several other power plants, such as the Brokdorf, Grafenrheinfeld and Philippsburg-2 power plants in Germany, as well as the Angra-2 power plant in Brazil.

The reactor used 193 fuel assemblies and utilized both enriched uranium and MOX fuel. In 1985, 1986, 1987, 1989, 1990 and 1998 the reactor produced more net electricity for the respective year than any other nuclear reactor in the world.

The power plant is equipped with a 130-metre high chimney used to vent reactor gases, the radioactivity of which was monitored and tightly controlled. Additionally, two 146-metre tall natural draft cooling towers, fed by water from the Weser river, were used to condense the steam in the low-pressure reactor cooling loop.

The electricity produced by the power plant was fed into the 380kV high-voltage transmission network operated by Tennet TSO.

== History ==
Construction of the plant began in 1975. The plant was built by PreussenElektra and Gemeinschaftskraftwerk Weser GmbH, with each company having a 50% share in the project.

Construction was completed in 1984 and the reactor reached first criticality the same year. Commercial electricity generation began on February 1st, 1985.

In 2003, ownership of the plant was transferred to E.ON Energie AG and Stadtwerke Bielefeld.

In 2021 the plant's reactor exceeded 400 TWh of total low-carbon electricity output since it was connected to the grid, being the first nuclear reactor in the world to reach this milestone. As such, during its period of operation, the plant has prevented 400 million tons of CO_{2} emissions. In theory, the electricity produced by the plant during its lifetime could have powered the entirety of Germany for almost a year.

The plant ceased power operation on 31 December 2021 as part of Germany's phaseout of nuclear power.

The plant is currently undergoing decommissioning, which is expected to be completed around 2036.

== Gallery ==
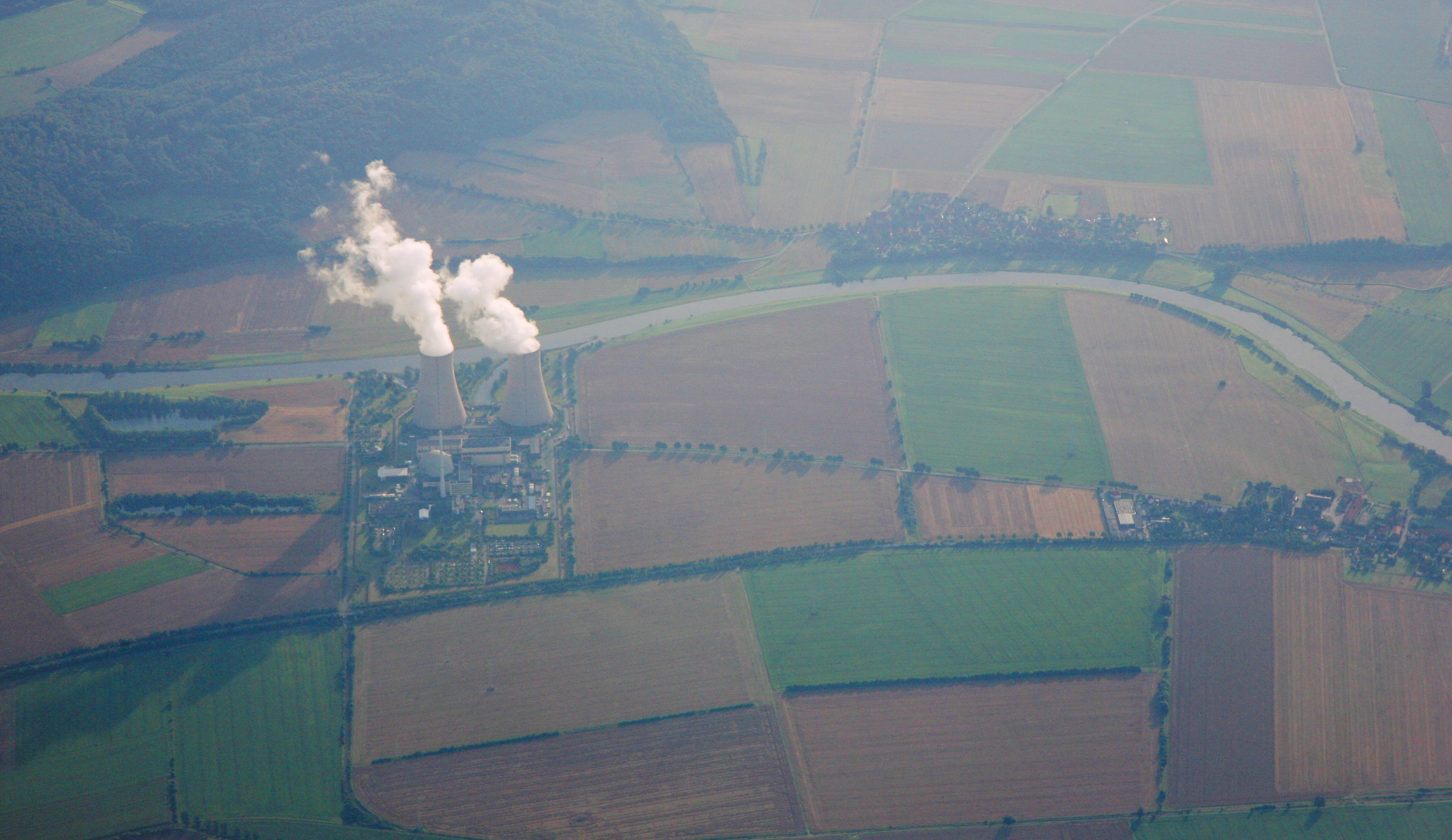
Aerial view of Grohnde nuclear power plant on the Weser river, the village of Grohnde is visible to the right.

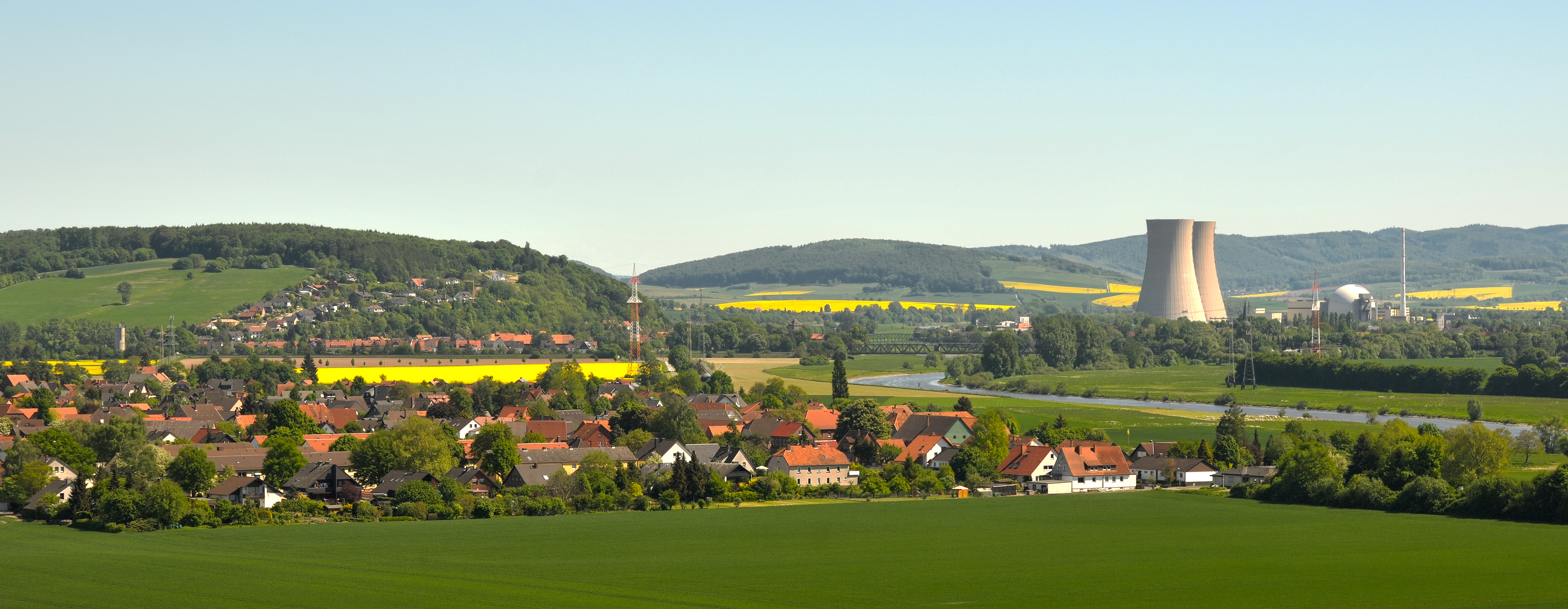
View from the Ohrbergpark of the small village of Tündern and of the Grohnde Nuclear Power Plant beside the river Weser in the Upper Weser Valley and the Weser Uplands. The yellow fields are rapeseed fields.

== See also ==
- Nuclear power in Germany
