= Brokdorf =

- Municipality
- Coat of arms

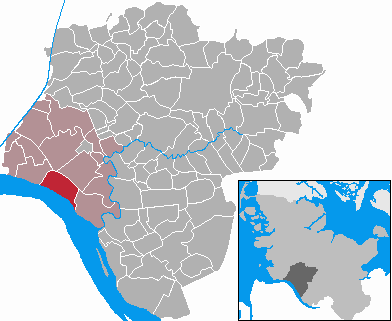
- Location of Brokdorf within Steinburg district
- Interactive map of Brokdorf
- Location within Germany Location within Schleswig-Holstein
- Coordinates: 53°51′41″N 9°19′49″E
- Country: Germany
- State: Schleswig-Holstein
- District: Steinburg
- Municipal assoc.: Wilstermarsch

Government
  - Mayor: Elke Göttsche (CDU)

Area
  - Total: 19.79 km^{2} (7.64 sq mi)
- Elevation: 1 m (3.3 ft)

Population (2025-12-31)
  - Total: 997
  - Density: 50.4/km^{2} (130/sq mi)
- Time zone: UTC+01:00 (CET)
  - Summer (DST): UTC+02:00 (CEST)
- Postal codes: 25576
- Dialling codes: 04829, 04858
- Vehicle registration: IZ
- Website: www.wilstermarsch.de

Brokdorf is a municipality in the district of Steinburg, in Schleswig-Holstein, Germany. It is located on the bank of the Elbe river, approx. 20 km east before the river flows into the North Sea. As of December 2019, the total population of Brokdorf was 965 residents.

== History ==
=== Nuclear reactor project ===
The planning for a light-water nuclear power reactor at Brokdorf, 45 miles northwest of Hamburg, began in the late 1960s, and concerns about the Brokdorf Nuclear Power Plant proposal became a public issue in November 1973, when several nuclear power reactors were already operating in Germany. During construction in the 1970s and 1980s there were violent protests about Brokdorf by opponents. The largest onsite demonstrations were in November 1976, February 1977, January 1981 and June 1986.

In November 1976, more than 30,000 people demonstrated against the Brokdorf project. These protests led to a construction stop in October 1977, which was formally justified by the lack of a disposal strategy for spent fuel. Brokdorf had become a powerful symbol of the German anti-nuclear movement.

February 1977, 6,500 riot police and 2,000 border guard officers were mobilized from across the Federal Republic of Germany. Altogether, over 1,000 vehicles, including water cannons, armored cars and other, were used by the authorities in Brokdorf. Roadblocks were erected throughout Germany, and people entering through the Danish and Dutch border were questioned in regards to their intentions.

When construction was about to resume in February 1981, about 100,000 people demonstrated against the project, confronting a police contingent of more than 10,000. At the time, this was the biggest police operation in West German history. More confrontations and political wrangling followed, but the Brokdorf nuclear power reactor eventually started operation in October 1986.

== See also ==
- Wyhl
- Kalkar
