= Brunsbüttel Nuclear Power Plant =

Nuclear power plant in Germany

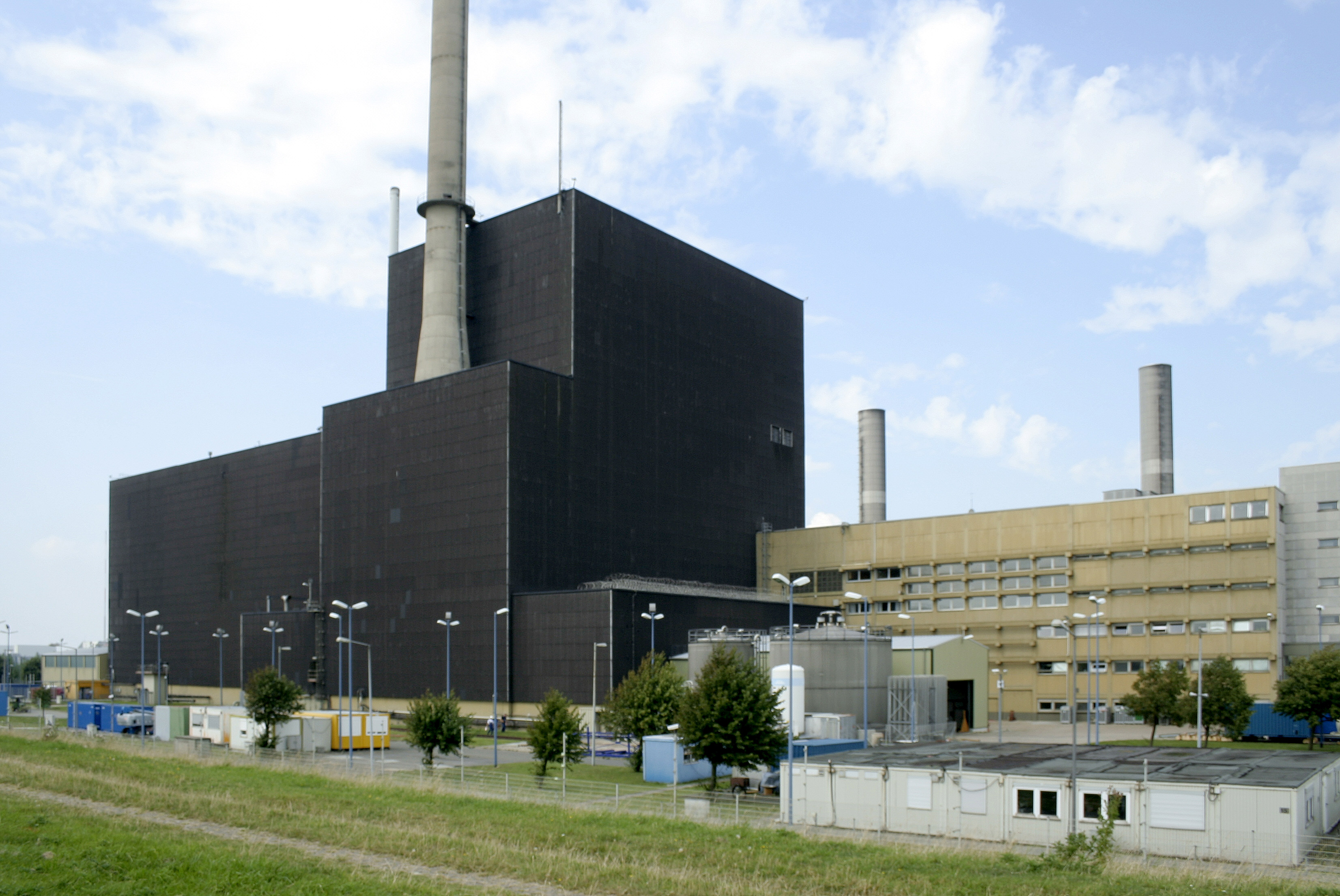
- Country: Germany
- Location: Brunsbüttel, Schleswig-Holstein
- Coordinates: 53°53′30″N 9°12′06″E
- Status: Partially demolished
- Construction began: 1969
- Commission date: July 13, 1976
- Decommission date: 2007
- Owners: Vattenfall (67%); PreussenElektra (33%)
- Operator: KKW Brunsbüttel

Nuclear power station
- Reactor type: BWR
- Reactor supplier: Siemens

Power generation
- Units operational: 1 × 806 MW
- Make and model: Siemens
- Nameplate capacity: 806 MW
- Capacity factor: 64.1%
- Annual net output: 4527 GW·h

External links
- Website: www.eon-kernkraft.com/frameset_german/nuclear-power-plant/nuclear-power-plant_locations/energy_nuclearpower_kkbrunsbuettel.jsp
- Commons: Related media on Commons

The Brunsbüttel Nuclear Power Plant is a nuclear power plant in Brunsbüttel near Hamburg, Germany. It is owned 67% by Vattenfall and 33% by E.ON. It started operation in 1976 and has a gross power production of 806 MW. During its lifetime, it produced 130,000 GW hours of electricity. The value of this electricity is about 9.1 billion Euros before calculation of the nuclear waste management.

As part of the nuclear power phase-out, it was taken out of service in 2011. It had been idle since 2007.
