= Brokdorf Nuclear Power Plant =

Nuclear power plant in Germany

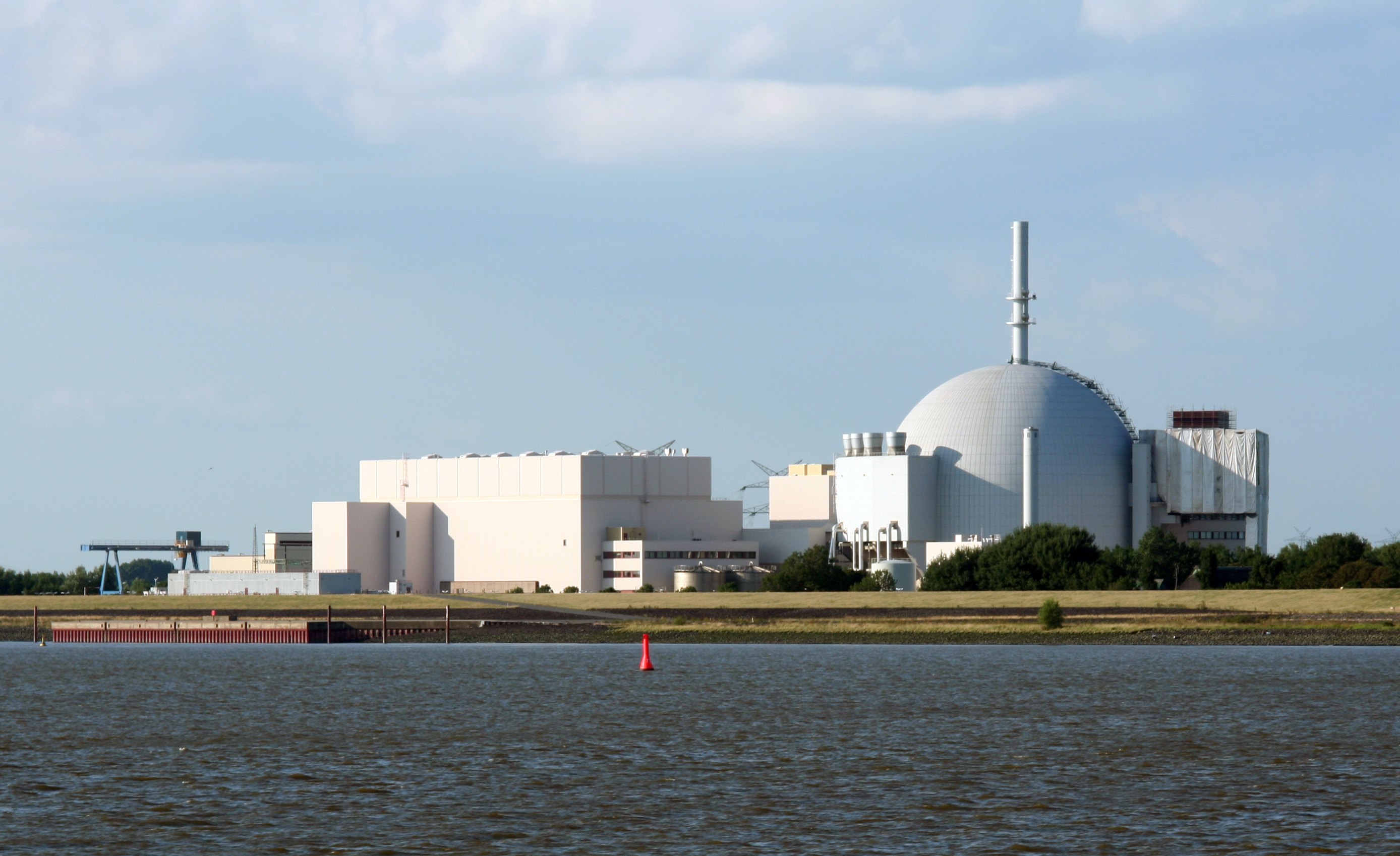
- Country: Germany
- Location: Brokdorf, Steinburg
- Coordinates: 53°51′03″N 9°20′41″E
- Status: Decommissioned
- Construction began: 1975
- Commission date: 14 October 1986
- Decommission date: 31 December 2021
- Owners: PreussenElektra (80%); Vattenfall Europe (20%)
- Operator: PreussenElektra

Nuclear power station
- Reactor type: PWR
- Reactor supplier: Siemens
- Cooling source: Elbe River

Power generation
- Units operational: 1 x 1,440 MW
- Make and model: Siemens
- Nameplate capacity: 1,440 MW
- Capacity factor: 90.8%
- Annual net output: 11,459 GW·h

External links
- Website: www.preussenelektra.de/en/our-powerplants/kraftwerkbrokdorf.html
- Commons: Related media on Commons

Brokdorf Nuclear Power Plant (German: Kernkraftwerk Brokdorf, or KBR) is a nuclear power plant near the municipality of Brokdorf in Steinburg, Schleswig-Holstein, Germany. It has a single reactor with a nameplate capacity of 1440MW_{e}. The plant began operations in October 1986, and was decommissioned on December 31st, 2021 as part of the German phaseout of nuclear power.

== History ==
Construction began in 1975, and the power plant was commissioned on October 14, 1986. The plant was built by a first-of-its-kind joint venture between PreussenElektra AG and Hamburgische Electricitäts-Werke, since 2002 part of Vattenfall. During the construction phase in the 1970s and 1980s there were violent protests against nuclear power at the location.

In May 2021, the 1,400 MW HVDC subsea power cable NordLink between Norway and Germany's Wilster substation near Brokdorf was opened. With almost the same transmission power as the nuclear power plant used to generate, Norwegian hydro power can almost entirely replace the plant, or alternatively surplus German renewable energy can help supply Norway.

As has been planned since 2011 with the German nuclear phase out, the Brokdorf plant was shut down on 31 December 2021.

== Description ==
The plant is a pressurized water reactor with uranium dioxide fuel elements, which are used in degrees of enrichment of 1.9%, 2.5% and 3.5%. It also uses MOX fuel. There are 193 fuel assemblies In the reactor, with a total heavy-metal weight of 103 tons. The power station has a thermal output of 3765 MW, as well as an electrical output of 1440 MW.

The plant is based on the Vor-Konvoi design, which is used in several other nuclear power plants, such as the Grohnde, Grafenrheinfeld and Philippsburg-2 plants in Germany, and the Angra-2 plant in Brazil. It belongs to the 3rd generation of PWR reactors in Germany. With a net generation of just under 12 billion kWh, it was the worldwide leader in 2005.

Vattenfall Europe Nuclear Energy GmbH owns 20% and PreussenElektra GmbH owns 80% of the plant.

== See also ==
- Anti-nuclear movement in Germany
- Energiewende
- Nuclear power in Germany
