= E.ON =

German multinational electric utility

E.ON SE

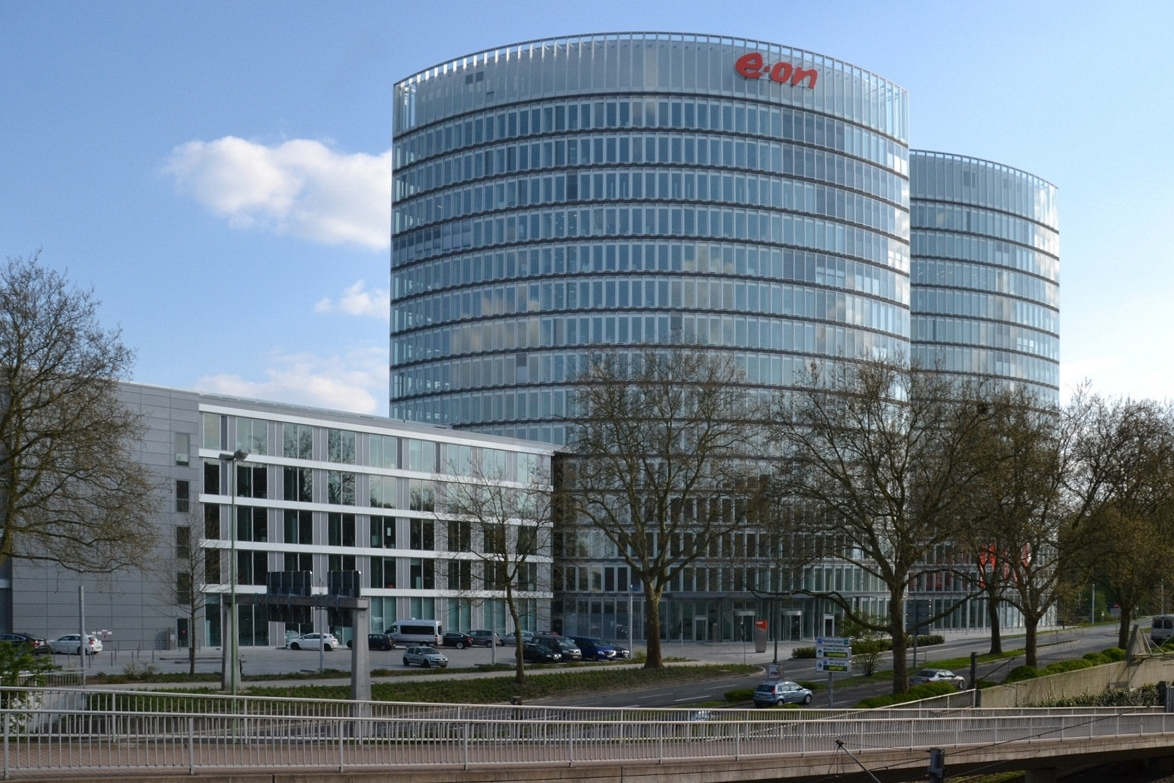
- E.ON's corporate headquarters in Essen, Germany
- Formerly: E.ON AG (2000-2012)
- Type: Public
- Traded as: FWB: EOAN; DAX Component
- ISIN: DE000ENAG999
- Industry: Electric utility
- Predecessor: VEBA; VIAG; PreussenElektra
- Founded: 2000; 26 years ago
- Headquarters: Essen, Germany
- Area served: Europe; United States
- Key people: Leonhard Birnbaum (CEO and chairman of the executive board); Karl-Ludwig Kley (chairman of the supervisory board)
- Products: Electrical power natural gas
- Services: Electricity generation and distribution natural gas exploration, production, transportation and distribution
- Revenue: ▲€115.66 billion (2022)
- Operating income: ▼€2.242 billion (2022)
- Net income: ▲€2.728 billion (2022)
- Total assets: ▲€134.009 billion (2022)
- Total equity: ▲€21.867 billion (2022)
- Number of employees: 69,378 (2022)
- Subsidiaries: E.ON Ruhrgas; E.ON UK; E.ON Sverige
- Website: www.eon.com

E.ON SE is a German multinational electric utility company based in Essen, Germany. It operates as one of the world's largest investor-owned electric utility service providers. The name originates from the Latin word aeon, derived from the Greek αἰών aion, which means age or "infinity", with the period being added to create secondary meanings of "energy" (E) and "illumination" (ON). The company is a component of the DAX stock index.

It operates in over 30 countries and has over 50 million customers. Its chief executive officer is Leonhard Birnbaum. E.ON was created in 2000 through the merger of VEBA and VIAG.

In 2016, it separated its conventional power generation and energy trading operations into a new company, Uniper, while retaining retail, distribution and nuclear operations. E.ON sold its stake in Uniper through a stock market listing and sold the remaining stock to the Finnish utility Fortum.

In March 2018, it was announced that E.ON would acquire the utility portion of renewable energy utility Innogy through a complex €43 billion asset swap deal between E.ON, Innogy and RWE. The deal was approved by the EU antitrust authorities in September 2019, with final execution taking place in July 2020.

In 2019, E.ON became the first of the "Big Six" UK power companies to switch all of its British electricity customers entirely to renewable electricity. However the company still owns coal power in Turkey.

In 2020, E.ON UK announced that it would be migrating customers over to a new subsidiary brand called E.ON Next. E.ON Next also has two million migrated customers from commercial energy firm Npower and Powershop after acquiring both companies.

== History ==
E.ON came into existence in 2000 through the merger of energy companies VEBA and VIAG (Vereinigte Industrieunternehmungen AG, "United Industrial Enterprises Corporation"). In the United Kingdom, Powergen was acquired by E.ON in January 2002. In 2003 E.ON entered the gas market through the €10.3 billion acquisition of Ruhrgas (later: E.ON Ruhrgas). E.ON Ruhrgas was represented in more than 20 countries in Europe.

E.ON also acquired Sydkraft in Sweden and OGK-4 (now: Unipro) in Russia. Sydkraft, Powergen, and OGK-4 were rebranded to E.ON Sverige, E.ON UK, and E.ON Russia respectively. In the United States, E.ON inherited Louisville, Kentucky-based Louisville Gas & Electric Energy, via the acquisition of Powergen, and operated it as E.ON US, until 2010, when E.ON US was sold to Allentown, Pennsylvania-based PPL Corporation for $7.625 billion. The sale was closed on 1 November 2010, with E-ON US becoming LG&E and KU Energy.

E.ON attempted to acquire Endesa in 2006, however this acquisition was overtaken by a joint bid from Italian utility Enel in conjunction with Spanish company Acciona. E.ON acquired about €10 billion of assets that the enlarged Enel was required to divest under EU competition rulings.

In July 2009, the European Commission fined GDF Suez and E.ON €553 million each over arrangements on the MEGAL pipeline. By that time it was the second biggest fine imposed by the European Commission and the first in the energy sector.

In 1975, Ruhrgas and Gaz de France concluded a deal according to which they agreed not to sell gas in each other's home market. The deal was abandoned in 2005.

In 2009, E.ON and RWE established an equally owned joint venture Horizon Nuclear Power to develop around 6,000 MWe of new nuclear capacity in the United Kingdom by 2025 at the Wylfa and Oldbury sites. However, in March 2012 E.ON and RWE announced they were pulling out of the project due to difficult financial conditions.

In August 2011, the company announced a possible loss of 10,000 of its 85,600 employees due to the German decision to close all the country's nuclear power stations by 2022, instead of by 2036 as the Bundestag had decided on 28 October 2010.

In May 2014, the UK energy sector regulator Ofgem ordered the company to pay 330,000 of its customers a total of £12 million due to poor sales practices the company engaged in between June 2010 and December 2013. At the time it was the largest penalty levied against a UK energy supplier.

In November 2014, E.ON announced it would abstain from fossil energy in the future. It transferred its fossil energy businesses into a new company, Uniper, which started operating on 1 January 2016. E.ON sold a 53% stake in the business through a listing on the Frankfurt Stock Exchange in September 2016. In 2017, it agreed to sell its remaining stake in Uniper to the Finnish power company Fortum. The deal was finalized in June 2018, and Uniper continues to operate as an independent entity. However E.ON still owns coal power in Turkey, through its 50% share of Enerjisa.

In July 2018, E.ON announced that 500 jobs would be lost in the United Kingdom, blaming the energy price cap due to be implemented by Ofgem.

In November 2020, E.ON announced that in the next two years, almost 700 jobs will be cut due to the migration of customers to the new platform that will be completed by the end of 2022.

In 2021, E.ON was ranked no. 56 in the Arctic Environmental Responsibility Index (AERI) that covers 120 oil, gas, and mining companies involved in resource extraction north of the Arctic Circle.

Minister of Energy and Natural Resources of the Republic of Turkey Berat Albayrak attended the public offering gong ceremony of Enerjisa Enerji AŞ, whose shareholders are Hacı Ömer Sabancı Holding and German energy company E.ON.

Minister Berat Albayrak stated that the existence of a financially strong, stable and transparent energy market is a must for a solid economy, and drew attention to the fact that an average of 55 billion dollars of energy imports have been realized annually in the last 10 years.

In May 2026, E.ON announced it had reached an agreement to acquire UK supplier OVO Energy, subject to regulatory approval. The Competition and Markets Authority approved the acquisition on 1 October 2026, and it completed on 8 October 2026. The combined company is Britain's second-largest energy supplier, holding a 25% market share.

== Asset swap with RWE ==
In March 2018, it was announced that E.ON would acquire renewable energy utility Innogy from its controlling shareholder RWE. The deal resulted in E.ON becoming a pure retail and distribution company. This was achieved through a complex €43 billion asset swap deal between E.ON, Innogy and RWE, where E.ON took over Innogy's retail and distribution business, while RWE took over both Innogy's renewable energy generation portfolio as well as E.ON's remaining energy generation assets. In addition, RWE took a 16.7% stake in E.ON and E.ON received a cash payment of €1.5 billion. The deal was finalized in September 2019.

== Financial data ==
The key trends for E.ON are (as at the financial year ending 31 December):

Year	Revenue (€ bn)	Net Income (€ bn)	Assets (€ bn)	Employees	Sources
2013	124	2.5	130	61,327	
2014	113	−2.9	125	58,503	
2015	117	−6.3	113	56,490	
2016 (Note: Transfer of the fossil energy businesses into a new company, Uniper, which started operating on 1 January 2016)	39.1	−8.4	63.6	42,595	
2017	38.9	3.9	55.9	42,657	
2018	30.2	3.2	54.3	43,302	
2019 (Note: Asset swap with RWE, integration of Innogy)	41.0	1.5	98.5	78,948	
2020	60.9	1.0	95.3	78,126	
2021	77.3	4.6	119	69,733	
2022	115	1.8	134	69,378	
2023	93.6	0.51	113	71,629	
2024	80.1	4.5	111	75,046	
2025	78.4	3.0	116	76,800	

== Operations ==
E.ON is one of the major public utility companies in Europe and the world's largest investor-owned energy service provider. As result of mergers, E.ON inherited the subsidiaries of VEBA, VIAG and Ruhrgas in Central and Eastern Europe. E.ON is present in most of Scandinavia.

E.ON is organized into the following business areas:

- Customer Solutions
- Energy Networks
- Renewables

=== Nuclear energy ===
E.ON subsidiary PreussenElektra GmbH operates the Brokdorf, Grohnde, and Isar 2 nuclear power plants. It is decommissioning Isar 1, Grafenrheinfeld, Unterweser, Stade and Würgassen nuclear power plants. It also holds minority stakes in the RWE-operated Gundremmingen and Emsland NPPs. According to the assets swap deal between E.ON and RWE, RWE will acquire these minority stakes.

=== Windfarm projects ===
E.ON was a major wind energy player across multiple countries. In October 2019, the renewable energy division EC&R was sold to competitor RWE. The sale included EC&R's assets in the UK, Sweden, Germany, Poland and the US. Notably E.ON UK, owned 30% of the London Array project, which is a 630 MW wind generation farm in the Thames estuary. Another notable wind farm is Roscoe, which was the largest in the world at the time of completion, and for a number of years afterwards.

=== Coal ===
Tufanbeyli coal fired power station in Turkey, is 50% owned by E.ON.

=== Business services ===
E.ON Digital Technology (previously E.ON Business Services until January 2019, E.ON IT and is:energy) is the IT service provider of the energy company E.ON. It bundles business services for finance and HR as well as IT under a single roof and employs around 3,800 people. These are located at four legal entities in Germany (EBS GmbH, EBS Berlin GmbH, EBS Hanover GmbH and EBS Regensburg GmbH); plus legal entities in ten further countries (Belgium, Netherlands, Luxembourg, Czech Republic, Hungary, Italy, Romania, Slovakia, Sweden and United Kingdom).

== Sponsorship ==
=== Sports ===
E.ON UK sponsored the FA Cup for four years, from the 2006–07 FA Cup to the 2009–10 FA Cup. The also included the FA Women's Cup and the FA Youth Cup was worth around £32 million. E.ON was also the official energy partner of The Football League and sponsored a collection of home programmes on Channel Five in the UK. E.ON has previously sponsored ITV Weather, the Ipswich Town football club and the Rugby Cup.

Between 2000 and 2006, E.ON was the main kit sponsor of German Bundesliga club Borussia Dortmund.

E.ON Ruhrgas is the main sponsor of the IBU biathlon World Cup and is the main sponsor of the Ski jumping World Cup.

E.ON Sverige sponsored the home arena of Swedish ice hockey team Timrå IK from 2003 to 2015.

E.ON was one of the main sponsors of 2007–2008 Dutch Eredivisie Champions PSV Eindhoven.

E.ON has been a sponsor of Veloce Racing ever since Veloce joined electric off-road racing series Extreme E in 2021. In 2024, E.ON became the title sponsor of the team to become E.ON Veloce Racing.

Nottingham Forest has announced that E.ON will become the club's official training kit partner. The announcement comes as the Reds return to pre-season training on 3 July 2023. The energy company have partnered with the club since 2021 and have now struck a new deal which will see their logo appear on all men's and women's first-team training wear.

=== Arts ===
Between 1998 and 2014, E.ON and its predecessor company VEBA spent more than Euro30 million ($41 million) supporting the Museum Kunstpalast, located next to the corporate headquarters in Düsseldorf.

In 2014, E.ON decided to sell Jackson Pollock's Number 5 (Elegant Lady) (1951), a painting the company has owned since 1980, at Christie's auction to keep funding the Museum Kunstpalast. Pollock had swapped it in 1954 with New York gallery owner Martha Jackson for the convertible in which he had a fatal accident two years later. In 1980, Ulrich Hartmann, head of VEBA's corporate board office, pushed for the purchase from art dealer Alfred Schmela. The acquisition was considered the foundation for E.ON's art collection of more than 1,800 works.

E.ON is also sponsor of Brain Bar, a Budapest-based, annually held festival on the future.

== Facilities ==
- Elbe Crossing 1
- Elbe Crossing 2
- GKK Etzenricht
- Baltic Cable (operated in cooperation with Baltic-Cable AB)

== See also ==
- European Transmission System Operators
- Gesellschaft für Nuklear-Service
- Power to gas
- Scroby Sands wind farm
