= VEBA =

German multi-industry company

VEBA AG
- Company type: Aktiengesellschaft
- Industry: Energy, Mining, Telecommunication
- Predecessor: Bergwerksgesellschaft Hibernia; Gelsenkirchener Bergwerks-AG; Zeche Mathias Stinnes
- Founded: 8 March 1929
- Founder: State of Prussia
- Defunct: 27 September 2000
- Fate: Amalgamation with VIAG
- Successor: E.ON
- Headquarters: Düsseldorf, Germany
- Area served: Europe
- Key people: Ulrich Hartmann (CEO)
- Products: Power, coal
- Revenue: DM 8.496 billion
- Owner: over 600 000
- Number of employees: 130 000
- Divisions: PreussenElektra, VEBA Oel, Degussa Hüls, Stinnes AG, Vebacom, O.tel.o

VEBA AG (originally from Vereinigte Elektrizitäts und Bergwerks Aktiengesellschaft 'United Electricity and Mining Corporation') was a German state owned energy company. VEBA was founded in 1929 as a holding company owned by the state of Prussia, and was privatized in 1965. In December 1982, VEBA signed a cooperation agreement with the Petróleos de Venezuela (PDVSA) for the establishment of a Joint Venture Ruhr Oel GmbH. VEBA became a part of E.ON in 2000.
