= PreussenElektra =

Former German energy company

PreussenElektra AG
- Company type: Subsidiary
- Industry: Electricity
- Predecessor: Nordwestdeutsche Kraftwerke AG
- Founded: 1927; 99 years ago in Berlin, Germany
- Founder: Prussian state
- Defunct: 2000
- Successor: E.ON
- Area served: Schleswig-Holstein; Lower Saxony part of North Rhine-Westphalia part of Hesse
- Products: Electric power
- Parent: VEBA

PreussenElektra (Preußische Elektrizitäts AG) was a German electric company that existed from 1927 to 2000. From its founding until around 1970, it was owned (directly or indirectly) by the Republic of Prussia and the Federal Republic of Germany. From 1929 until 2000, it was a subsidiary of VEBA. In 2000, it was merged to create E.ON. During its existence, it was the electric utility for Schleswig-Holstein, Lower Saxony, and parts of North Rhine-Westphalia and Hesse.

In 2016, the nuclear energy company of E.ON was renamed PreussenElektra GmbH.

== Early years ==
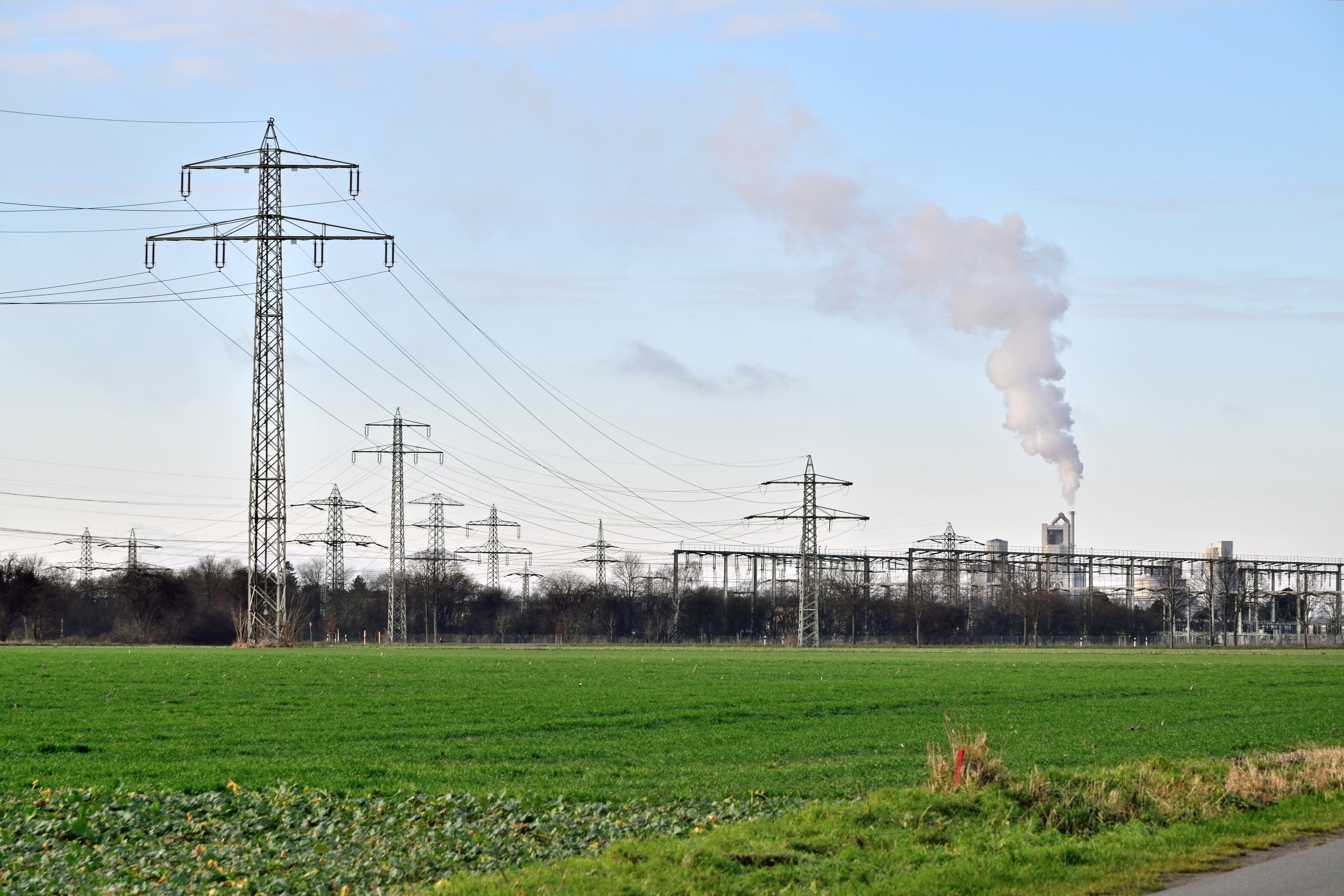
The PreussenElektra power grid was operated by the regional control center at the 220/110 kV substation in Lehrte near Hannover since 1929. Most of the electricity pylons were constructed together with the substation in the 1930s and have the typical Donaumast design used by the company.

PreussenElektra was established in Berlin in 1927 when electricity suppliers Grosskraftwerk Hannover AG, Preussische Kraftwerke Oberweser AG, and Gewerkschaft Grosskraftwerk Main-Weser merged to form PreussenElektra. It operated two thermal power stations, Borken in Hesse and Ahlem in Hanover, and eight hydroelectric stations. The company was to oversee the electricity interests of the Prussian state. The Prussian state also owned the Nordwestdeutsche Kraftwerke AG (NWK), which merged with PreussenElektra in 1985, Ostpreussenwerke AG and the Überlandwerke and Strassenbahnen Hannover AG. Since 1929, PreussenElektra was owned by VEBA holding company.

In 1928–1931, in partnership with municipalities, PreussenElektra founded several regional electricity suppliers. These included Schleswig-Holsteinische Stromversorgungs-AG (now: Schleswig-Holstein Netz AG), Stromsversorgungs-AG Oldenburg-Friedland (now: EWE AG), Elektrizitäts-Aktiengesellschaft Mitteldeutschland (now: EAM GmbH & Co. KG), and Hannover-Braunschweigische Stromversorgungs-AG (now part of Avacon). PreussenElektra also acquired stakes in Braunschweigische Kohlen-Bergwerke AG, Westpreussische Überlandwerke Marienwerder GmbH, and Thüringer Gasgesellschaft (Thüga AG).

== Nazi Germany (1933–1945) ==
In 1937, the annual electricity output of PreussenElektra exceeded 1 TWh. During World War II, the German electricity industry was targeted by Allied bombers. As a result, the construction of the hard coal station in Lahde was disrupted. After the war, PreussenElektra's assets in East Germany came under state control and the headquarters of PreussenElektra were moved from Berlin to Hanover in 1947.

== Nuclear power ==
In 1957 PreussenElektra and NWK, together with other electricity utilities, founded a nuclear energy research company Studiengesellschaft für Kernkrafte GmbH.

== Scandinavian connections ==
During the early 1960s NWK began its cooperation with electric utilities from neighboring countries. In 1961–1962, NWK together with the Danish utility Det Jyskfynske Elsamarbedje (ELSAM; now part of Energinet) completed the 220 kV link from Flensburg to Aabenraa in Denmark. Later Vattenfall, ELSAM and NWK built the Konti-Skan link from Gothenburg to Aalborg. This link, which was to be jointly managed, went into operation in 1964.

== Integration with East Germany ==
According to the German Electricity Agreement of August 22, 1990, PreussenElektra and RWE got 35% each and Bayernwerk 30% of the East-German holding company, which had subsidiaries Vereinigte Kraftwerks AG Peitz and Verbundnetz Elektroenergie AG. In 1991 these two companies were merged to form Vereinigte Energiewerke AG (VEAG). After the merger of VEBA, the parent company of PreussenElektra, and VIAG, the owner of Bayernwerk, in 2000, PreussenElektra merged with Bayernwerk to form E.ON Energie, a subsidiary of E.ON. At the same time VEAG was sold to Hamburgische Elektricitäts-Werke AG (HEW), now 50Hertz Transmission GmbH.

In 1999, PreussenElektra acquired N.V. Electriciteitsbedrijf Zuid-Holland (EZH), a regional utility in the Netherlands.
