= PreussenElektra (nuclear energy company) =

German nuclear power company

PreussenElektra GmbH
- Company type: Subsidiary
- Industry: Nuclear energy
- Headquarters: Hanover, Germany
- Area served: Germany
- Key people: Guido Knott (CEO)
- Products: Electric power
- Number of employees: 2,000
- Parent: E.ON
- Website: preussenelektra.de

PreussenElektra GmbH (former name: E.ON Kernkraft GmbH) is a subsidiary of the German utility E.ON. It is responsible for operation and decommissioning of the E.ON's nuclear assets.

== History ==
In February 1999, Germany deregulated electric power, leading PreussenElektra to launch its retailing arm Elektra Direkt.

After creation of E.ON in 2000, E.ON Kernkraft was created based on the nuclear assets of PreussenElektra AG and Bayernwerk AG. In July 2016, E.ON Kernkraft was renamed PreussenElektra GmbH.

PreussenElektra GmbH operates and owns 83% of the 1.4 GW Grohnde, 80% of the 1.4 GW Brokdorf, and 75% of the 1.5 GW Isar 2 nuclear power plants. Some of these are to be shut down by 2022. It is decommissioning Isar 1 and Unterweser nuclear power plants. It also holds (minority) stakes in the RWE-operated 1.3 GW Gundremmingen (25%) and 12% of the Emsland (1.3 GW) nuclear power plants. According to the assets swap deal between E.ON and RWE, RWE will acquire these minority stakes.

In 2017, PreussenElektra partnered with Assystem to develop the nuclear capabilities of the United Arab Emirates.

Germany's last nuclear power plants were shut down in 2023. In 2024, PreussenElektra started to dismantle the Brokdorf nuclear power plant, Germany's last standing nuclear power plant, and planning to repurpose it as Europe's largest battery storage facility.
