= List of installations for 15 kV AC railway electrification in Sweden =

Electric railways in Sweden are powered by a single-phase AC supply of 15 kV at 16 2/3 Hz, as used in Germany, Austria, and Switzerland. Unlike these countries, the 132 kV traction current grid covers only part of the country, approximately in the north of Stockholm. The grid is fed by frequency converters and lacks direct transmission lines from Norway, which uses the same traction current system. Formerly, the Porjus Hydroelectric Power Station provided electric power to the traction network. In the future, the Älvkarleby Hydroelectric Power Station may be connected to the traction network, as this would increase the stability of the power grid of the railway system. Separate from the 132 kV grid is a 30 kV line connection between the Mon and Varp substations in northern Gothenburg.

The overhead wire system has some differences. It is common for the overhead wire pylons to carry a three-phase AC system. In order to reduce the number of substations, the voltage at the substations for the overhead wire is 32 kV on some lines (AT-System). However, trains require 16 kV, so autotransformers are used, which have a central connection connected with the grounded railway, while the other connections are connected to the 32 kV output. The voltage between the central connection to the phase is 16 kV. The other pole to ground is also 16 kV, but with opposite polarity, and runs along the track on the overhead wires until the separation section. Other lines are fed directly with 16 kV from the substations. However, differential transformers are used for feeding to eliminate jamming signals.

== Sites ==
=== Decentralized Converter Stations ===
Converter Stations only feeding power into the overhead wire.

Place	County	Technology	Power	Year of inauguration
Alingsås	Västra Götaland	Rotary Converter, Static Inverter		
Alvesta	Kronoberg	Rotary Converter		
Älvsjö	Stockholm	Static Inverter		
Åstorp	Skåne	Static Inverter		
Duved	Jämtland	Rotary Converter		
Eksund	Östergötland	Static Inverter		
Eldsberga	Halland	Static Inverter		
Emmaboda	Kalmar	Rotary Converter		
Eskilstuna	Södermanland	Static Inverter		
Falköping	Västra Götaland	Rotary Converter		
Gällivare	Norrbotten	Rotary Converter		
Hässleholm	Skåne	Rotary Converter, Static Inverter		
Jakobshyttan	Östergötland	Rotary Converter		
Järna	Stockholm	Static Inverter		
Kil	Värmland	Rotary Converter		
Kiruna	Norrbotten	Rotary Converter		
Kristinehamn	Värmland	Rotary Converter		
Malmö	Skåne	Static Inverter		
Mellerud	Västra Götaland	Rotary Converter		
Mjölby	Östergötland	Rotary Converter		
Moholm	Västra Götaland	Rotary Converter, Static Inverter		
Mora	Dalarna	Rotary Converter		
Murjek	Norrbotten	Rotary Converter		
Nässjö	Jönköping	Static Inverter		
Nyköping	Södermanland	Rotary Converter		
Olskroken	Västra Götaland	Static Inverter		
Ösmo	Stockholm	Rotary Converter		
Östersund	Jämtland	Rotary Converter		
Ottebol	Värmland	Rotary Converter		
Ramvik	Västernorrland	Rotary Converter		
Sjömarken	Västra Götaland	Rotary Converter		
Sköldinge	Södermanland	Rotary Converter		
Stenbacken	Norrbotten	Rotary Converter		
Tornehamn	Norrbotten	Rotary Converter		
Uddevalla	Västra Götaland	Rotary Converter		
Varberg	Halland	Rotary Converter		
Västerås	Västmanland	Static Inverter		
Ystad	Skåne	Static Inverter		

=== Centralized Converter Stations ===
Converter Stations, which also feed power into the 132 kV single phase AC grid.

Place	County	Technology	Power	Year of inauguration
Ånge	Västernorrland	Static Inverter		
Bastuträsk	Västerbotten	Static Inverter		
Borlänge	Dalarna	Static Inverter		
Boden	Norrbotten	Static Inverter/ Rotary Converter		
Häggvik	Stockholm	Rotary Converter		
Mellansel	Västernorrland	Static Inverter		
Ockelbo	Gävleborg	Static Inverter		

=== Substations ===
Substations fed from the 132 kV single phase AC grid.

Place	County
Bäckhaga	Örebro
Bispgården	Jämtland
Dalstorp	Västerbotten
Dockmyr	Jämtland
Frövi	Örebro
Gävle	Gävleborg
Gnarp	Gävleborg
Habo	Uppsala
Holmsjön	Västernorrland
Hudiksvall	Gävleborg
Jönssen	Gävleborg
Jörn	Västerbotten
Kullsbjörken	Dalarna
Ljusdal	Gävleborg
Ludvika	Dalarna
Långträsk	Norrbotten
Norrfors	Västerbotten
Odensala	Stockholm
Ramsjö	Gävleborg
Ryggen	Dalarna
Storvik	Gävleborg
Sundsvall	Västernorrland
Söderhamn	Gävleborg
Tierp	Uppsala
Uppsala	Uppsala
Viskan	Västernorrland
Vännäs	Västerbotten
Älvsbyn	Norrbotten
Österåsen	Västernorrland

=== 30 kV-line Mon-Varp ===
Endpoints of the 30 kV-interconnection Mon-Varp.

Place	County
Mon	Västra Götaland
Varp	Västra Götaland

=== Other remarkable points ===
The crossing-point between the traction current power line and HVDC Fenno-Skan 2 is the only crossing point of the HVDC overhead line and single-phase AC overhead powerline in the world. It is located at coordinates 60°28′45.2″N 17°14′11″E..

The railway on the Öresund bridge is fed with Danish standard voltage, 25 kV 50 Hz AC, which goes along 6 km within Swedish borders. The power is supplied from Denmark. The system limit is at Lernacken, near the bridge abutment.

Two local railways in Stockholm County, Roslagsbanan and Saltsjöbanan, as well as Stockholm Metro and all tramways, run on DC power.
