= Güstrow Solarpark =

Photovoltaic power station near Güstrow, Germany

- Country: Germany
- Location: Güstrow
- Coordinates: 53°47′N 12°13′E
- Status: Operational
- Commission date: 28 June 2012

Solar farm
- Type: Flat-panel PV
- Site area: 75 ha (185 acres)

Power generation
- Units operational: 127,776
- Nameplate capacity: 31 MW_{p}

Güstrow Solarpark is a 31-megawatt (MW) photovoltaic power station near Güstrow, Germany. It was built on the site of a former sugar factory and covers an area of 75 hectares (185 acres).

== See also ==
- PV system
- List of photovoltaic power stations
- Solar power in Germany
- Electricity sector in Germany
