= List of installations for 15 kV AC railway electrification in Germany, Austria and Switzerland =

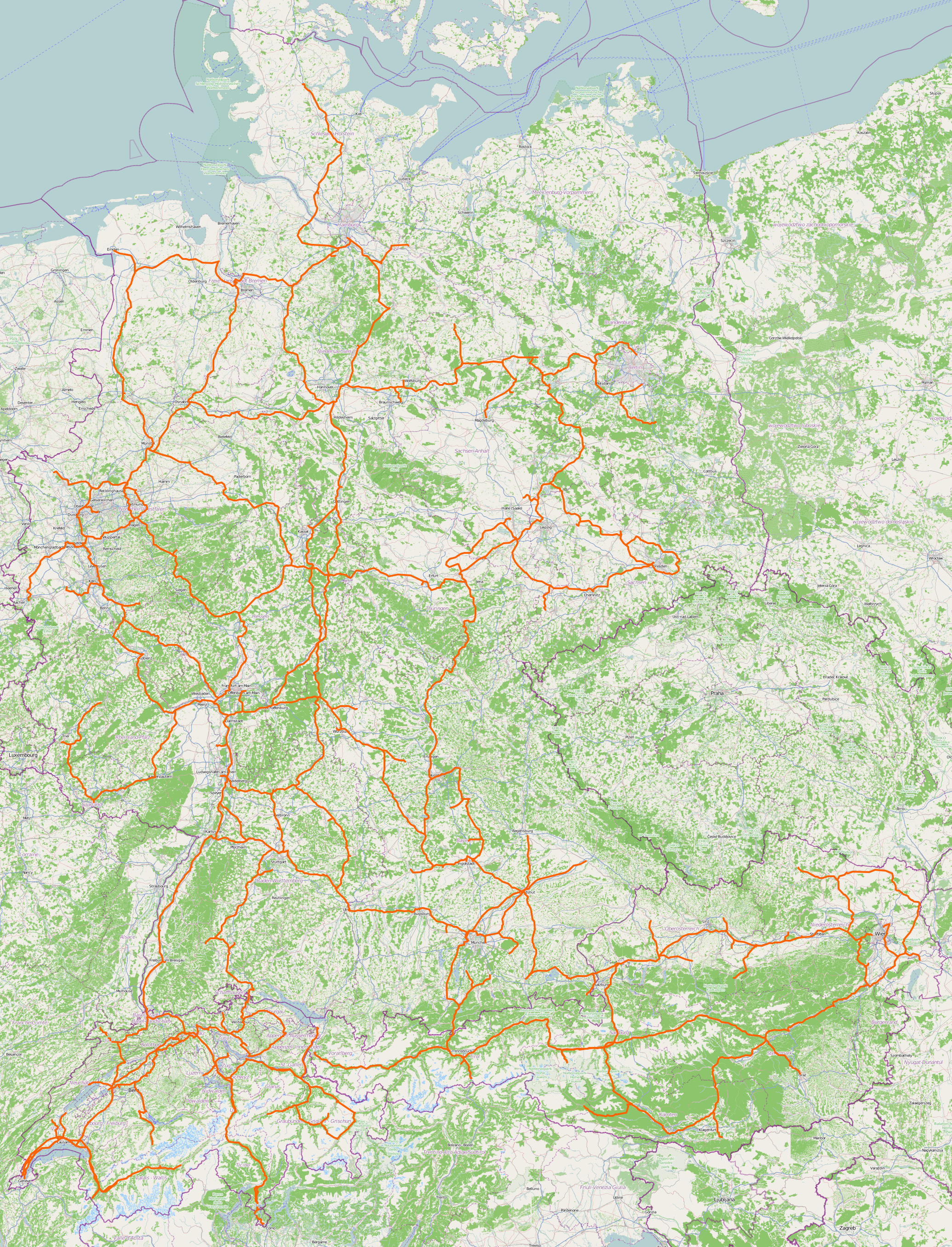
Map of the high voltage power grid used for power supply of electric railways in Germany, Switzerland and Austria

Germany, Austria and Switzerland operate the largest interconnected 15 kV 16.7 Hz system, which has central generation, a special transmission network, central and decentral converter plants.

== Germany ==
In Germany, the voltage of traction current grid is 110 kV. In the Northeastern parts of Germany there is no traction current grid, as decentralized converter plants situated at the substations are used.

Facility	Coordinates
Aalen	48°49′20″N 10°02′31″E
Adelsheim	49°24′57″N 9°24′17″E
Almstedt	52°01′53″N 9°56′26″E
Amstetten	48°34′08″N 9°52′37″E
Appenweier	48°32′37″N 7°58′23″E
Aschaffenburg	49°59′08″N 9°05′33″E
Aubing	48°09′08″N 11°26′40″E
Augsburg	48°23′54″N 10°52′0″E
Bachstedt (planned)	51°03′18″N 11°11′32″E
Bad Reichenhall	47°44′51″N 12°54′09″E
Baden-Baden	48°44′03″N 8°08′49″E
Barnstorf	52°42′26″N 8°30′40″E
Bebra	50°58′32″N 9°47′23″E
Bengel	50°0′34″N 7°03′23″E
Berlin-Schönefeld	52°23′39″N 13°31′03″E
Biblis	49°41′03″N 8°26′39″E
Bingen	49°57′16″N 7°56′54″E
Böhla	51°14′08″N 13°32′44″E
Boizenburg	53°23′29″N 10°43′58″E
Borken (part of converter)	51°03′07″N 9°17′01″E
Borne	52°06′40″N 12°32′28″E
Braunschweig	52°16′09″N 10°38′24″E
Buchholz	53°19′20″N 9°51′44″E
Burgdorf	47°03′44″N 7°36′41″E
Burgweinting	48°58′53″N 12°09′13″E
Chemnitz (part of converter)	50°51′44″N 12°56′21″E
Datteln	51°37′43″N 7°20′03″E
Denkendorf	48°56′19″N 11°27′19″E
Donauwörth	48°42′58″N 10°45′43″E
Dörstewitz (planned)	51°23′35″N 11°54′16″E
Dortmund	51°30′38″N 7°24′03″E
Dortmund-Scharnhorst	51°32′14″N 7°31′56″E
Dresden (part of converter)	50°59′40″N 13°50′06″E
Duisburg	51°24′45″N 6°47′33″E
Düsseldorf	51°13′18″N 6°50′11″E
Ebensfeld	50°05′0″N 10°57′41″E
Eggolsheim	49°45′10″N 11°03′27″E
Eichenberg	51°22′34″N 9°55′31″E
Eilenburg	51°26′48″N 12°37′08″E
Eischleben (planned)	50°53′02″N 10°58′55″E
Eisenach	50°57′51″N 10°22′19″E
Elmshorn	53°45′45″N 9°39′17″E
Elsfleth	53°16′52″N 8°28′26″E
Emden	53°21′30″N 7°13′11″E
Emskirchen	49°33′30″N 10°41′43″E
Essen	51°27′24″N 7°01′39″E
Eutingen	48°28′47″N 8°46′44″E
Eystrup	52°47′32″N 9°13′45″E
Fallersleben	52°25′16″N 10°40′30″E
Finnentrop	51°10′03″N 7°58′01″E
Flieden	50°25′08″N 9°34′18″E
Flörsheim	50°0′17″N 8°24′54″E
Freiburg	47°58′52″N 7°49′41″E
Friedberg	50°19′28″N 8°46′25″E
Fronhausen	50°41′55″N 8°41′53″E
Fulda	50°32′40″N 9°41′28″E
Gabelbach	48°22′45″N 10°33′35″E
Garssen	52°40′30″N 10°07′44″E
Geisenbrunn	48°06′29″N 11°19′51″E
Geltendorf	48°06′21″N 11°01′48″E
Gemünden	50°03′35″N 9°40′38″E
Genshagener Heide	52°20′05″N 13°16′38″E
Gleidingen	52°16′01″N 9°50′06″E
Golm	52°24′10″N 12°58′08″E
Gössnitz (old)	50°52′36″N 12°25′10″E
Gössnitz (new)	50°54′07″N 12°25′59″E
Grafing	48°02′53″N 11°56′12″E
Grönhart	48°59′29″N 10°55′48″E
Grossheringen	51°06′22″N 11°39′19″E
Grosskorbetha	51°15′12″N 12°01′14″E
Grünauer Kreuz (switching post)	52°25′31″N 13°33′42″E
Güsen	52°20′07″N 11°58′42″E
Hagen	51°24′32″N 7°27′43″E
Hahn (planned)	53°17′42″N 8°09′52″E
Halbe (fed from 15 kV line from Neuhof)	52°07′00″N 13°41′31″E
Haltingen	47°36′19″N 7°36′40″E
Hamburg-Harburg (part of converter)	53°26′57″N 10°00′02″E
Hameln	52°08′26″N 9°26′43″E
Haren	52°47′02″N 7°18′04″E
Heeren	52°34′28″N 11°52′05″E
Herbolzheim	48°13′58″N 7°46′09″E
Herchen	50°46′11″N 7°31′19″E
Hessental	49°05′58″N 9°46′36″E
Höchst	50°06′12″N 8°33′28″E
Holzkirchen	47°53′0″N 11°41′56″E
Ihringshausen	51°21′07″N 9°32′14″E
Ilmenau-Wolfsberg (planned)	50°41′17″N 10°59′54″E
Ingolstadt	48°46′48″N 11°25′34″E
Jübek (part of converter)	54°33′25″N 9°24′35″E
Kaiserslautern	49°26′16″N 7°42′19″E
Karow	52°36′29″N 13°27′30″E
Karthaus	49°42′28″N 6°35′28″E
Kirchheim	50°52′40″N 9°35′13″E
Kirchmöser	52°22′55″N 12°24′36″E
Klebitz	51°56′32″N 12°50′12″E
Koblenz	50°23′12″N 7°33′52″E
Köln (part of converter)	50°54′14″N 7°02′55″E
Köln-Mülheim	50°58′21″N 7°01′07″E
Körle	51°10′51″N 9°31′48″E
Kreiensen	51°50′54″N 9°58′11″E
Kyhna	51°30′42″N 12°16′50″E
Landshut	48°32′48″N 12°06′31″E
Leer	53°12′48″N 7°27′53″E
Lehrte (part of converter)	52°22′54″N 9°57′20″E
Leipzig-Wahren	51°22′55″N 12°18′47″E
Leonberg	48°47′35″N 8°58′28″E
Limburg	50°22′45″N 8°05′59″E
Löhne	52°11′42″N 8°42′35″E
Lüneburg	53°16′01″N 10°24′42″E
Magdeburg	52°09′12″N 11°39′35″E
Mainbernheim	49°42′0″N 10°12′39″E
Mannheim	49°26′27″N 8°33′43″E
Markt Bibart	49°38′48″N 10°25′24″E
Markt Schwaben	48°11′06″N 11°50′59″E
Marl (part of converter)	51°39′42″N 7°10′45″E
Meckesheim	49°19′45″N 8°48′19″E
Mehrhoog	51°44′55″N 6°29′57″E
Montabaur	50°26′43″N 7°49′13″E
Mörlach	49°11′57″N 11°14′24″E
Mottgers	50°16′43″N 9°39′21″E
Mühlacker	48°57′06″N 8°50′15″E
Mühlanger	51°51′02″N 12°45′54″E
Muldenstein	51°39′31″N 12°21′01″E
Müllheim	47°48′20″N 7°35′44″E
München-Freimann	48°11′56″N 11°36′30″E
München-Ost	48°08′13″N 11°39′02″E
Münster	51°55′25″N 7°38′05″E
Murnau	47°41′19″N 11°11′33″E
Nannhofen	48°12′58″N 11°11′20″E
Neckarelz	49°20′21″N 9°07′0″E
Neumarkt (Oberpfalz)	49°16′06″N 11°27′45″E
Neudittendorf	50°54′29″N 10°53′38″E
Neuhof	52°08′03″N 13°28′49″E
Neumünster	54°06′33″N 9°56′49″E
Neu-Ulm (part of converter)	48°23′52″N 10°01′18″E
Niedernhausen	50°09′24″N 8°19′09″E
Niemberg	51°33′33″N 12°06′10″E
Nörten-Hardenberg	51°38′21″N 9°56′12″E
Nürnberg (part of converter)	49°25′22″N 11°00′30″E
Nürnberg-Stein (part of converter)	49°25′47″N 11°00′19″E
Oberacker	49°05′23″N 8°43′55″E
Oberdachstetten	49°25′03″N 10°25′31″E
Oelde	51°49′31″N 8°07′27″E
Offenbach am Main	50°06′13″N 8°47′17″E
Offenburg	48°27′30″N 7°55′10″E
Orscheid	50°39′18″N 7°19′24″E
Osnabrück	52°15′56″N 8°07′04″E
Plattling	48°46′49″N 12°51′08″E
Plochingen	48°43′08″N 9°23′31″E
Pretzier	52°49′48″N 11°16′49″E
Pulling	48°22′12″N 11°42′50″E
Rathenow	52°35′26″N 12°16′39″E
Remagen	50°34′06″N 7°14′35″E
Rethen	52°17′29″N 9°48′47″E
Riesa	51°18′41″N 13°16′0″E
Ritterhude	53°11′37″N 8°45′47″E
Rödelheim	50°08′29″N 8°35′49″E
Rohrbach	49°58′59″N 9°42′12″E
Röhrmoos	48°19′24″N 11°26′49″E
Rosenheim	47°50′44″N 12°07′58″E
Rotenburg (new)	53°06′28″N 9°21′06″E
Rotenburg (old)	53°06′26″N 9°21′17″E
Roth (planned)	50°22′57″N 11°02′13″E
Rottweil	48°07′56″N 8°39′18″E
Rudersdorf	50°50′04″N 8°8′58″E
Saalfeld	50°38′42″N 11°22′35″E
Saarbrücken (part of converter)	49°14′38″N 6°58′40″E
Salzbergen	52°19′42″N 7°20′39″E
Saubachtal (planned)	51°12′20″N 11°32′33″E
Siegburg	50°47′23″N 7°12′30″E
Sindorf	50°53′34″N 6°39′14″E
Singen	47°45′29″N 8°52′54″E
Solpke	52°30′02″N 11°17′43″E
Sommerau	48°07′39″N 8°18′41″E
Steinbach am Wald	50°26′10″N 11°22′51″E
Stetzsch	51°04′35″N 13°39′36″E
Stolberg	50°47′29″N 6°12′06″E
Stuttgart-Rohr	48°42′50″N 9°06′35″E
Stuttgart-Zazenhausen	48°50′40″N 9°11′03″E
Traunstein	47°52′06″N 12°37′42″E
Uelzen	52°57′50″N 10°32′37″E
Urbach	50°33′15″N 7°34′26″E
Vaihingen / Enz	48°56′35″N 8°57′58″E
Wächtersbach	50°14′44″N 9°17′18″E
Waiblingen	48°49′31″N 9°17′51″E
Waigolshausen	49°58′01″N 10°06′59″E
Warburg	51°29′50″N 9°08′58″E
Weimar (part of converter)	50°59′27″N 11°20′34″E
Weiterstadt	49°54′38″N 8°34′29″E
Werdau	50°43′11″N 12°22′11″E
Wickrath	51°07′15″N 6°23′44″E
Wiesbaden	50°01′52″N 8°15′59″E
Wiesental	49°13′19″N 8°29′48″E
Wolfratshausen	47°54′30″N 11°25′32″E
Wörsdorf	50°14′09″N 8°14′51″E
Wunstorf	52°24′56″N 9°28′58″E
Würzburg	49°48′06″N 9°53′52″E
Wurzen	51°21′47″N 12°44′45″E
Wustermark	52°32′26″N 12°58′25″E
Zapfendorf (shut down)	50°01′33″N 10°56′29″E

=== Switching stations ===
Switching stations without power conversion, generation or feeding of overhead wires.

Facility	Coordinates
Gabelbach	48°22′49″N 10°33′32″E
Kirchhellen	51°37′56″N 6°57′9″E
Neckarwestheim	49°2′34″N 9°12′6″E
Nenndorf	53°22′35″N 9°54′13″E
Nitzahn	52°27′35″N 12°20′45″E
Schönarts	49°57′46″N 9°49′08″E

=== Central converter plants ===
In these facilities AC from the public grid is transformed into single phase AC and fed into the traction current grid. At some facilities, power is also fed to the overhead wires. Conversion is made by machines or by electronic means.

Facility	Year of commissioning	Power	Technology	Coordinates
Aschaffenburg	2010	60 MW	GTO-thyristor	49°59′08″N 9°05′33″E
Borken	1963	50 MW	Rotary converter	51°3′7″N 9°17′01″E
Bremen		100 MW	GTO-thyristor	53°7′49″N 8°40′49″E
Chemnitz	1965		Rotary converter	50°51′42″N 12°56′18″E
Dresden	1977		Rotary converter	50°59′40″N 13°50′6″E
Düsseldorf		30 MW	GTO-thyristor	51°13′18″N 6°50′11″E
Hamburg-Harburg			Rotary converter	53°26′55″N 10°0′6″E
Jübek		14 MW	GTO-thyristor	54°33′25″N 9°24′34″E
Karlsfeld		100 MW	GTO-thyristor	48°12′57″N 11°26′06″E
Karlsruhe	1957	53 MW	Rotary converter	48°58′49″N 8°22′34″E
Köln	1957	75 MW	Rotary converter	50°54′14″N 7°2′55″E
Lehrte	1963 (rotary converter)/ 2010 (inverter)	37 MW (rotary converter)/ 64 MW (inverter)	Rotary converter/ inverter	52°22′54″N 9°57′15″E
Limburg		120 MW	IGCT inverter	50°24′20″N 8°3′58″E
Marl	1963	25 MW	Rotary converter	51°39′40″N 7°10′47″E
Neckarwestheim	1989	140 MW	Rotary converter	49°2′22″N 9°10′40″E
Neckarwestheim II	2011	140 MW	GTO-thyristor	48°2′16″N 9°10′40″E
Neu-Ulm			Rotary converter	48°23′51″N 10°1′16″E
Nürnberg	1939	34	Rotary converter	49°25′48″N 11°0′18″E
Nürnberg	2012	75	IGBT-Inverter	49°25′48″N 11°0′18″E
Pforzheim (shut down)			Rotary converter	
Saarbrücken			Rotary converter	49°14′37″N 6°58′35″E
Singen (shut down in 2002)			Rotary converter	47°45′29″N 8°52′54″E
Thyrow	2004/2005	8×15 = 120 MW	GTO-thyristor	52°14′0″N 13°18′10″E
Weimar	1973		Rotary converter	50°59′27″N 11°20′34″E

=== Decentral converter plants ===
In these facilities AC from the public grid is transformed into single phase AC and fed only to the overhead wires. Conversion is made by machines or by electronic means.

Facility	Year of inauguration	Maximum transmission rate	Used technology	Coordinates
Adamsdorf	1984		Rotary converter	53°24′31″N 13°2′43″E
Anklam			Rotary converter	53°50′46″N 13°43′0″E
Berlin-Rummelsburg	1984		Rotary converter	52°29′12″N 13°30′33″E
Bützow (demolished)			Rotary converter	53°49′30″N 11°59′3″E
Cottbus	1989		Rotary converter	51°45′0″N 14°17′12″E
Doberlug-Kirchhain	1981 (Umformer), 2008 (Inverter)		Inverter	51°38′49″N 13°34′51″E
Eberswalde	1987		Rotary converter	52°50′40″N 13°48′1″E
Falkenberg	1987		Rotary converter	51°34′50″N 13°15′26″E
Oder			Rotary converter	52°21′17″N 14°28′42″E
Lalendorf			Rotary converter	53°45′15″N 12°23′54″E
Löwenberger Land			Rotary converter	52°54′5″N 13°11′18″E
Ludwigsfelde	1981		Rotary converter	52°18′17″N 13°16′31″E
Lübeck-Genin	2008		Inverter	?
Magdeburg (shut down)	1974		Rotary converter	52°9′14″N 11°39′40″E
Neustadt (Dosse)			Rotary converter	52°50′51″N 12°27′24″E
Oberröblingen			Rotary converter	51°26′42″N 11°17′44″E
Prenzlau			Rotary converter	53°19′59″N 13°52′21″E
Rosslau			Rotary converter	51°53′51″N 12°14′29″E
Rostock	1985		Rotary converter	54°3′54″N 12°8′39″E
Schwerin	1987		Rotary converter	53°35′39″N 11°23′11″E
Senftenberg	1988		Rotary converter	51°31′58″N 14°1′14″E
Stendal			Rotary converter	52°35′0″N 11°52′7″E
Stralsund			Rotary converter	54°17′9″N 13°5′23″E
Wittenberg	1978		Rotary converter	51°52′30″N 12°41′20″E
Wittenberge	1987		Rotary converter	52°59′46″N 11°46′8″E
Wolkramshausen			Inverter	51°26′19″N 10°44′8″E
Wünsdorf	1982		Rotary converter	52°10′24″N 13°27′42″E
Wustermark			Rotary converter	52°32′33″N 12°58′25″E

=== Power plants ===
Facility	Year of inauguration	Power	Facility type	Town	Coordinates
Aschaffenburg (shut down)	1961-1996	150 MW	Coal-fired power plant	Aschaffenburg, Bavaria	49°58′6.1″N 9°5′42.8″E
Aufkirchen			Hydroelectric power plant	Oberding, Bavaria	48°18′18.9″N 11°51′27.77″E
Bad Abbach	2000	3.5 MW	Hydroelectric power plant	Bad Abbach, Bavaria	48°56′47″N 12°00′47″E
Bad Reichenhall	1912	7.2 MW	Hydroelectric power plant	Bad Reichenhall, Bavaria	47°43′5.36″N 12°51′47.3″E
Bergheim	1970	23.7 MW	Hydroelectric power plant	Bergheim, Bavaria	48°45′2.7″N 11°16′22.73″E
Bertoldsheim	1967	18.9 MW	Hydroelectric power plant	Rennertshofen, Bavaria	48°44′8.6″N 11°1′15″E
Bittenbrunn	1969	20.2 MW	Hydroelectric power plant	Bittenbrunn, Bavaria	48°44′4″N 11°8′37.14″E
Datteln			Coal-fired power plant	Datteln, North Rhine-Westphalia	51°37′48.16″N 7°19′52.73″E
Eitting Hydroelectric Power Plant			Hydroelectric power plant	Eitting, Bavaria	48°21′32.25″N 11°52′58.07″E
Frankfurt Traction Current Power Plant	1966	12 MW	Thermal power plant	Frankfurt am Main, Hessen	50°05′48.88″N 8°39′5.26″E
Ingolstadt	1971	19.8 MW	Hydroelectric power plant	Ingolstadt, Bavaria	48°45′1.32″N 11°24′43.03″E
Kammerl	1905		Hydroelectric power plant	Saulgrub, Bavaria	47°39′42.49″N 10°59′12.62″E
Kirchmöser		160 MW	Gas turbine power plant	Brandenburg an der Havel, Brandenburg	52°23′40.55″N 12°25′4.97″E
Langenprozelten	1976	160 MW	Hydroelectric power plant	Gemünden am Main, Bavaria	50°3′11.27″N 9°34′52.87″E
Lausward			Coal-fired power plant	Düsseldorf, North Rhine-Westphalia	51°13′15.03″N 6°43′53.66″E
Lünen	1984	110 MW	Coal-fired power plant	Lünen, North Rhine-Westphalia	51°37′48.16″N 7°19′52.73″E
Mannheim	1955	190 MW	Coal-fired power plant	Mannheim, Baden-Württemberg	49°26′36.73″N 8°30′9.76″E
Muldenstein (retired)	1912	11.3 MW	Coal-fired power plant	Muldenstein, Saxony-Anhalt	51°39′25.57″N 12°20′59.33″E
Mittelsbüren		110 MW	Coal-fired power plant	Bremen, Bremen	53°7′44.33″N 8°41′0.22″E
Neckarwestheim I	1976	190 MW	Nuclear power plant	Neckarwestheim, Baden-Württemberg	49°2′24.41″N 9°10′19.59″E
Pfrombach			Hydroelectric power plant	Pfrombach, Bavaria	48°26′28.94″N 11°59′34.43″E
Schkopau Power Station	1996	110 MW	Coal-fired power plant	Schkopau, Saxony	51°23′54.44″N 11°57′1.17″E
Stuttgart-Münster Power Station (traction current generation ceased)	1933-1976		Coal-fired power plant	Stuttgart, Baden-Württemberg	48°48′55.4″N 9°13′15.85″E
Vohburg			Hydroelectric power plant	Vohburg, Bavaria	48°46′40.5″N 11°36′4.04″E
Walchensee	1924		Hydroelectric power plant	Kochel am See, Bavaria	47°37′47.35″N 11°20′14.8″E

=== Border crossing powerlines ===
==== Germany - Austria ====
Line	Coordinates
Walchenseekraftwerk - Zirl	47°23′55″N 11°15′53″E
Traunstein - Steinsdorf	47°53′20″N 12°58′25″E

==== Former inner German border ====
Line	Coordinates
Lehrte - Heeren	52°24′48″N 10°59′34″E
Bebra - Weimar	51°00′29″N 10°12′13″E
Steinfeld am Wald - Saalfeld	50°27′52″N 11°25′07″E
Lüneburg - Boizenburg	53°23′44″N 10°37′11″E

=== Points where two powerlines for traction current cross each other without interconnection ===
Lines	Coordinates
Flieden-Bebra / Fulda-Mottgers	50°28′55″N 9°40′52″E
Bebra-Borken / Kirchheim-Körle	51°01′59″N 9°34′31″E
Karlsruhe-Mühlacker /Vaihingen-Graben/Neudorf	48°56′40″N 8°48′18″E
Orscheid-Köln / Orscheid-Montabaur	50°39′15″N 7°19′28″E
Mannheim-Neckarelz / Mannheim-Wiesental	49°25′38″N 8°34′9″E

== Switzerland ==
In Switzerland, the voltage levels of the traction power grid are 132 kV/66 kV. At Muttenz and Etzwilen, there are transformers for coupling to 110 kV level of the traction power grid of Germany.

=== Substations ===
In these facilities electricity is transformed down from 132 kV or 66 kV to 15 kV. There is no conversion or generation of power.

Facility	Coordinates
Balerna	45°50′52″N 9°00′11″E
Biel	47°7′48″N 7°15′26″E
Brugg	47°28′28″N 8°12′16″E
Burgdorf	47°03′44″N 7°36′41″E
Bussigny	46°32′38″N 6°33′36″E
Chur	46°52′24″N 9°31′57″E
Croy	46°42′00″N 6°28′33″E
Courtemaîche	47°27′21″N 7°3′20″E
Delémont	47°21′49″N 7°21′30″E
Eglisau	47°34′22″N 8°30′50″E
Emmenbrücke	47°4′4″N 8°17′9″E
Etzwilen	47°39′42″N 8°49′7″E
Farsch	46°49′25″N 9°23′59″E
Filisur (RhB)	46°40′19″N 9°41′36″E
Flüelen	46°53′43″N 8°37′29″E
Fribourg	46°48′50″N 7°9′15″E
Frutigen	46°34′48″N 7°38′56″E
Gampel	46°18′28″N 7°45′24″E
Genève-Tuileries	46°14′59″N 6°8′48″E
Giornico	46°24′5″N 8°52′23″E
Gland	46°24′52″N 6°15′48″E
Hendschiken	47°23′29″N 8°12′16″E
Kandersteg	46°30′10″N 7°40′28″E
Küblis (RhB)	46°54′49″N 9°46′56″E
Melide	45°57′59″N 8°56′54″E
Muttenz	47°32′5″N 7°38′38″E
Neuchâtel	46°59′25″N 6°54′56″E
Killwangen	47°26′13″N 8°20′38″E
Olten	47°21′40″N 7°55′20″E
Puidoux	46°29′21″N 6°45′41″E
Rapperswil SG	47°13′29″N 8°49′55″E
Rivera	46°7′32″N 8°55′27″E
Roche	46°21′52″N 6°55′28″E
Romont FR	46°41′4″N 6°54′23″E
Rotkreuz	47°8′42″N 8°26′27″E
Sagliains (RhB)	46°45′44″N 10°05′39″E
Saint Léonard	46°15′8″N 7°25′21″E
Sankt Margrethen	47°27′12″N 9°38′22″E
Sargans	47°2′26″N 9°27′8″E
Seebach	47°25′20″N 8°33′17″E
Selfranga	46°51′20″N 9°53′03″E
Sihlbrugg	47°14′34″N 8°34′37″E
Sils (RhB)	46°42′8″N 9°28′8″E
Stein AG	47°32′29″N 7°57′59″E
Steinen	47°2′53″N 8°36′17″E
Tavanasa (RhB)	46°45′09″N 9°02′42″E
Thun	46°46′20″N 7°35′53″E
Varzo (Italy, operated by SBB)	46°12′25″N 8°14′31″E
Wanzwil	47°11′49″N 7°41′40″E
Wetzikon ZH	47°18′35″N 8°47′56″E
Winterthur-Grüze	47°30′0″N 8°45′4″E
Yverdon	46°46′03″N 6°38′51″E
Ziegelbrücke	47°7′59″N 9°3′55″E
Zürich	47°22′52″N 8°31′19″E

=== Central converter plants ===
In these facilities AC from the public grid is transformed into single phase AC and fed into the traction current grid. At some facilities, power is also fed to the overhead wires. Conversion is made by machines or by electronic means.

Facility	Year of inauguration	Maximum transmission rate	Used technology	Coordinates
Bever (RhB)			Rotary converter	46°32′52″N 9°53′17″E
Landquart (RhB)			Rotary converter	46°58′28″N 9°33′6″E
Giubiasco			Rotary converter	46°10′32″N 9°0′9″E
Kerzers			Rotary converter	46°58′27″N 7°11′25″E
Massaboden			Rotary converter	46°19′55″N 8°0′42″E
Rupperswil			Rotary converter	47°24′21″N 8°6′19″E
Seebach			Rotary converter	47°25′20″N 8°33′17″E
Wimmis			Rotary converter	46°40′51″N 7°39′23″E

=== Switching stations ===
Switching stations without power conversion, generation or feeding of overhead wires.

Facility	Coordinates
Zollikofen	47°0′45″N 7°27′53″E

=== Power plants ===
Facility	Year of inauguration	Maximum power	Type of facility	Coordinates
Amsteg	1922	55 MW	Hydroelectric power plant	46°46′2.18″N 8°40′13.6″E
Le Châtelard VS			Hydroelectric power plant	46°3′40.94″N 6°57′29.39″E
Etzelwerk			Hydroelectric power plant	47°11′39.68″N 8°48′40.04″E
Göschenen			Hydroelectric power plant	46°40′2.18″N 8°35′6.81″E
Gösgen		51,3 MW	Hydroelectric power plant	47°22′8.01″N 7°58′45.92″E
Klosters			Hydroelectric power plant	46°51′39.62″N 9°53′44.9″E
Lungerersee	1994	9 MW	Hydroelectric power plant	46°49′20.51″N 8°10′25.52″E
Massaboden	1916	7,2 MW	Hydroelectric power plant	46°19′56.92″N 8°0′43.2″E
Mühleberg	1921	45 MW	Hydroelectric power plant	46°58′9″N 7°17′4″E
Ritom	1920		Hydroelectric power plant	46°31′2.05″N 8°40′33.41″E
Rupperswil	1945		Hydroelectric power plant	47°24′42.34″N 8°6′52.66″E
Vernayaz			Hydroelectric power plant	46°7′59.93″N 7°2′8.8″E
Wassen			Hydroelectric power plant	46°42′55.96″N 8°36′36.55″E

=== Border crossing powerlines ===
==== Germany-Switzerland ====
Leitung	Coordinates
Holdingen - Muttenz	47°34′53″N 07°36′14″E
Singen - Etzwilen	47°42′49″N 08°49′52″E

=== Points where two powerlines for traction current cross each other without interconnection ===
Lines	Coordinates
Bussigny-Croy / Romanel-Les Tuileries	46°33′45″N 6°31′45″E
Puidoux-Kerzers / Bussigny-Chamoson	46°32′09″N 6°48′11″E
Puidoux-Vernayaz/ Bussigny-Chamoson	46°22′07″N 6°55′23″E
Puidoux-Vernayaz/ Bussigny-Chamoson	46°10′26″N 7°01′50″E
Puidoux-Vernayaz/ Vernayaz Branch	46°08′48″N 7°02′16″E
Vernayaz-Brig/ Bussigny-Chamoson	46°06′52″N 7°05′55″E

== Austria ==
In Austria, the voltage of traction current grid is 110 kV, except of the lines Meidling-Hütteldorf, Hütteldorf-Auhof, Hütteldorf-Floridsdorf, Floridsdorf-Simmering and Meidling-Simmering, which are operated with 55 kV.

=== Substations ===
In these facilities electricity is transformed down from 110/55 kV-level of OBB to 15 kV. There is no conversion or generation of power.

Facility	Coordinates
Absdorf	48°23′52″N 15°59′38″E
Angern	48°22′56″N 16°49′19″E
Amstetten (Österreich)	48°7′9″N 14°53′7″E
Asten	48°14′2″N 14°24′20″E
Attnang-Puchheim	48°1′8″N 13°43′38″E
Bad Vöslau	47°58′06″N 16°13′28″E
Bludenz	47°8′41″N 9°49′44″E
Bruck Mur	47°25′42″N 15°16′26″E
Dölsach	46°48′53″N 12°49′55″E
Dorfgastein	47°14′5″N 13°6′17″E
Elsbethen	47°45′9″N 13°5′4″E
Feldkirch	47°15′8″N 9°37′4″E
Floridsdorf	48°15′42″N 16°24′19″E
Fritzens-Wattens	47°18′6″N 11°35′48″E
Gaisbach Wartberg	48°19′51″N 14°29′52″E
Golling-Abtenau	47°35′53″N 13°9′53″E
Göpfritz	48°43′48″N 15°23′29″E
Gries am Brenner	47°2′36″N 11°29′9″E
Götzendorf	48°1′34″N 16°34′59″E
Graz	47°04′40″N 15°24′48″E
Haag	48°05′33″N 14°35′36″E
Hohenau	
Hütteldorf	48°11′43″N 16°16′17″E
Kitzbühel	47°28′52″N 12°22′59″E
Küpfern	47°51′9″N 14°37′3″E
Landeck	47°9′8″N 10°35′11″E
Mallnitz	46°58′40″N 13°10′44″E
Marchtrenk	48°12′11″N 14°6′11″E
Mariahof	47°06′16″N 14°22′28″E
Matrei	47°7′38″N 11°27′11″E
Meidling	48°10′30″N 16°20′29″E
Mistelbach	48°33′51″N 16°33′33″E
Münster	
Parndorf	47°59′45″N 16°50′33″E
Pettneu	47°08′55″N 10°21′46″E
Pusarnitz	46°50′5″N 13°24′17″E
Riedau	48°18′31″N 13°37′37″E
Rohr	48°11′15″N 15°25′47″E
Sankt Johann im Pongau	47°20′10″N 13°11′23″E
Sankt Pölten	48°13′55″N 15°39′19″E
Sankt Veit	46°45′39″N 14°22′28″E
Schladming	47°23′38″N 13°40′43″E
Schlöglmühl	47°40′57″N 15°54′46″E
Semmering	47°37′36″N 15°48′53″E
Wien-Simmering	48°09′05″N 16°25′37″E
Steindorf	47°58′0″N 13°14′24″E
Tulln	48°19′24″N 16°2′37″E
Unterberg	47°12′50″N 11°23′32″E
Villach	46°35′42″N 13°49′55″E
Wald am Schoberpass	47°27′5″N 14°40′7″E
Wartberg an der Krems	47°59′21″N 14°7′18″E
Wegscheid	48°14′16″N 14°16′3″E
Wiener Neustadt	47°47′54″N 16°13′13″E
Wörgl	47°29′58″N 12°4′19″E
Zellerndorf	48°41′31″N 15°58′9″E
Zirl (old)	47°15′53″N 11°13′59″E
Zirl (new)	47°15′55″N 11°13′18″E

=== Central converter plants ===
In these facilities, AC from the public grid is transformed into single phase AC and fed into the traction current grid. At some facilities, power is also fed to overhead wires. Conversion may be performed mechanically or electronically.

Facility	Year of inauguration	Used technology	Maximum transmission rate	Coordinates
Auhof	1956		90 MW	48°12′00″N 16°14′12″E
Bergern	1983			48°13′3″N 15°16′17″E
Haiming	1995			47°14′47″N 10°52′27″E
Kledering	1989			48°8′21″N 16°25′56″E
Sankt Michael	1975			47°21′27″N 15°0′9″E
Timelkam	2009			47°59′36″N 13°35′56″E

=== Power plants ===
Facility	Year of inauguration	Power	Type of power plant	Coordinates
Annabrücke		20 MW	Hydroelectric power plant	46°33′40.77″N 14°28′46.08″E
Braz	1954	20 MW	Hydroelectric power plant	47°7′58.19″N 9°56′43.73″E
Enzigerboden		20 MW	Hydroelectric power plant	47°10′10.35″N 12°37′35.9″E
Fulpmes	1983	15 MW	Hydroelectric power plant	47°9′30.81″N 11°21′30.7″E
Obervellach			Hydroelectric power plant	46°56′12.69″N 13°11′30.06″E
Rützkraftwerk (Schaltposten Schönberg)			Hydroelectric power plant	47°11′59.81″N 11°23′29.72″E
Sankt Pantaleon			Hydroelectric power plant	48°13′29.41″N 14°31′50.85″E
Schneiderau			Hydroelectric power plant	47°11′50.39″N 12°36′30.35″E
Spullersee	1925	36 MW	Hydroelectric power plant	47°7′58.18″N 10°3′15.76″E
Steeg	1910		Hydroelectric power plant (only direct fed of overhead wire)	47°36′29.78″N 13°37′57.13″E
Uttendorf			Hydroelectric power plant	47°15′44.11″N 12°34′4.97″E
Weyer			Hydroelectric power plant	47°51′08″N 14°38′3.49″E

=== Points, where two powerlines for traction current crosses each other without interconnection ===
Lines	Coordinates
Sankt Johann im Pongau-Bruck/Fusch / Sankt Johann im Pongau-Selzthal	47°20′09″N 13°11′27″E
Sankt Johann im Pongau-Uttendorf / Sankt Johann im Pongau-Mallnitz	47°20′01″N 13°11′17″E
Sankt Johann im Pongau-Bruck/Fusch / Sankt Johann im Pongau-Mallnitz	47°17′47″N 13°04′24″E
Sankt Johann im Pongau-Schneiderau / Bruck/Fusch-Uttendorf	47°15′46″N 12°33′59″E
Sankt Johann im Pongau-Schneiderau / Uttendorf-Kitzbühl	47°15′45″N 12°33′59″E
Sankt Johann im Pongau-Schneiderau / Uttendorf-Kitzbühl	47°15′44″N 12°33′59″E
Bruck/Fusch-Enzingerboden / Uttendorf-Kitzbühl	47°15′45″N 12°33′55″E
Uttendorf-Enzingerboden, Schneiderau Branch / Schneiderau-Enzingerboden	47°11′49″N 12°36′28″E
Uttendorf-Enzingerboden / Schneiderau-Enzingerboden	47°10′39″N 12°37′34″E
Uttendorf-Enzingerboden / Schneiderau-Enzingerboden	47°11′38″N 12°37′00″E

== See also ==
- List of installations for 15 kV AC railway electrification in Sweden
- List of power stations in Germany
- List of power stations in Austria
- List of power stations in Switzerland
