= Electricity sector in Germany =

Electricity sector of Germany
Data
- Continuity of supply: 0.213 h (12.8 min) interruption per subscriber per year (2023)
- Installed capacity (2024): 263.4 GW
- Production (2024): 488.5 TWh
- Share of fossil energy: 37.3% (2024)
- Share of renewable energy: 62.7% (2024)
- GHG emissions from electricity generation (2024): 151.8 Mt CO_{2} [488.5 TWh × 311 g/kWh]

Tariffs and financing
- Average industrial tariff (US$/kW·h, 2013): medium: 20.60

Germany is a major electricity producer and consumer. It has the largest economy in the European Union. The country produced 488.5 TWh of electricity in 2024, with 59.4% from renewable energy sources. Germany's electrical grid is part of the synchronous grid of continental Europe.

Germany is undergoing an energy transition (Energiewende) towards renewable energy, in particular solar and wind, and away from nuclear and fossil fuels. It completed its nuclear phase-out in 2023, and is in the process of phasing out coal and fossil gas. The country plans to phase out coal by 2038 or earlier. In 2023, 31.1% of electricity was produced from wind power, 12.1% from solar power, 8.4% from biomass and the remaining 3.4% from hydropower and other renewables, for a total of 55% share of renewable energy sources in total electricity generation. In 2024, an average of 363 grams of CO_{2} was emitted per kilowatt hour of electricity consumed in Germany (compared to 433 g/kWh in 2022). Germany's emissions in 2022 represent a 40% reduction compared to 1990, the year of the German reunification. Germany once again met its target under the European Union's Effort Sharing Regulation (ESR) in 2022.

As part of its energy transition towards renewable energy, Germany's installed capacity for electric generation increased from 121 gigawatts (GW) in 2000 to 218 GW in 2019, an 80% increase, while electricity generation increased only 5% in the same period, due to the lower capacity factors of renewable energy sources.

== International electricity trade ==
In 2021, Germany exported 57,000 GWh of electricity and imported 39,600 GWh. By 2024, Germany's electricity exports were recorded at 57,400 GWh. Germany remains the second largest exporter of electricity after France, representing about 10% of electricity exports worldwide. Germany has grid interconnections with neighboring countries representing 10% of domestic capacity.

== Electricity per person and by power source ==
Germany produced electricity per person in 2008 equal to the EU-15 average (EU-15: 7,409 kWh/person); that was 77% of the OECD average (8,991 kW⋅h/person).

In 2024, Germany's electricity production was 431.7 TWh. With a population of about 83.3 million, this was 5,476 kWh per person.

Electricity per capita in Germany* (kWh/person)
	Use	Production	Export	Exp. %	Fossil	Fossil %	Nuclear	Nuc. %	Other RE*	Bio+waste	Wind	Non RE use*	RE %
2004	7,445	7,476	32	0.4%	4,603	61.5%	2,025	27.2%	654	194		6,597	11.4%
2005	7,468	7,523	55	0.7%	4,674	62.1%	1,977	26.5%	670	201		6,597	11.7%
2006	7,528	7,727	199	2.6%	4,796	62%	1,706	22.7%	856	369		6,303	16.3%
2008	7,450	7,693	243	3.3%	4,635	60%	1,804	24.2%	873	381		6,196	16.8%
2009	7,051	7,200	149	2.1%	4,314	59.9%	1,644	23.3%	288*	491	461*	5,811	17.6%
2017	6,038	6,678	640	9.5%	3,199	48.6%	873	13.2%	711	574	1,252	3,501	38.2%
* This data for Germany is extracted from the international column of a Swedish report * Other RE is waterpower, solar and geothermal electricity and wind power until 2008 * Non RE use = use – production of renewable electricity * RE % = (production of RE / use) * 100% Note: European Union calculates the share of renewable energies in gross electrical consumption.

== Mode of production ==
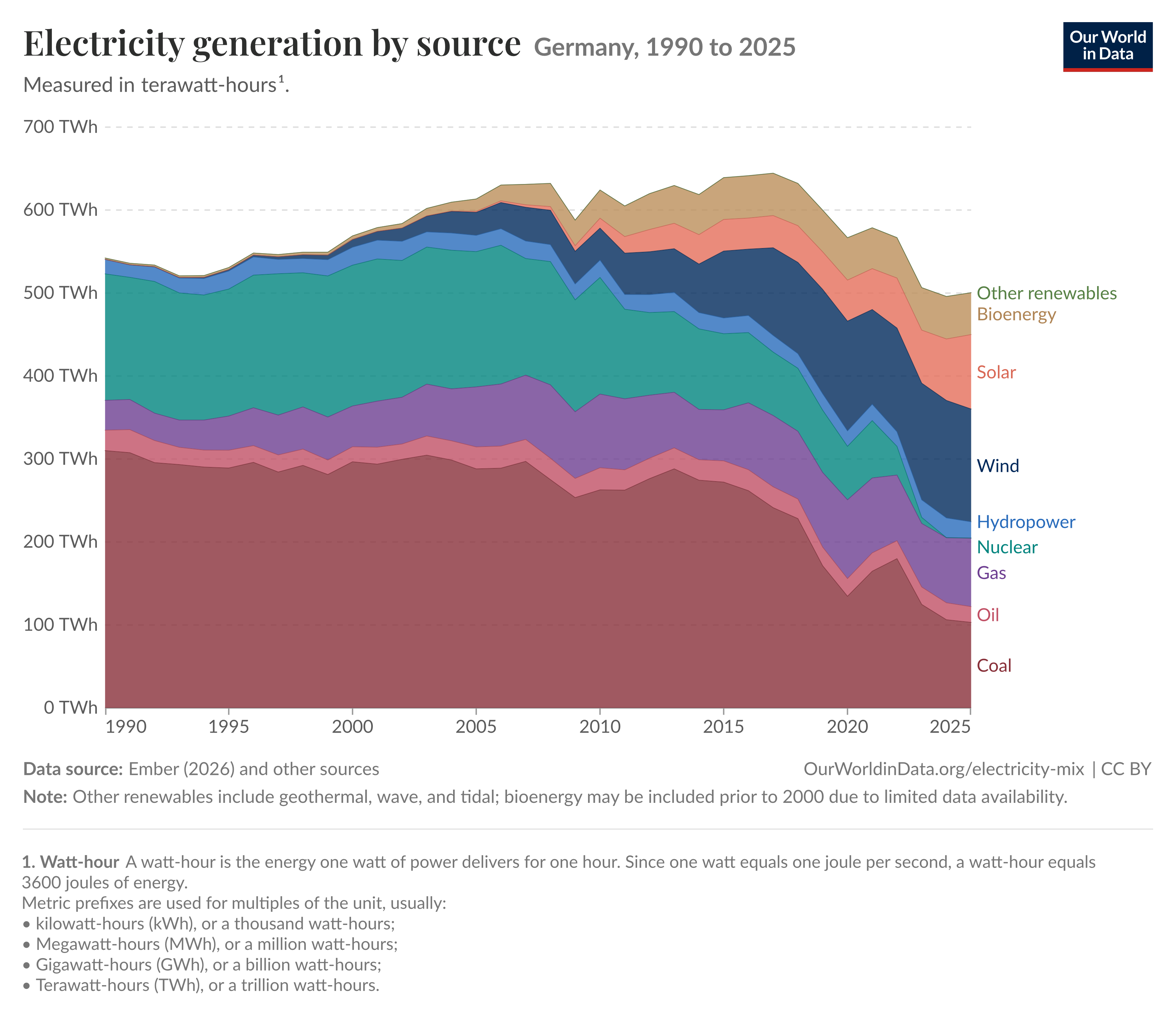

=== Coal ===
In 2008, power from coal supplied 291 TWh or 46% of Germany's overall production of 631 TWh, but this dropped to 118 TWh (24%) in 2020. In 2010 Germany was still one of the world's largest consumers of coal at 4th place behind China (2,733 TWh), USA (2,133 TWh) and India (569 TWh). By 2019 it had fallen to 8th, behind smaller countries such as South Korea and South Africa.

Germany has shut its last hardcoal mine in December 2018. Germany still has three large open pit mines for lignite: Garzweiler surface mine near Köln, the Lausitzer Braunkohlerevier and the Oberlausitzer Bergbaurevier both near the Polish border.

In January 2019 the German Commission on Growth, Structural Change and Employment initiated Germany's plans to entirely phase out and shut down the 84 remaining coal-fired plants on its territory by 2038. This is called Kohleausstieg (Coal phase-out).

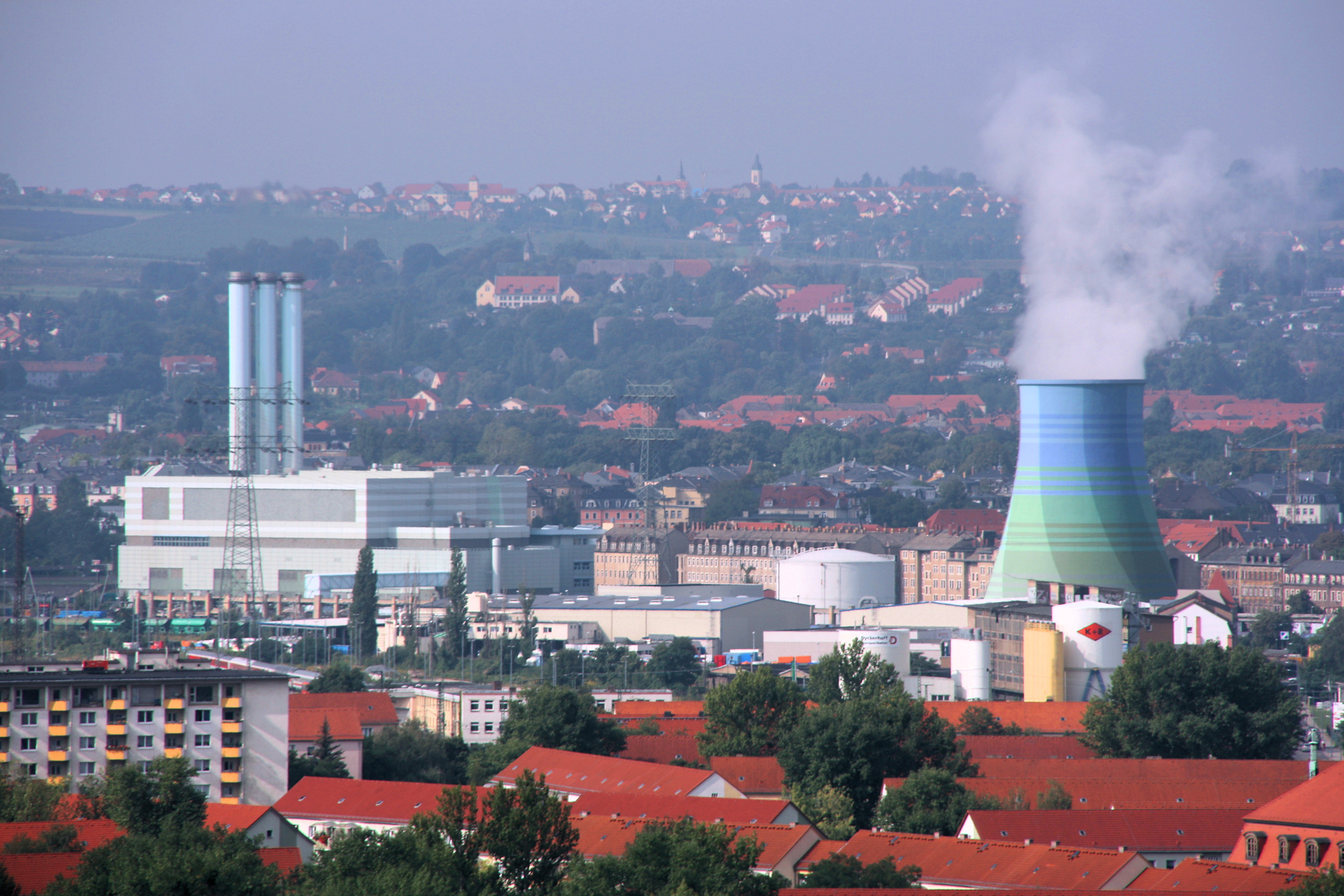
Gas power station Nossener Brücke in Dresden

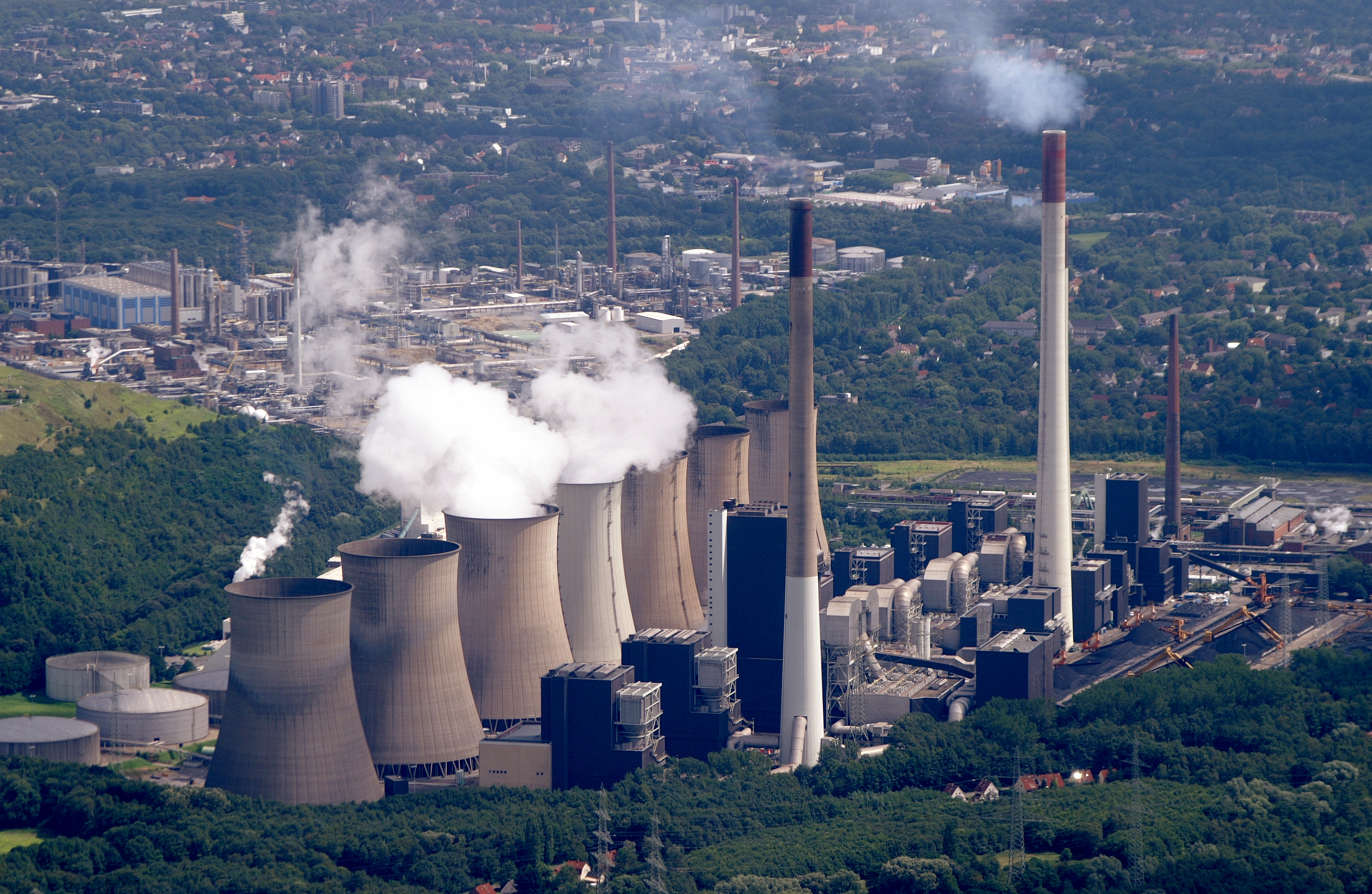
Coal-fired power plant Scholven

=== Nuclear power ===
In 1969, Siemens and AEG founded Kraftwerk Union AG (KWU). In 1977, Siemens got 100% of the shares. KWU was the only significant nuclear constructor in Germany. In 2000, the nuclear share was 3% of Siemens' business. In 2001, Siemens Nuclear Power (SNP), the nuclear division of Siemens, merged with Framatome to form the nuclear technology company Framatome ANP. In March 2011, after the Fukushima accident had begun, Siemens sold its stake in Areva NP to Areva.

The installed nuclear power capacity in Germany was 20 GW in 2008 and 21 GW in 2004. The production of nuclear power was 148 TWh in 2008 (sixth top by 5.4% of world total) and 167 TWh in 2004 (fourth top by 6.1% of world total).

In 2009, nuclear power production saw a 19% reduction compared to 2004, and its share had declined smoothly over time from 27% to 23%. The share of renewable and electricity increased as well as fossil fuels such as natural gas and lignite burning, substituting for nuclear power.

In 2011, following the Fukushima nuclear accident, the second Merkel cabinet established a firm phase-out policy for nuclear power (Atomausstieg). That same year, eight nuclear reactors were permanently shut down. These included Unterweser, Krümmel, Biblis A and B, Philippsburg 1, Isar 1, Neckarwestheim 1, and Brunsbüttel.

While the remaining nine reactors were scheduled for decommissioning by the end of 2022, the Russian invasion of Ukraine and the subsequent energy crisis led to a brief policy adjustment. To mitigate potential energy shortages caused by the loss of Russian gas supplies, the final three units—Isar 2, Emsland, and Neckarwestheim 2—remained operational until 15 April 2023, when they were officially disconnected from the grid.

=== Renewable electricity ===
Germany renewable electricity production by source, 1990-2023

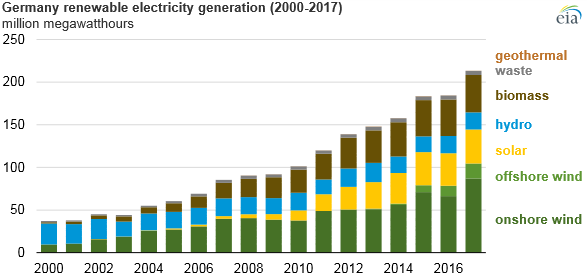
German renewable energy production by source, 2000–2017

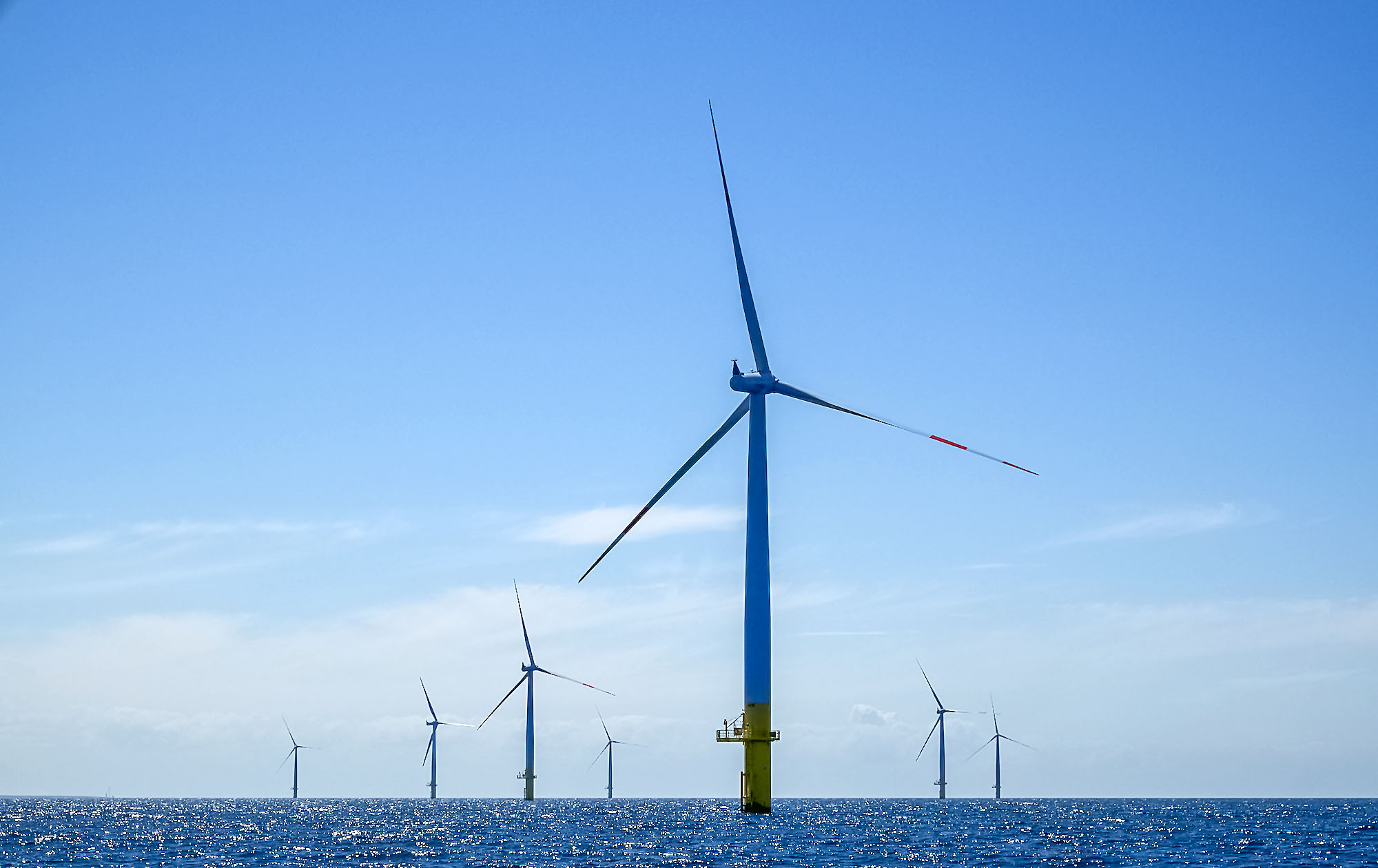
Wind turbines in Baltic Sea in 2013

Germany has been described as "the world's first major renewable energy economy." The sector is primarily based on wind, solar, and biomass. Germany held the world's largest installed photovoltaic capacity until 2014, and by 2016, it ranked third globally with 40 GW. Similarly, wind power capacity grew to 50 GW by 2016, including over 4 GW from offshore installations. Expansion accelerated significantly in the following decade; by the beginning of 2026, installed solar capacity reached 100 GW, while total wind capacity climbed to 73 GW, driven by a record expansion in both onshore and offshore sectors.

Former Chancellor Angela Merkel, along with a vast majority of her compatriots, maintained that "as the first big industrialized nation, we can achieve such a transformation toward efficient and renewable energies, with all the opportunities that brings for exports, developing new technologies and jobs." Following this vision, the share of renewable electricity in gross electricity consumption rose from 3.4% in 1990 to exceed 10% by 2005, 30% by 2015, and 50% by 2023. By the end of 2024, renewable sources accounted for approximately 56% of Germany's electricity generation. However, the transition in the transport and heating sectors remained considerably slower than in the power sector.

By the end of 2015, there were more than 23,000 wind turbines and 1.4 million solar PV systems distributed across Germany. Following a decade of accelerated expansion, these numbers grew significantly; by early 2026, the country hosted approximately 30,000 onshore wind turbines and over 4 million solar PV systems, the latter driven by a surge in residential installations and commercial solar farms. Employment in the sector has followed a similar upward trajectory. From 160,500 jobs in 2004 and around 370,000 in 2010, the renewable energy workforce expanded to over 450,000 people by 2025, particularly within small and medium-sized enterprises. Historically, about two-thirds of these jobs were attributed to the Renewable Energy Sources Act.

Germany's federal government is working to increase renewable energy commercialization, with a particular focus on offshore wind farms. A major challenge is the development of sufficient network capacities for transmitting the power generated in the North Sea to the large industrial consumers in southern parts of the country. Germany's energy transition, the Energiewende, designates a significant change in energy policy from 2011. The term encompasses a reorientation of policy from demand to supply and a shift from centralized to distributed generation (for example, producing heat and power in very small cogeneration units), which should replace overproduction and avoidable energy consumption with energy-saving measures and increased efficiency. At the end of 2020, Germany had 2.3 GWh of home battery storage, often in conjunction with solar panels, and home storage increased to 15.4 GWh at the end of 2024 while large-scale storage was 2.3 GWh. 72 GW of Germany's 100 GW of solar power, and 47 GW (2/3) of wind power, received a fixed feed-in tariff, and had thus little incentive to self-curtail during surplus power when grid price is zero or below.

Large-scale batteries can take 2 years to build, while a 30 MW battery can take a year. In 2024, Germany had more than 400 hours of negative electricity prices, supplying low cost input for storage.

== Electricity prices ==
German electricity prices in 2020 were 31.47 euro cents per kW⋅h for residential customers (an increase of 126% since 2000), and 17.8 euro cents per kW⋅h for non-residential customers (21.8 with taxes). During and after the Global energy crisis (2021–2023), gas prices and electricity prices increased significantly.

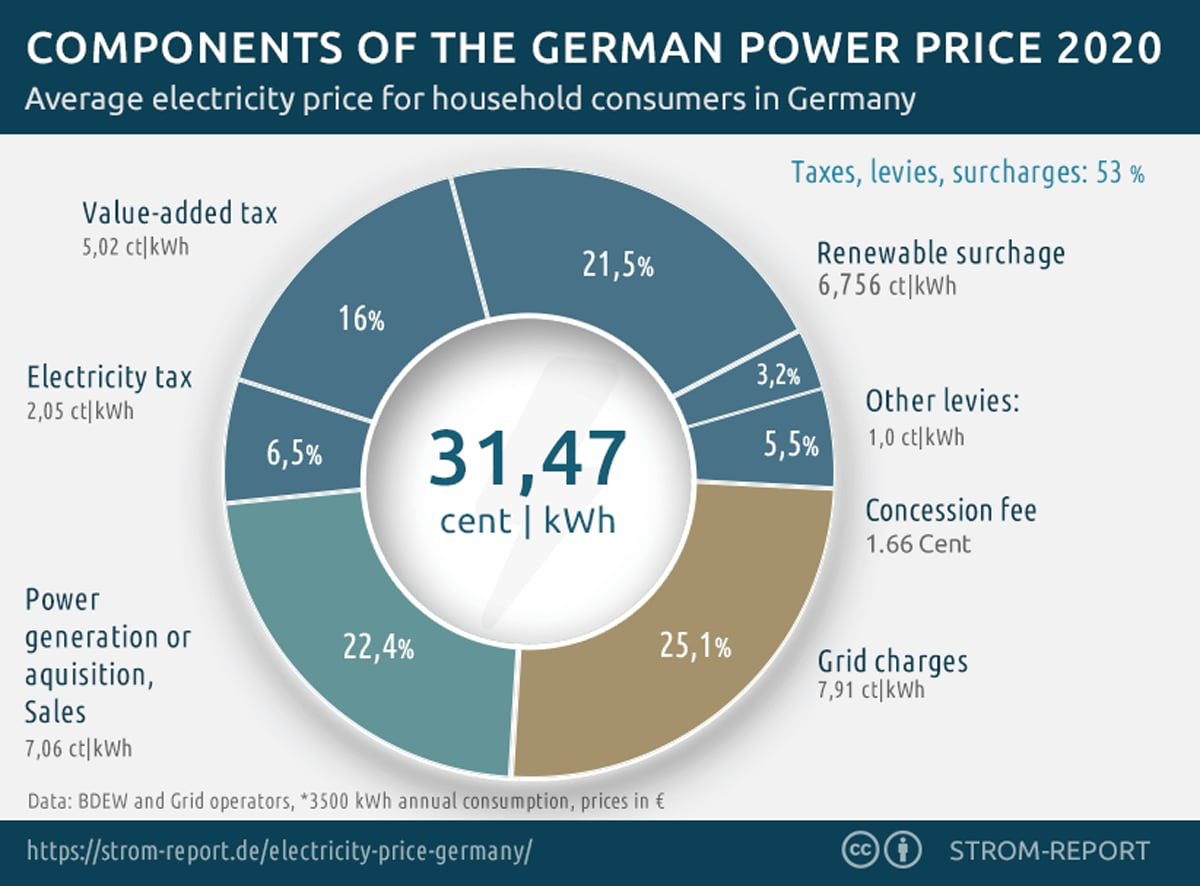
Components of the German Electricity Price for Households (2020) Source (dead link)

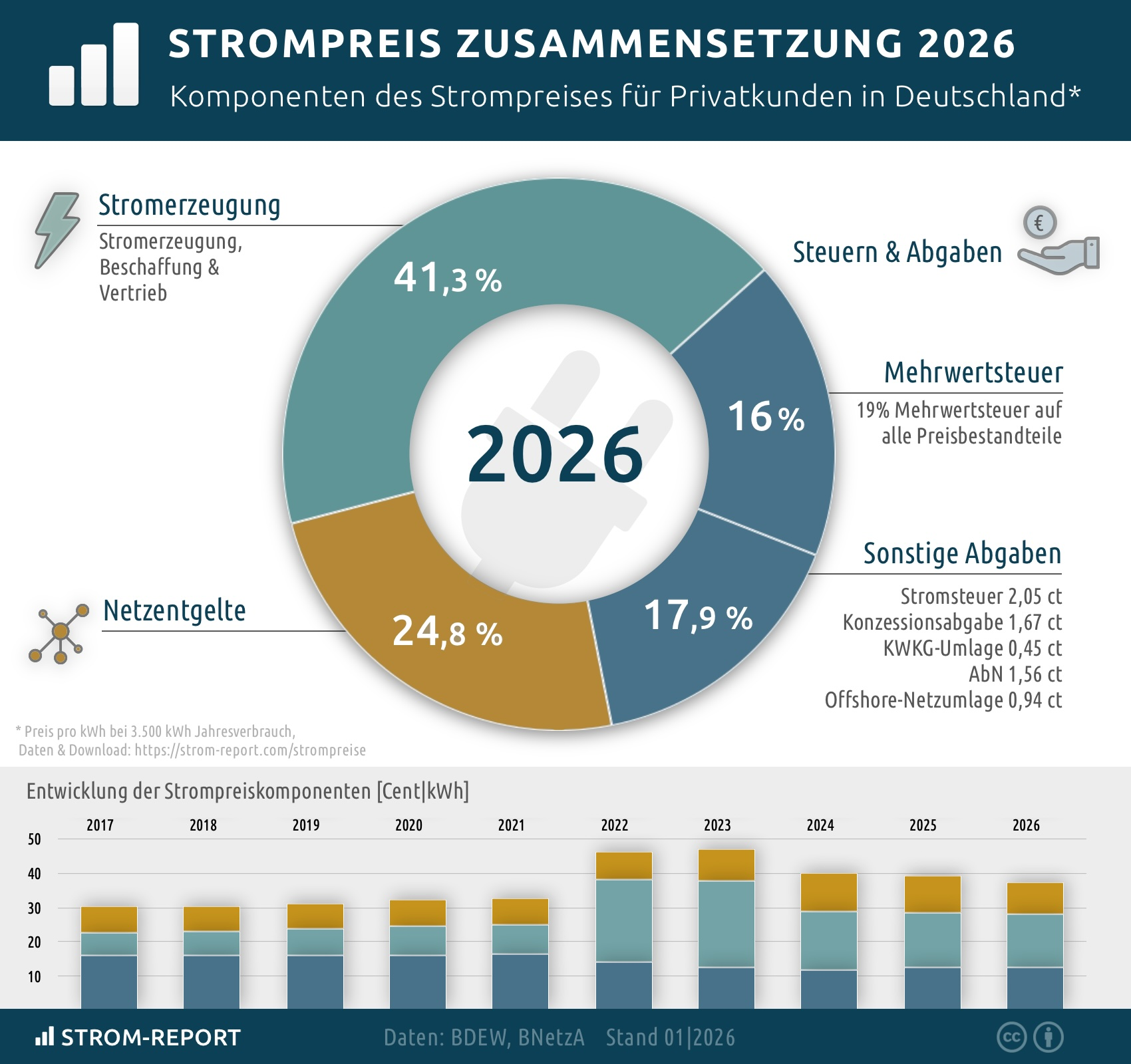
Components of the German Electricity Price for Households (March 2025)

German households and small businesses have paid some of the highest electricity price in Europe for many years in a row. By 2025, 32% of the power price consists of taxes and duties, 27,5 % grid fees and 40,5 % electricity generation.

Hours with negative price
Year	Hours
2020	298
2021	139
2022	69
2023	301
2024	459
2025	573

== Transmission network ==
Electrical power transmission grid in 2022 with 380 kV (red) 220 kV (green) and 110 kV (blue) AC power lines

Grid owners included, in 2008, RWE, EnBW, Vattenfall and E.ON. According to the European Commission the electricity producers should not own the electricity grid to ensure open competition. The European Commission accused E.ON of the misuse of markets in February 2008. Consequently, E.ON sold its share of the network. As of July 2016 the four German TSOs are:

- 50Hertz Transmission GmbH (owned by Elia, formerly owned by Vattenfall)
- Amprion GmbH (RWE)
- Tennet TSO GmbH (owned by TenneT, formerly owned by E.ON)
- TransnetBW (renamed from EnBW Transportnetze AG and a 100% subsidiary of EnBW)

In Germany, there also exists a single-phase AC grid operated at 16.7 Hz to supply power to rail transport, see list of installations for 15 kV AC railway electrification in Germany, Austria and Switzerland.

=== Special features of German transmission network ===
There are some special features in the transmission network of Germany. Also they have no direct influence on operation, they are remarkable under technical viewpoints.

==== Garland-type communication cables ====
Many powerlines in Baden-Württemberg, which were built by Energie-Versorgung-Schwaben (EVS, now part of EnBW) are equipped with a communication cable, which hangs like a garland on the ground conductor. Some of these lines have also a second communication cable hanging on an auxiliary wire, which is usually fixed on the pinnacle of the pylon below the ground conductor. Such devices are usually installed on lines with voltages of 110 kV and more, but there existed also a 20 kV-line near Eberdingen, which had a communication cable fixed like a garland on a conductor rope. Although communication cables fixed like a garland where replaced in the last decades by free-hanging communication cables many of these devices are still in use. If a downlink of the communication cable from the suspension level to the ground is necessary, which is for example the case at amplifier stations, lines built by former Energie-Versorgung-Schwaben (EVS) use therefore a cable in the centre of the tower strung by a pond instead of a cable fixed at the tower structure. This construction type can be found as well on lines using garland-type communication cables as on lines using freely span communication cables.

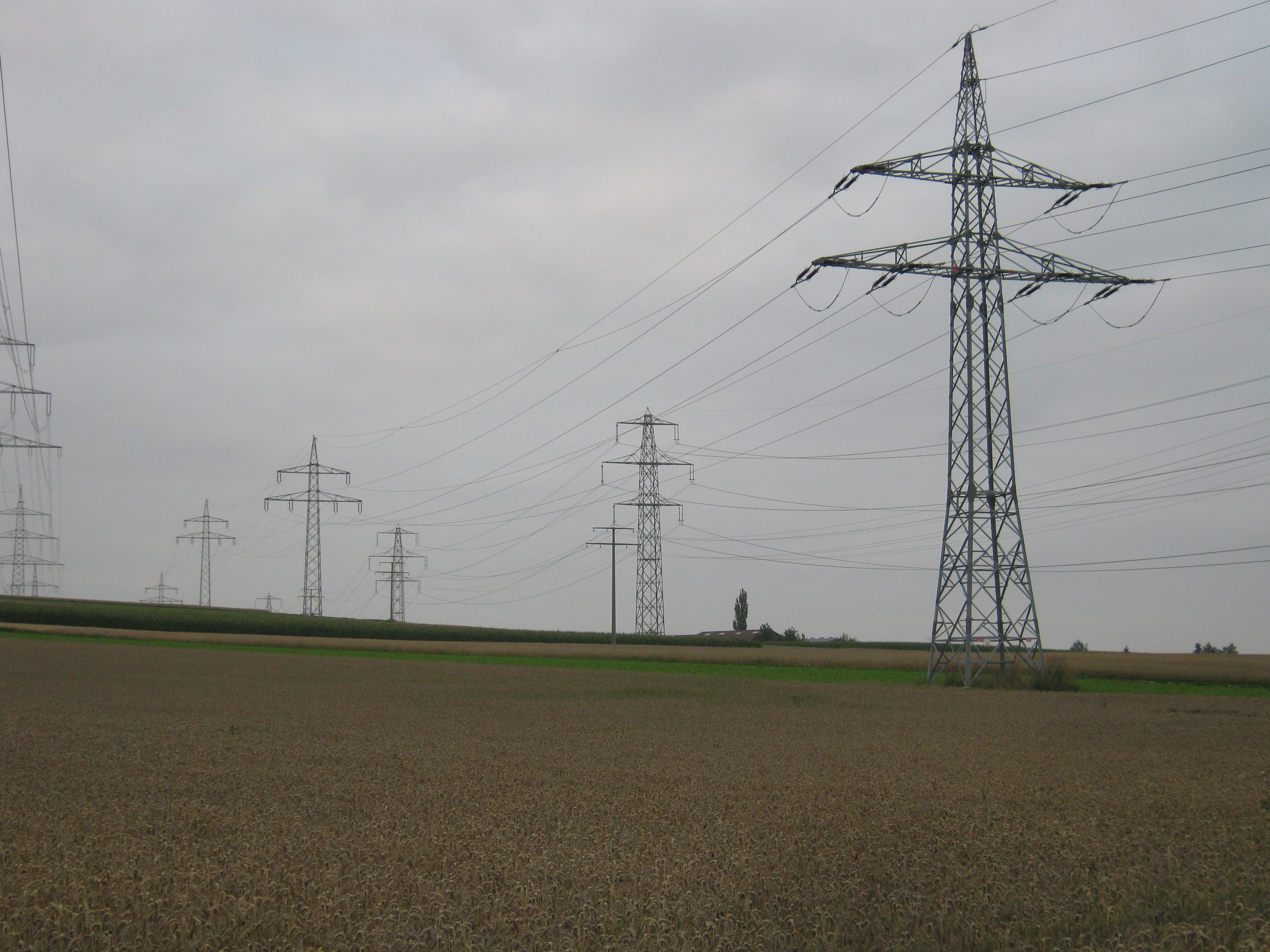
A 110 kV-line with a communication cable hanging like a garland on the ground conductor

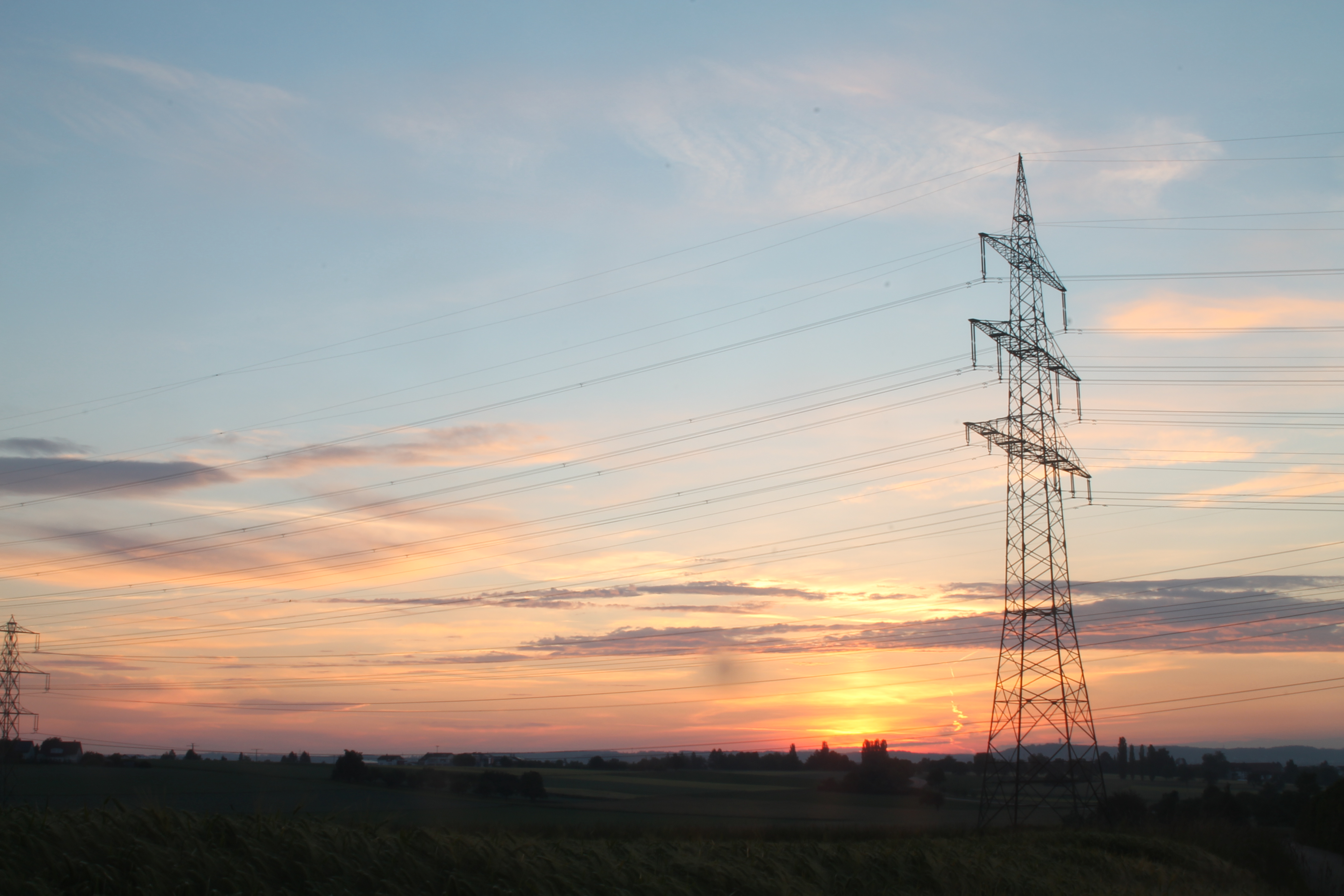
380 kV/110 kV-line Pulverdingen-Oberjettingen with two communication cables hanging like garlands on ropes above the power conductors

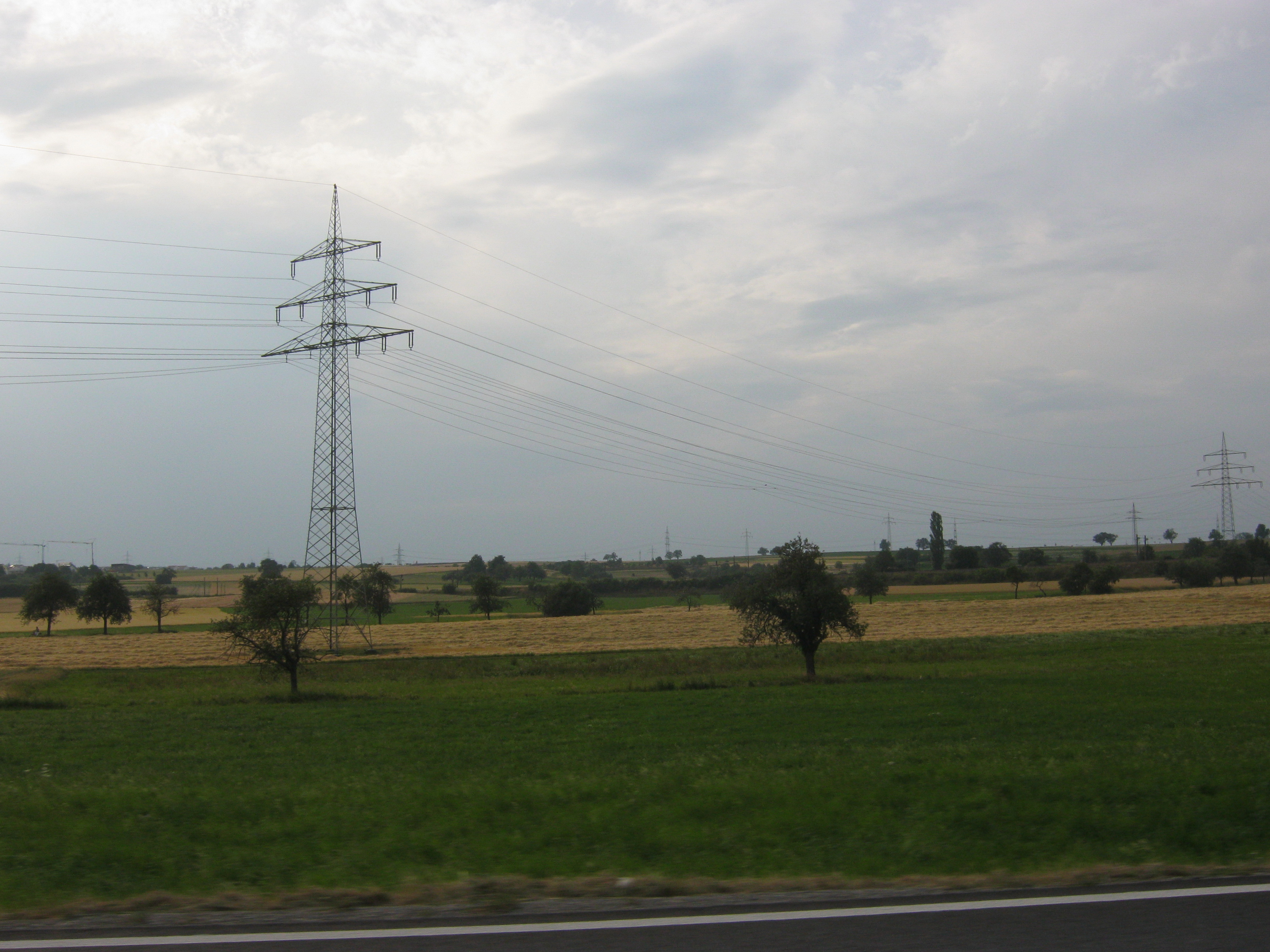
A 110 kV-line with two communication cables fixed like garlands on grounded ropes on a half of the lowest crossbar

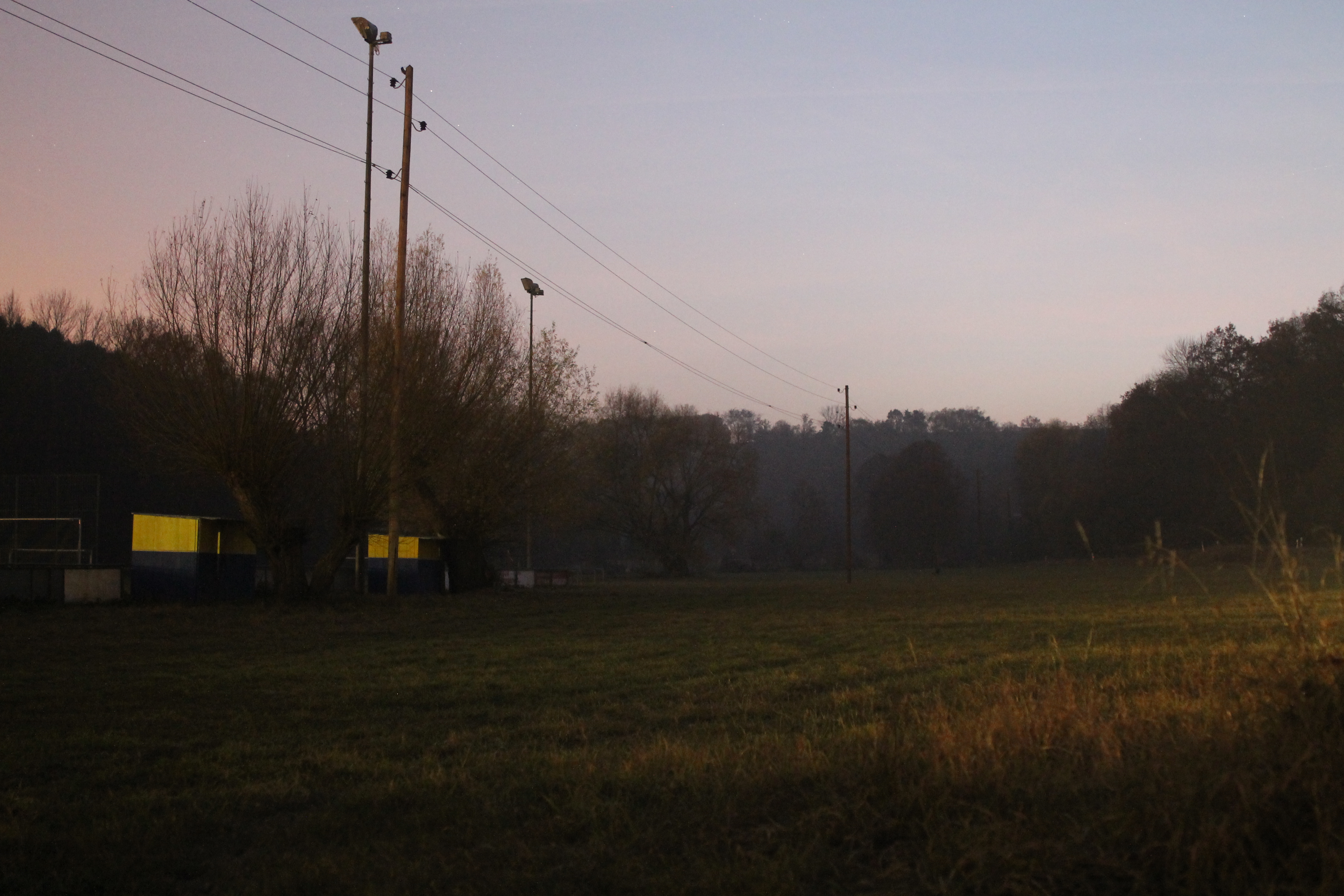
20 kV-line near Eberdingen with communication cable hanging like a garland on the lowest conductor

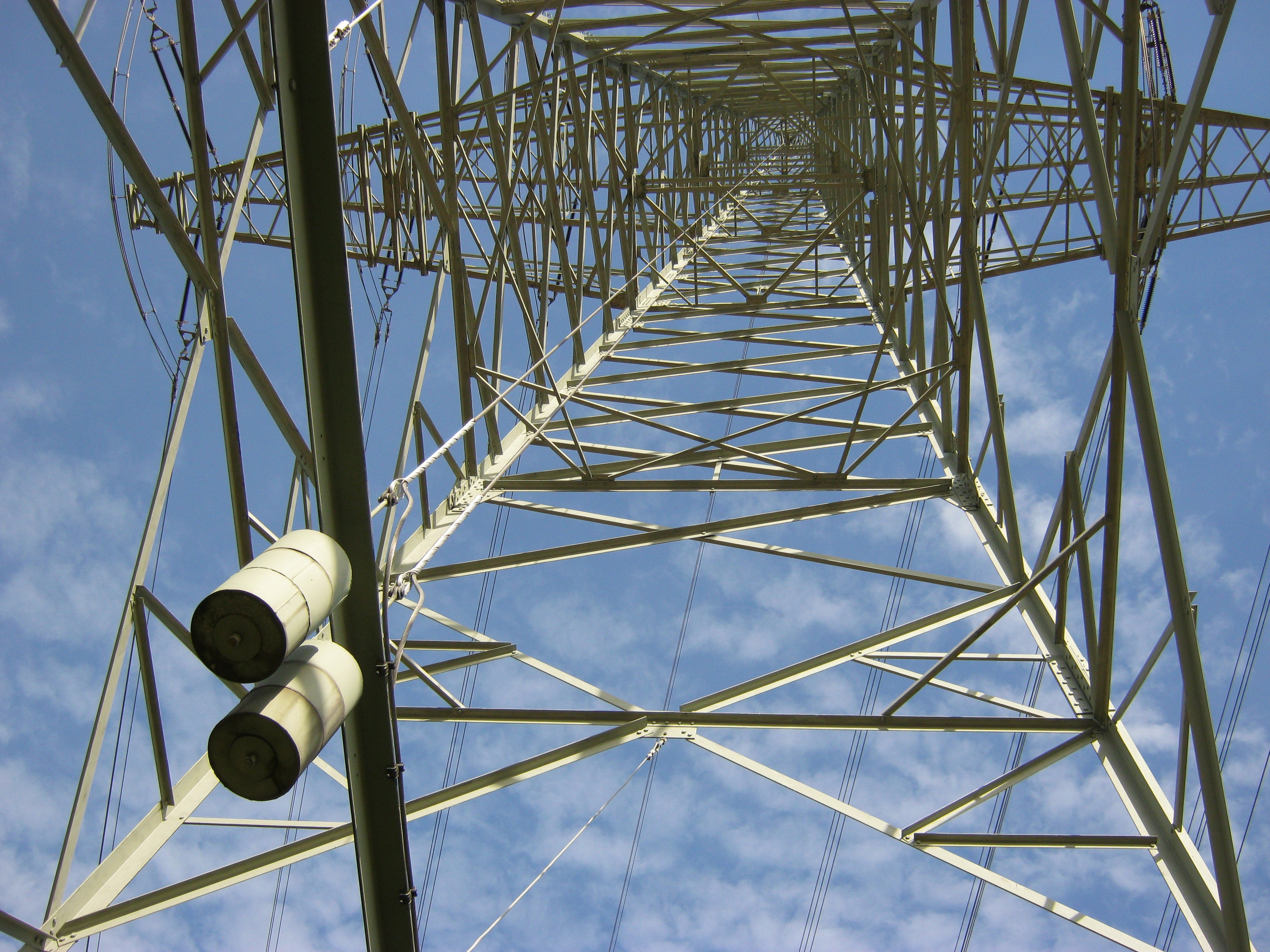
Communication cable running down in the centre of the pylon

==== Powerline crossings of Elbe river near Stade ====
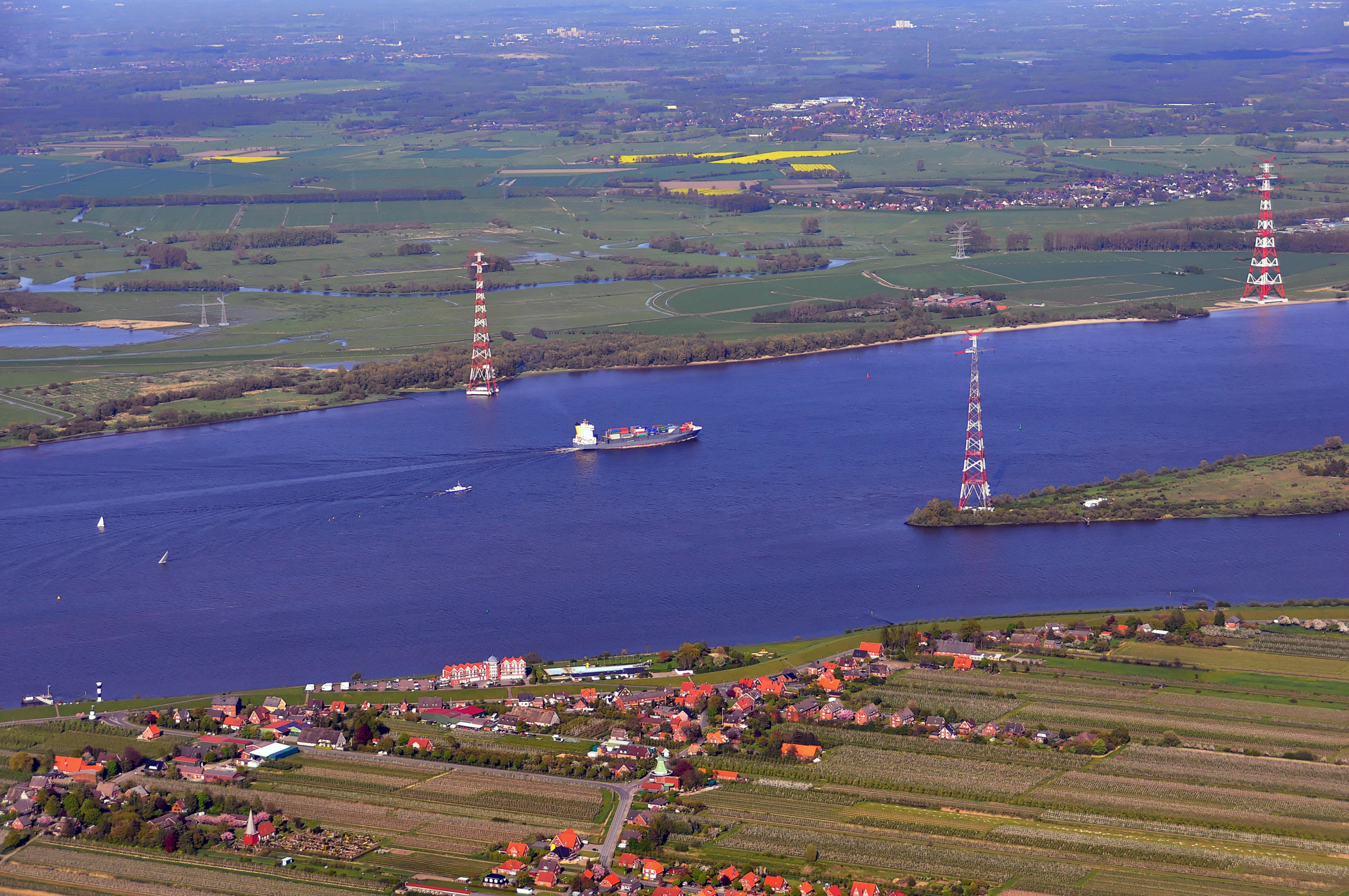
Elbe Crossing 1 (center) and 2 (right, one mast only)

There are two powerline crossings of the Elbe river near Stade, whose pylons are among the tallest structures in Europe.

Elbe Crossing 1 is a group of masts providing an overhead crossing of a 220 kV three-phase alternating current electric powerline across the River Elbe. Constructed between 1959 and 1962 as part of the line from Stade to Hamburg north, it consists of four masts. Each of the two portal masts is a guyed mast 50 metres (160 ft) in height with a crossbeam at a height of 33 metres (108 ft). One of these masts stands on the Schleswig-Holstein bank of the Elbe and the other on the Lower Saxony bank. Two identical carrying masts 189 metres (620 ft) in height, each weighing 330 tonnes (320 long tons; 360 short tons), ensure the necessary passage height of 75 metres (246 ft) over the Elbe. One stands on the island of Lühesand, the other in the Buhnenfeld on the Schleswig-Holstein side.

Because of the swampy terrain, each mast's foundation is built on pilings driven into the ground. The Lühesand portal mast rests on 41 pilings and the one on the Buhnenfeld on 57. In contrast to the usual construction of such lattice-steel transmission towers, the direction of the line passes diagonally over the square ground cross section of the pylon, resulting in savings in material. The two crossbeams for the admission of the six conductor cables are at a height of 166 metres (545 ft) and 179 metres (587 ft). The mast on the Buhnenfeld bears at a height of 30 metres (98 ft) a radar facility belonging to the Water and Navigation Office of the Port of Hamburg. Each portal mast has stairs and gangways for maintenance of flight safety beacons, and has a hoist for heavy loads.

Elbe Crossing 2 is a group of transmission towers providing overhead lines for four 380 kV three-phase alternating current (AC) circuits across the German river Elbe. It was constructed between 1976 and 1978 to supplement Elbe Crossing 1, and consists of four towers:

- A 76-metre-tall anchor pylon located in Lower Saxony, on the Elbe's southern banks.
- Two carrying pylons, each 227 metres (745 ft) tall. One is located on the island of Lühesand and the other is near Hetlingen in Schleswig-Holstein, on the northern shore.

These pylons are the tallest pylons in Europe and the sixth tallest of the world. They stand on 95 piers because of the unfavorable building ground. The base of each pylon measures 45 by 45 metres (148 ft × 148 ft) and each pylon weighs 980 tonnes (960 long tons; 1,080 short tons). Crossbeams, which hold up the power cables, are located at heights of 172 (564), 190 (620) and 208 metres (682 ft). The crossbeams span 56 metres or 184 feet (lowest crossbeam), 72 metres or 236 feet (middle crossbeam) and 57 metres or 187 feet (highest crossbeam). Each pylon has a self-propelled climbing elevator for maintenance of the aircraft warning lights; each elevator runs inside a steel tube in the centre of the mast, around which there is a spiral staircase.

- A 62-metre-tall (203 ft) anchor pylon on the Schleswig-Holstein side.

The enormous height of the two carrying pylons ensures that the passage height requirement of 75 metres (246 ft) over the Elbe demanded by German authorities is met. The height requirement ensures that large ships are able to enter Hamburg's deep-water port.

==== Electricity pylons ====
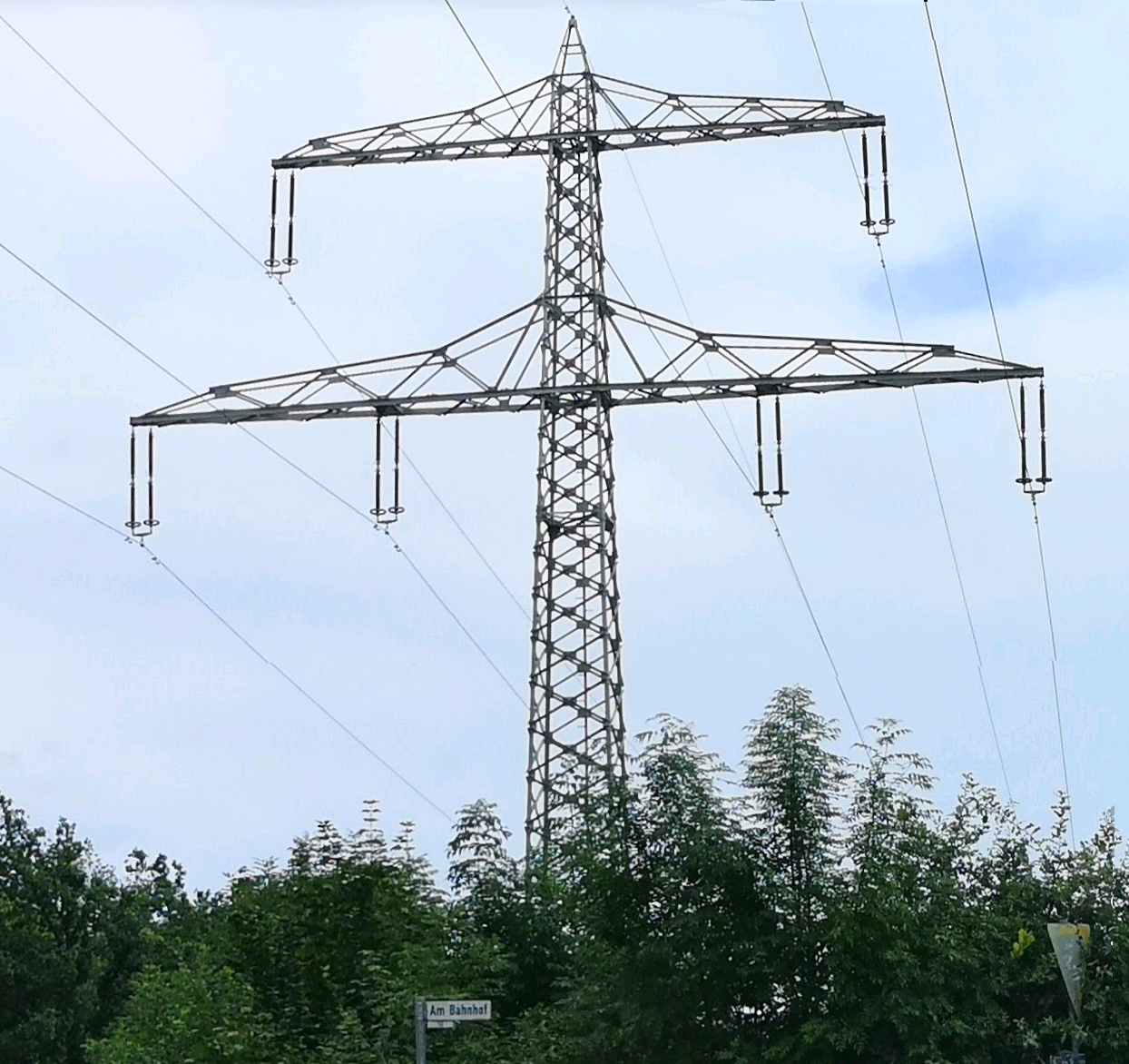
Donaumast pylon

Unlike in most other countries, there are only few three-level or delta pylons. Instead, two-level lattice pylons called de:Donaumast are widely used. These carry two cables on the upper and four cables on the lower crossarm. Particularly in eastern Germany one-level pylons were used too. Power lines with less than 100 kV mostly run underground today. Unlike in the US and many other countries, roadside medium-voltage overhead lines do not exist.

==== Other features ====
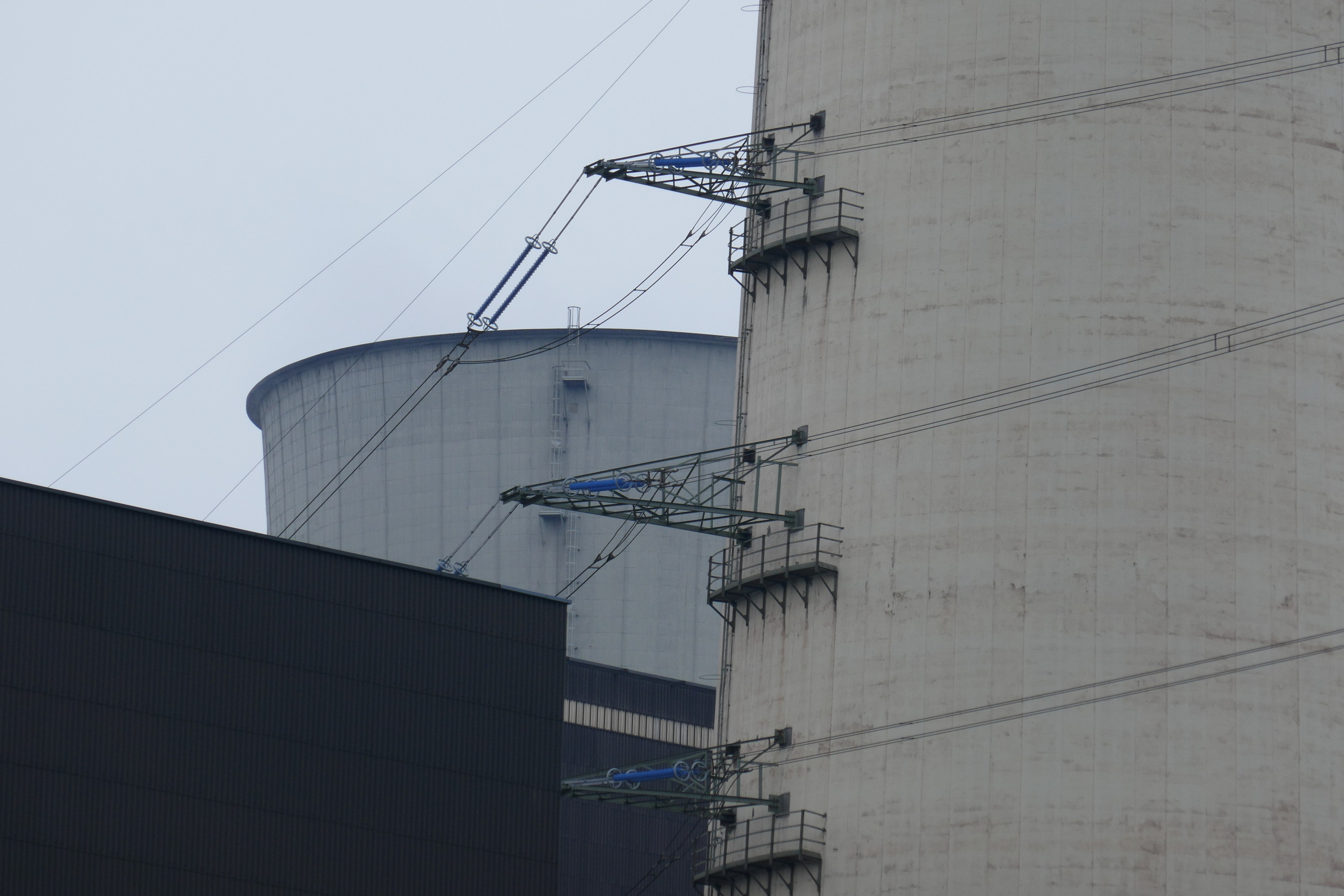
Booms on cooling tower of Scholven Power Station carrying a 220 kV-circuit leaving the power station

A 302 metres tall cooling tower of Scholven Power Station at Gelsenkirchen, which is used by four units of these thermal power station is equipped with three booms carrying the conductors of a 220 kV-circuit leaving one of these units.

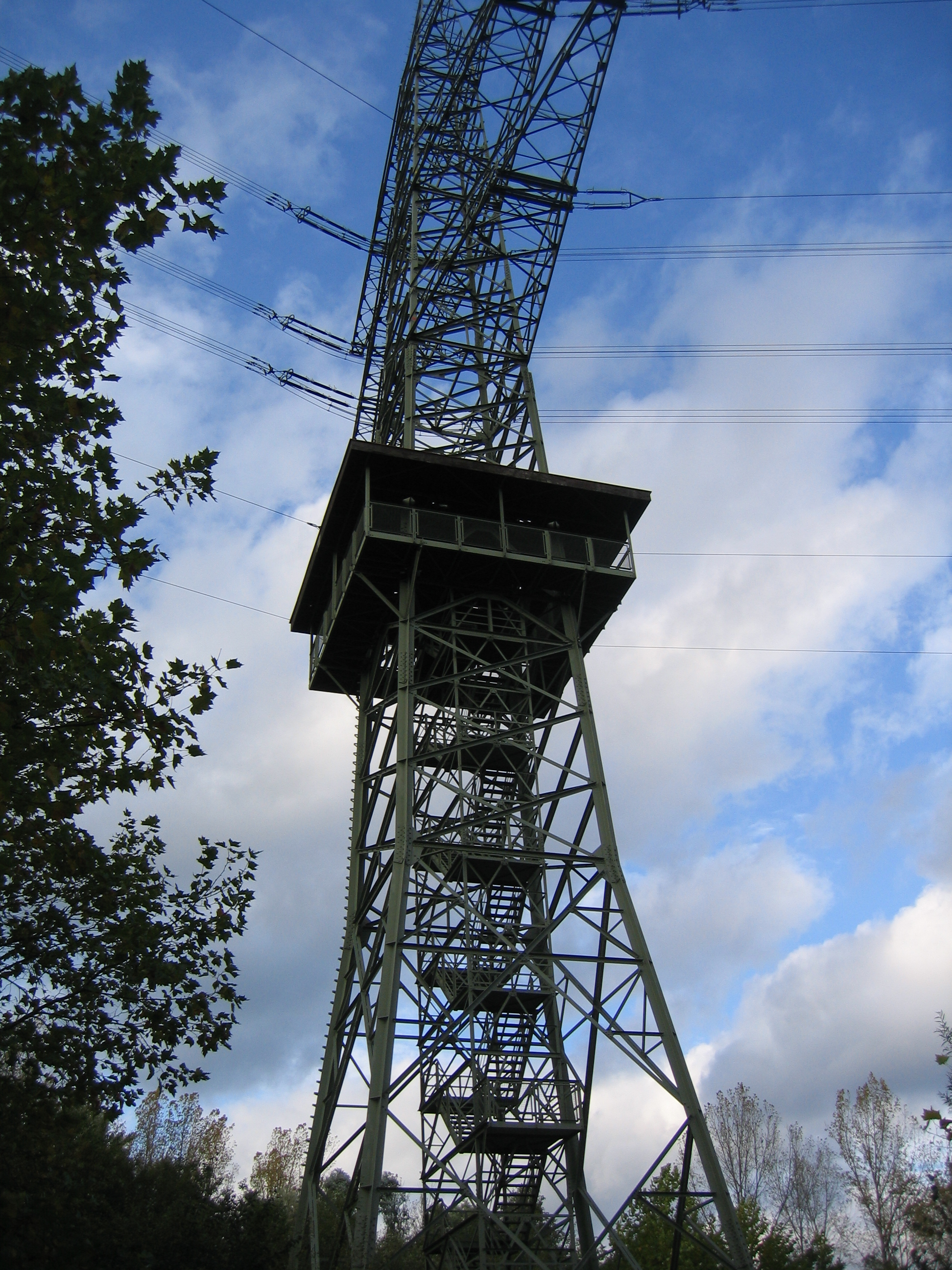
Pylon with observation platform near Hürth (2005)

From 1977 to 2010 a 74.84 metres high strainer of powerline Oberzier-Niedersechtem was equipped with a public observation deck in a height of 27 metres, which was accessible by a staircase. After too much vandalism occurred, which endangered also the integrity of the pylon, this observation deck was removed.

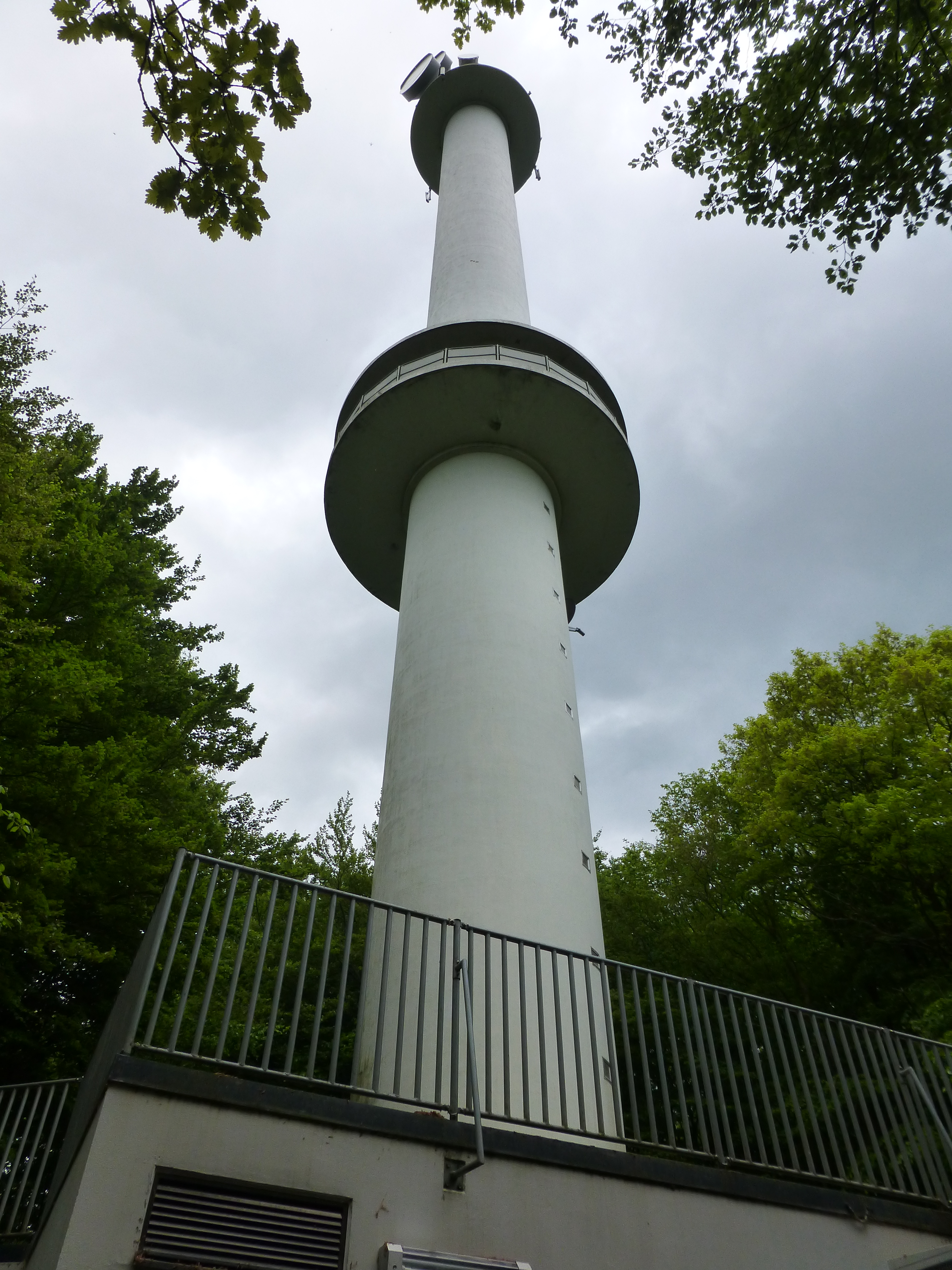
Radio relay tower on Goose Neck

As in many other countries, power companies in Germany use radio relay links for data transmissions. In most cases the antennas used therefore are installed on lattice towers, but at some sites concrete towers are used for this purpose. The 87 metres tall radio relay tower on Goose Neck mountain (German: Gänsehals) near Bell is the only of these towers equipped with a public observation deck. It is situated in a height of 24 metres and accessible by a staircase.

== Summary table ==
2023 Electricity in Germany - Generation and consumption
Source	Generation (GWh)		Capacity (MW)		Capacity factor
Total	536,428	100.0%	275,658	100.0%	22.2%
Fossil fuels	263,014	49.0%	99,241	36.0%	30.3%
Renewables	269,473	50.2%	165,805	60.1%	18.6%
Wind	139,109	25.9%	69,459	25.2%	22.9%
Solar	59,702	11.1%	81,739	29.7%	8.3%
Biomass and waste	50,574	9.4%	9,95	3.6%	58.0%
Hydroelectricity	19,958	3.7%	4,607	1.7%	49.5%
Geothermal	130	0.02%	50	0.02%	29.7%
Nuclear	6,723	1.3%	4,055	1.5%	18.9%
Hydroelectric pumped storage	-2,782	-0.5%	6,557	2.4%	-4.8%
Consumption*	519,691	96.9%			
Exports	60,316	11.2%			
Imports	69,353	12.9%			
Distribution losses	25,774	4.8%			
*Consumption = Generation - Exports + Imports - Distribution losses

2021 Electricity in Germany - Generation and consumption
Source	Generation (GWh)		Capacity (MW)	
Total	557,144	100.0%	250,385	100.0%
Fossil fuels	260,790	46.8%	98,311	39.3%
Renewables	233,000	41.8%	137,762	55.0%
Wind	113,624	20.4%	63,865	25.5%
Solar	49,992	9.0%	58,728	23.5%
Biomass and waste	49,883	9.0%	10,439	4.2%
Hydroelectricity	19,252	3.5%	6,199	2.5%
Geothermal	249	0.04%	46	0.02%
Nuclear	65,441	11.7%	8,113	3.2%
Hydroelectric pumped storage	-2,087	-0.4%	6,199	2.5%
Consumption*	511,660	91.8%		
Exports	70,237	12.6%		
Imports	51,336	9.2%		
Distribution losses	26,582	4.8%		
*Consumption = Generation - Exports + Imports - Distribution losses

== See also ==
- Energy in Germany
