= Lühesand =

Coordinates: 53°36′N 9°35′E

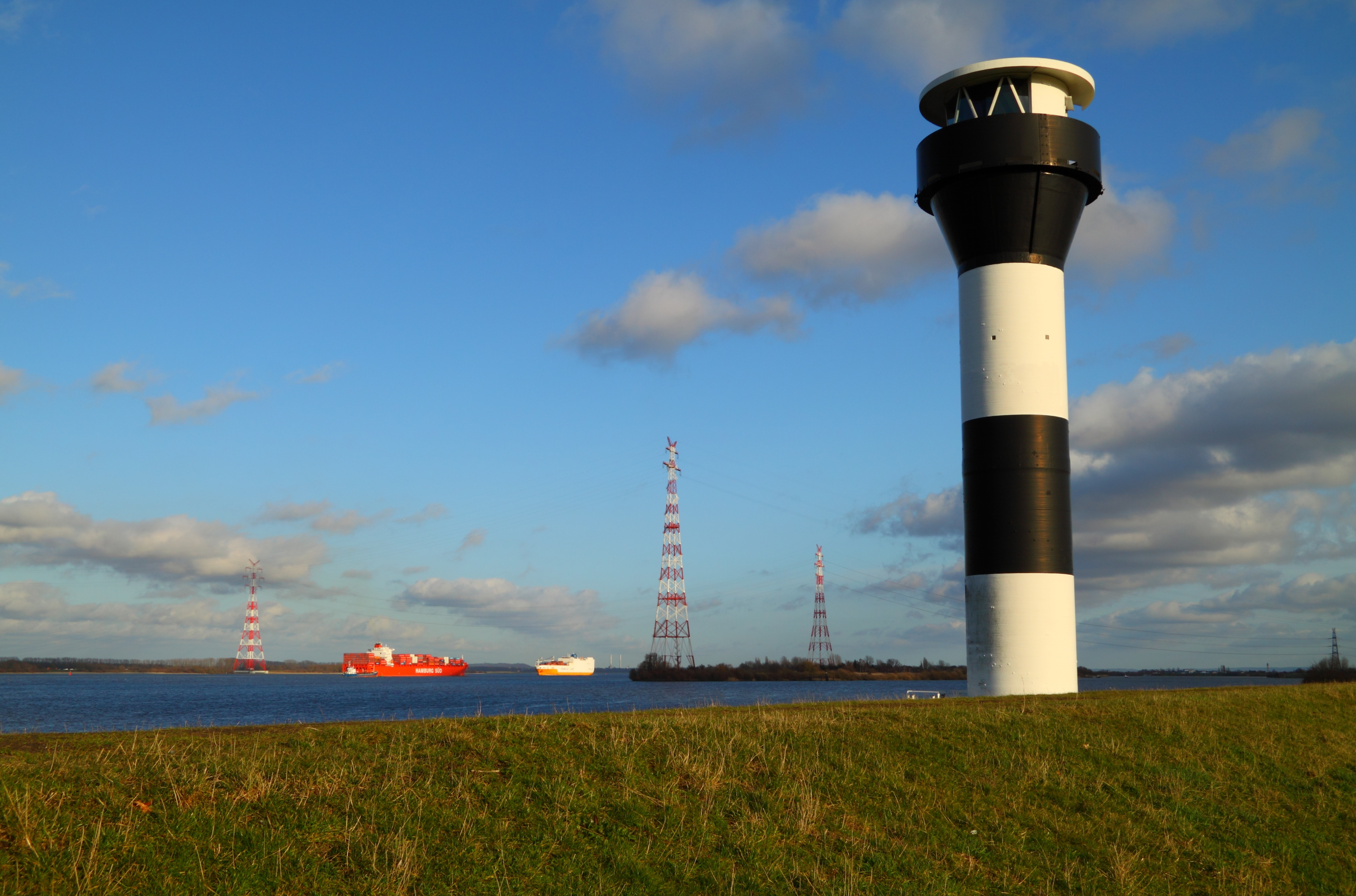
View of the Elbe in Hollern-Twielenfleth. The Elbe crossing pylons on Lühesand are the two on the right.

Lühesand is a small island of 1.24 square kilometres (0.48 sq mi) in the river Elbe (here the Lower Elbe), 8 kilometres (5.0 mi) east of Stade in Lower Saxony, Germany. The island, named after the easterly located mouth of the Lühe, forms part of Hollern-Twielenfleth (northwestern two thirds of the island) and Steinkirchen (southeastern third). It can only be reached by ferry from Grünendeich's westerly exclave Sandhörn and contains a large camping site, on which many continuous campers stay. The southern carrying pylons of Elbe Crossing 1 and Elbe Crossing 2 have been located on Lühesand.
