= Murjek =

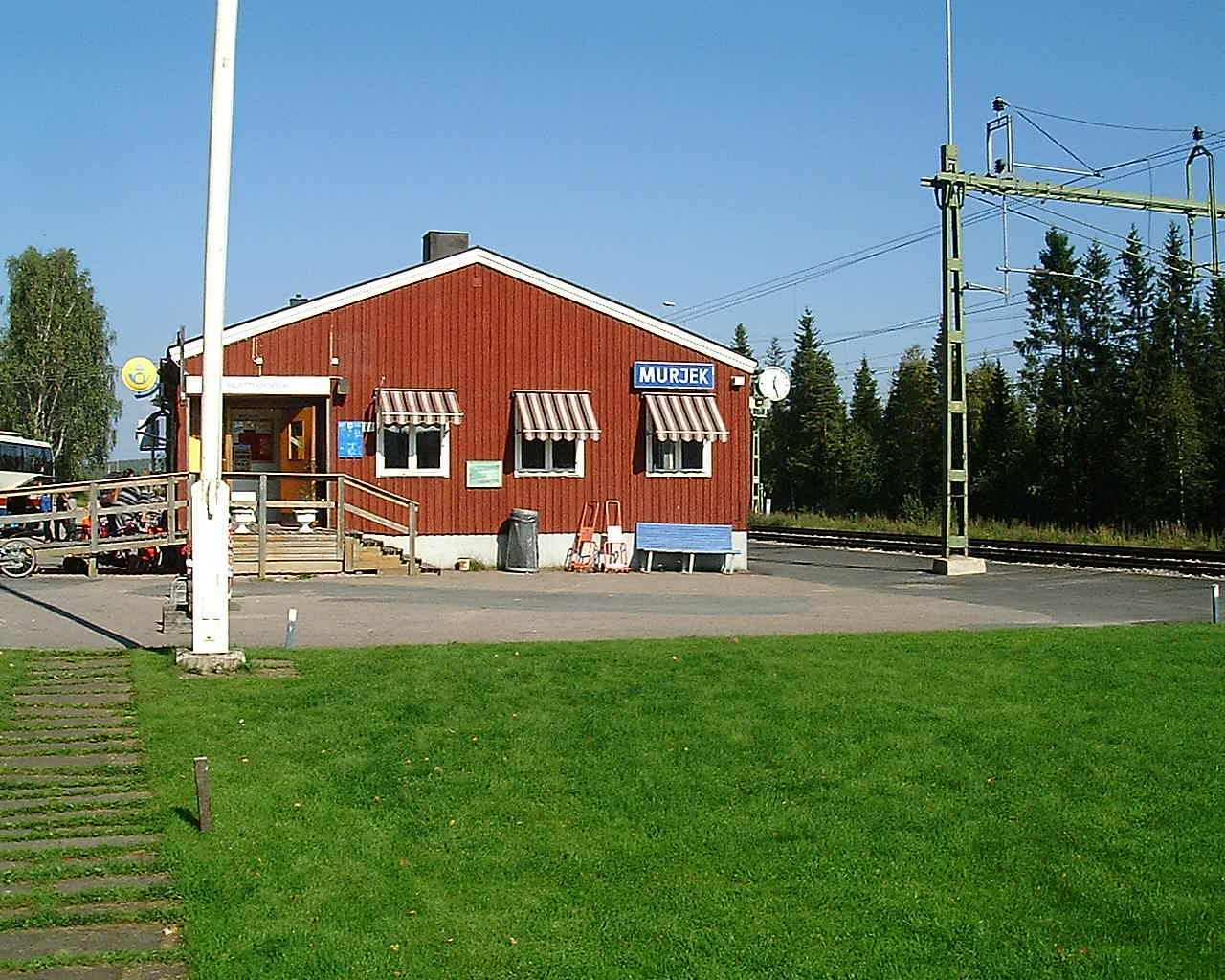
- The railroad station in Murjek

- Location within Norrbotten Location within Sweden
- Coordinates: 66°28′N 20°53′E
- Country: Sweden
- Province: Lapland
- County: Norrbotten County
- Municipality: Jokkmokk Municipality

Area
  - Total: 0.67 km^{2} (0.26 sq mi)

Population (2005-12-31)
  - Total: 83
  - Density: 125/km^{2} (320/sq mi)
- Time zone: UTC+1 (CET)
  - Summer (DST): UTC+2 (CEST)

Murjek (Swedish pronunciation: [ˈmɵ̌rjɛk]) is a village situated in Jokkmokk Municipality, Norrbotten County, Sweden with 83 inhabitants in 2005.

The village is a popular train stop for hikers and tourists, as buses to Kvikkjokk go from Murjek. Kvikkjokk is a common starting point for hikes into Sarek National Park.
