= Langenprozelten Pumped Storage Station =

Pumped storage power station in Bavaria

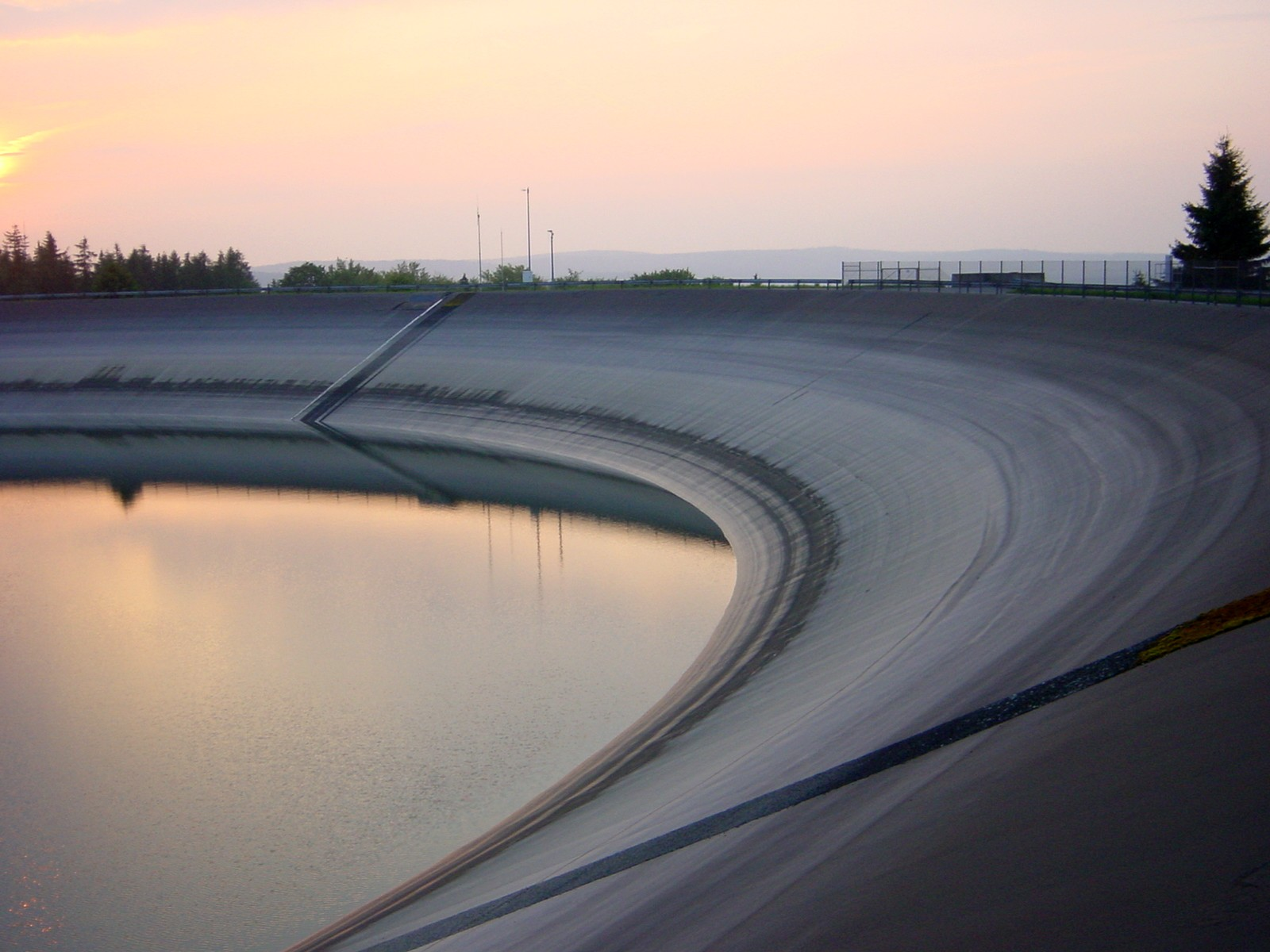
Upper reservoir, May 2010

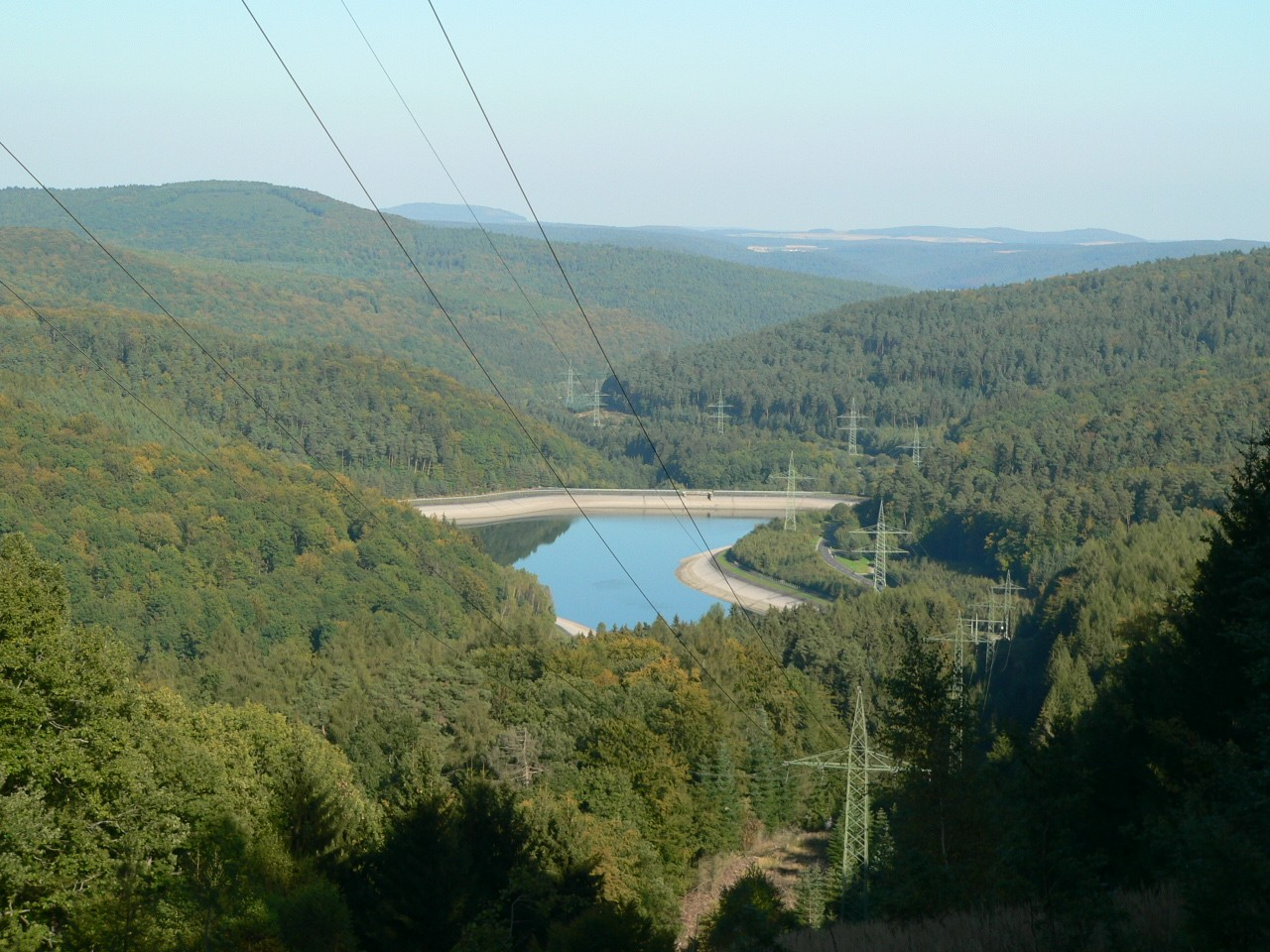
Lower reservoir

The Langenprozelten Pumped Storage Station is a pumped storage power station near Gemünden am Main at the Main in the under-Frankish district Main Spessart (Bavaria), which went in service in 1976. The hydro-electric power plant has an output of 180 megawatts (240,000 hp). It uses two Francis turbines. The reservoirs are connected by 1.3-kilometre-long (0.81 mi) pipes. The maximum head is 320 metres (1,050 ft). The upper reservoir has a capacity of approximately 1.5 million cubic metres (1,200 acre⋅ft). The maximum energy store ability amounts to 950 megawatt-hours (3,400 GJ).

The station produces traction current only and is an important peak load power station in the traction network for railways.

The lower reservoir, situated at 50°03′19″N 9°35′16″E, is fed by a creek, which is mostly dry in the summer. Therefore, if necessary, water is pumped from a further retention basin, which is situated 1.2 kilometres (0.75 mi) below the lower reservoir. Both dams (of upper and lower reservoir) are rock fill embankment dams with an asphaltic concrete external sealing.
