= Eksund =

- Location within Östergötland Location within Sweden
- Coordinates: 58°35′16″N 16°05′23″E
- Country: Sweden
- Province: Östergötland
- County: Östergötland County
- Municipality: Norrköping Municipality

Area
  - Total: 0.22 km^{2} (0.085 sq mi)

Population (31 December 2010)
  - Total: 206
  - Density: 927/km^{2} (2,400/sq mi)
- Time zone: UTC+1 (CET)
  - Summer (DST): UTC+2 (CEST)

Eksund is a locality situated in Norrköping Municipality, Östergötland County, Sweden with 206 inhabitants in 2010.
