= Lünen Power Station =

Coal power plant in Germany

Coordinates: 51°36′52″N 7°28′53″E

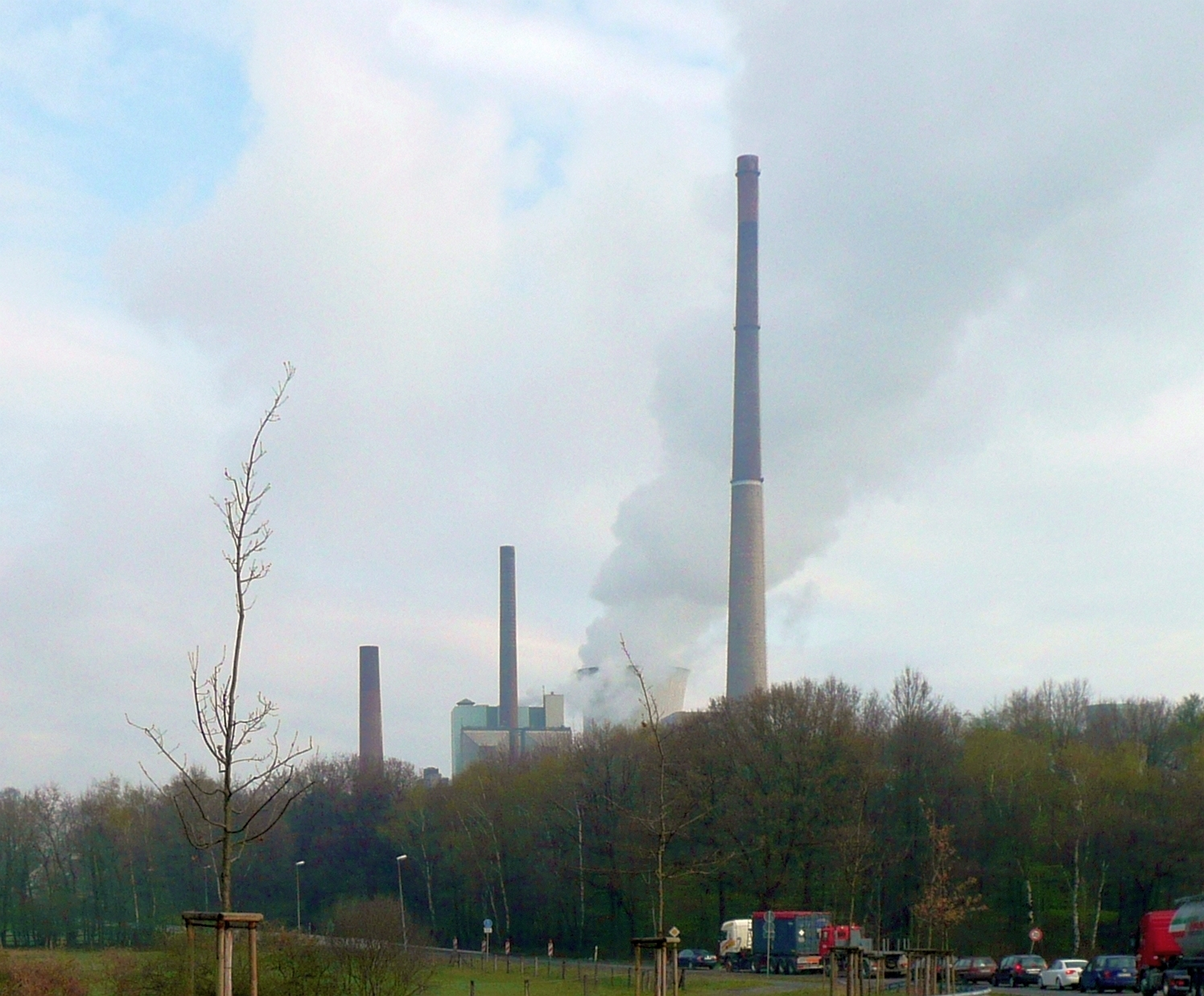
Lünen Power Station

Lünen Power Station was a coal-fired power station in Germany. It was located in Lünen, in the district Unna. It had an output capacity of 500 megawatts. The first power station in Lünen was commissioned in 1938. The power station produced traction current since 1984 also. The power station also produced long-distance heating since late 2003. Annual coal consumption amounted to 960,000 tons. The operator of the power station was Evonik Industries. The power station's chimney was 250 metres (820 ft) high.

It was decommissioned in 2018 and, in 2019, the dismantlement process started. In 2021, the cooling tower, the chimney, the boiler house were demolished.
