= Ryggen =

Ryggen is both a middle name and a surname. Notable people with the name include:

- Hannah Ryggen (1894–1970), Swedish and Norwegian textile artist
- Ingvild Ryggen Carstens (born 1980), Norwegian ski mountaineer
