= REScoop.be =

REScoop.be is the Belgian branch of the European group of cooperatives for renewable energy, REScoop.eu.

It was established in 2011 on the initiative of the Flemish energy cooperative Ecopower.

On the Belgian level it coordinates the cooperative initiatives of its members REScoop Vlaanderen and REScoop Wallonie.
