= Energy in Germany =

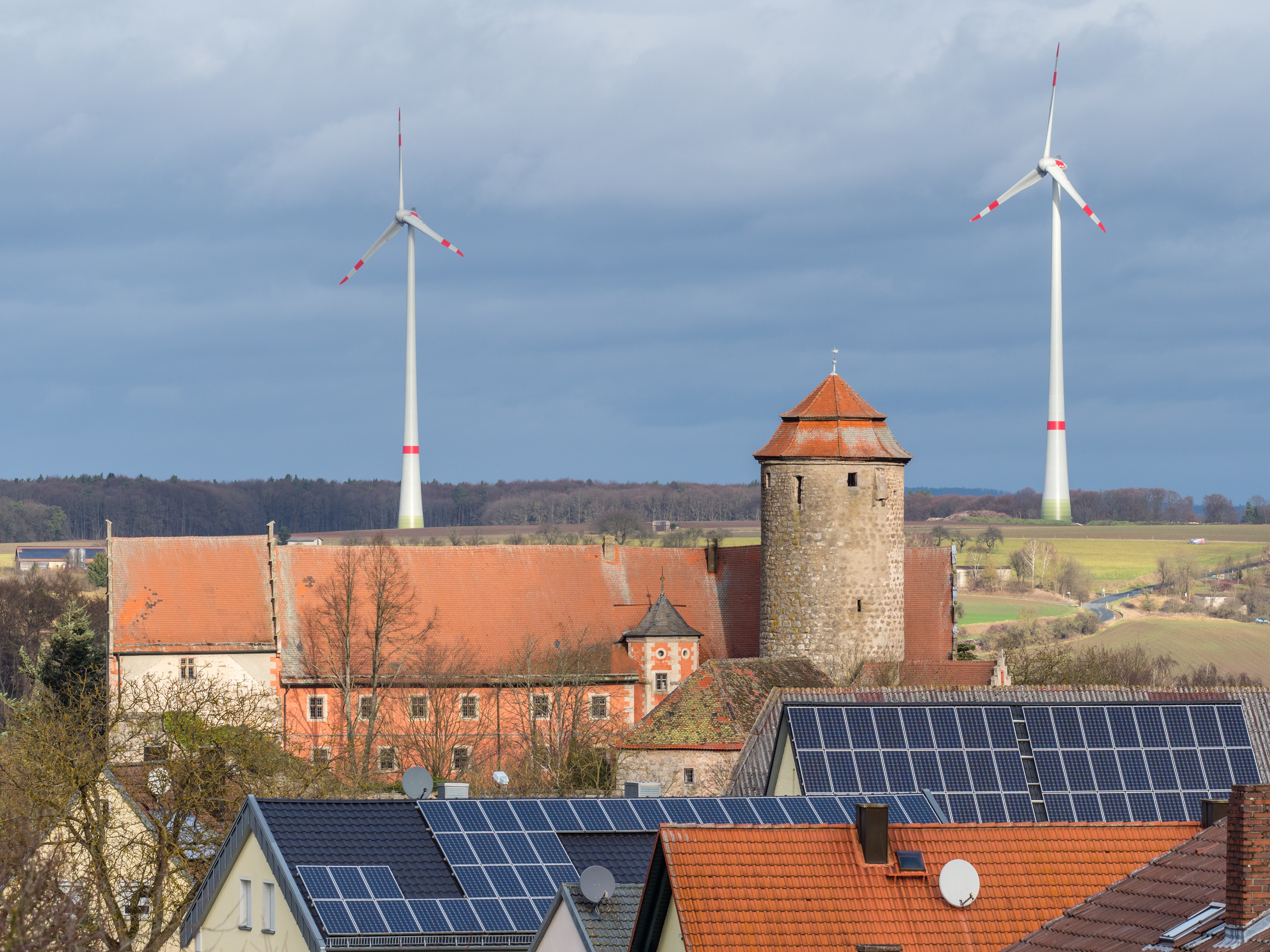
Wind turbines and solar panels at Lisberg Castle in Germany

Energy in Germany is derived primarily from fossil fuels. In 2025, petroleum accounted for 36% of primary energy consumption, natural gas for 27%, renewable energy for 21%, while lignite and hard coal each accounted for around 7%. Nuclear power has not been used for electricity generation since Germany’s last three nuclear reactors were shut down in 2023. Gross electricity generation in 2025 was about 500 TWh.

Key to German energy policy is the Energiewende (“energy transition”), which aims to shift the energy system away from fossil fuels and nuclear power towards renewable energy and greater energy efficiency. Germany is to phase out coal-fired electricity generation by 2038 at the latest. German government has set a target for renewable energy to account for at least 80% of gross electricity consumption by 2030.

== Energy consumption ==
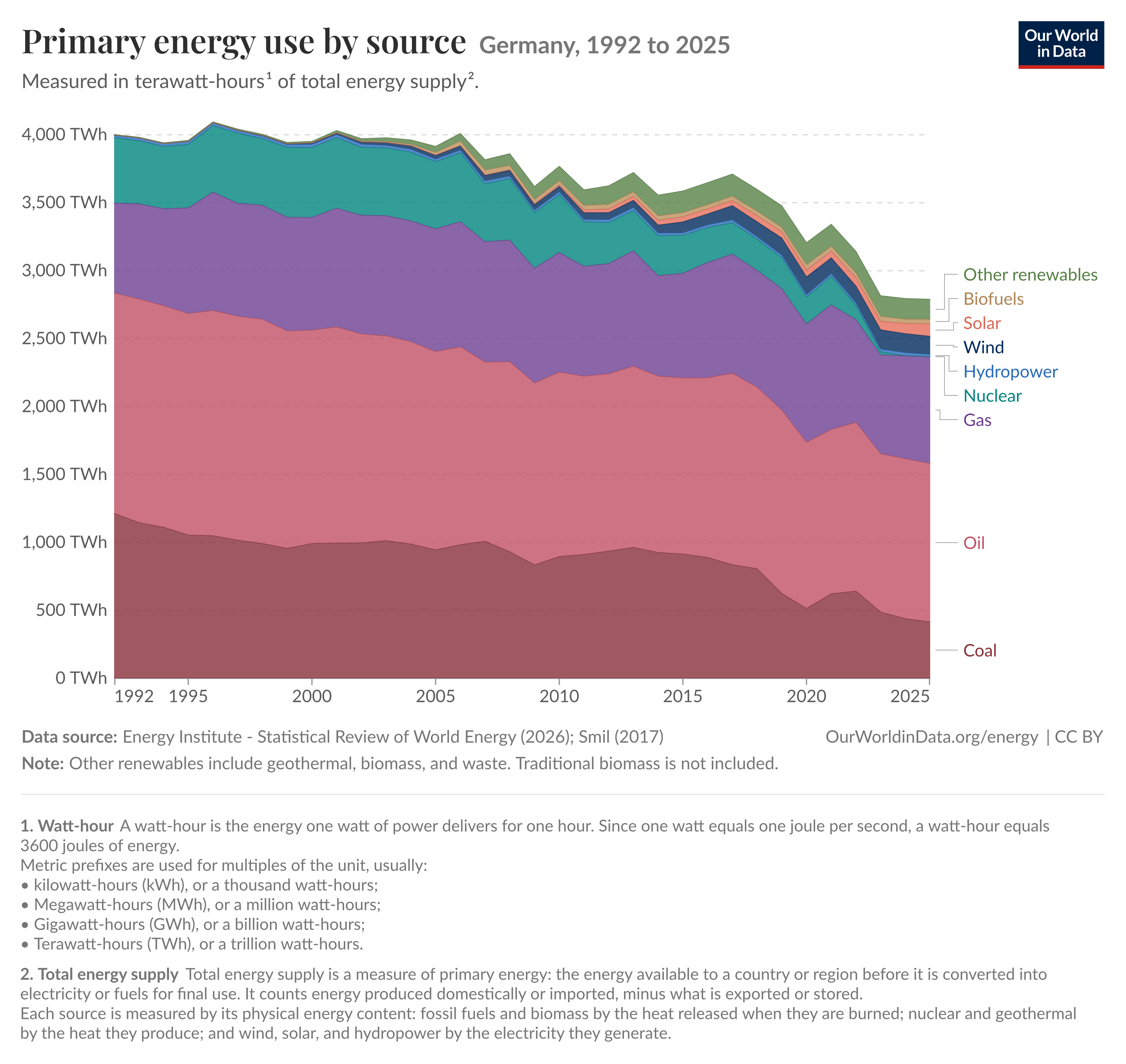

Fossil fuel consumption in Germany, including combined former East and West from 1980 to 2011 from EIA data. Use of coal declined significantly after reunification.

In 2025, energy consumption in Germany amounted to 8,252 PJ, around 13% lower than in 1990. Transport accounted for about 31% of energy consumption, followed by households at 28% and industry at 26%. The commercial and service sector accounted for about 15%. Renewable energy accounted for 23.8% of gross final energy consumption in 2025, with shares of 55.1% in electricity, 19.0% in heat, and 8.0% in transport.

== Energy imports ==
Germany is highly dependent on imported fossil fuels. In 2025, imports covered 96% of petroleum demand and 89% of natural gas demand. Hard coal has been entirely imported since domestic production ended in 2018. By contrast, lignite was produced domestically and renewable energy was supplied almost entirely from domestic sources. Imports covered 65.6% of Germany's energy requirements in 2025.

Fossil-fuel supplies were diversified following Russia's invasion of Ukraine in 2022 and the subsequent reduction in Russian energy imports. By 2025, Norway accounted for the largest share of both Germany's natural gas and crude oil imports. Additionally, electricity interconnectors such as NordLink enable direct power exchange between Norwegian hydroelectric generation and Germany's northern grid. Germany also developed liquefied natural gas (LNG) import capacity, with German LNG terminals accounting for 10.3% of natural gas imports in 2025.

Before 2022, Russia was Germany's largest supplier of natural gas, accounting for over 50% of imports. Nord Stream 1 began delivering Russian gas in 2011, replacing deliveries previously routed through Ukraine and the Czech Republic.

During the 2010s, Germany's natural gas import prices remained higher than wholesale prices in the US, where shale gas production was expanding.

To secure long-term clean energy imports alongside immediate fossil fuel diversification, Germany expanded bilateral energy partnerships under its National Hydrogen Strategy. Agreements with Australia, Chile, Canada, and Namibia focus on building supply corridors for green hydrogen and synthetic fuels, while multilateral Just Energy Transition Partnerships with countries like South Africa and Indonesia support broader decarbonization.

Germany was a net electricity importer in 2025, importing 76.2 TWh and exporting 54.3 TWh, resulting in net imports of 21.9 TWh.

== Electricity production by source ==
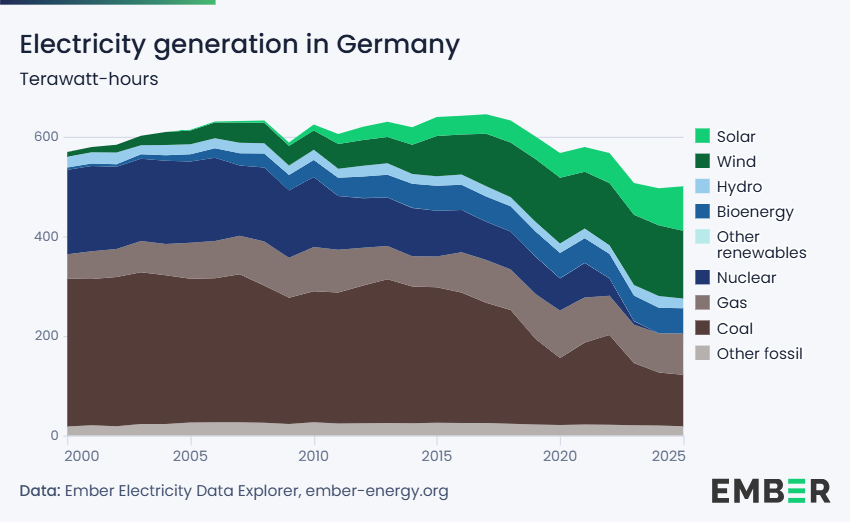
Electricity generation in Germany in terawatt-hours

German electricity by source in 2025

- Brown coal: 67.13 TW⋅h (16.3%)
- Hard coal: 26.16 TW⋅h (6.3%)
- Natural gas: 53.64 TW⋅h (13.0%)
- Wind: 131.17 TW⋅h (31.8%)
- Solar: 70.13 TW⋅h (17.0%)
- Biomass: 36.06 TW⋅h (8.7%)
- Hydro: 16.72 TW⋅h (4.1%)
- Oil: 2.82 TW⋅h (0.7%)
- Other: 8.93 TW⋅h (2.2%)
Net generated electricity in 2025

=== Fossil fuels ===
==== Coal power ====
Coal remains a significant source of electricity in Germany, although its share has declined substantially over the past decade. In 2025, lignite accounted for 14.6% of Germany's gross electricity production and hard coal for 5.9%, compared with a combined share of 28.1% in 2019.

Germany is also a major producer of coal. Lignite is extracted in the extreme western and eastern parts of the country, mainly in Nordrhein-Westfalen, Sachsen and Brandenburg. Considerable amounts are burned in coal plants near the mining areas to produce electricity and transporting lignite over far distances is not economically feasible; therefore, the plants are located near the extraction sites. Hard-coal mining in Germany ended in December 2018 with the closure of the last mines.

German coal-fired power plants are being designed and modified so they can be increasingly flexible to support the fluctuations resulting from increased renewable energy. Existing power plants in Germany are designed to operate flexibly. Load following is achieved by German natural gas combined cycle plants and coal-fired power plants. New coal-fired power plants have a minimum load capability of approximately 40%, with further potential to reduce this to 20–25%. The reason is that the output of the coal boiler is controlled via direct fuel combustion and not, as is the case with a gas combined-cycle power plant, via a heat recovery steam generator with an upstream gas turbine.

Germany has been opening new coal power plants until recently, following a 2007 plan to build 26 new coal plants. This has been controversial in light of Germany's commitment to curbing carbon emissions. By 2015, the growing share of renewable energy in the national electricity market (26% in 2014, up from 4% in 1990) and the government's mandated CO_{2} emission reduction targets (40% below 1990 levels by 2020; 80% below 1990 levels by 2050) have increasingly curtailed previous plans for new, expanded coal power capacity.

Germany's coal phase-out law requires electricity generation from hard coal and lignite to end by 2038 at the latest. A separate agreement brought forward the closure of RWE's lignite-fired power stations in the Rhineland to 2030. In December 2023, the European Commission approved €2.6 billion in compensation for RWE. In November 2025, it approved compensation of up to €1.75 billion for LEAG, covering lignite power-station closures in Lusatia scheduled between 2028 and 2038.

The federal government has committed up to €40 billion through 2038 to support structural change in coal-mining regions, including investment in transport infrastructure, research and training.

==== Natural gas ====
National energy policy has shifted towards utilizing natural gas to replace coal and serve as a complementary fuel source as green energy projects are developed. The seaports of Lubmin, Brunsbuettel, Stade, and Wilhelmshaven utilize floating liquefied natural gas floating storage and regasification units to import gas.

To secure natural gas imports alongside new floating LNG terminals, German energy entities established long-term supply agreements with Norwegian energy firm Equinor. These frameworks cover multi-billion cubic meter annual pipeline deliveries to support industrial demand and flexible natural gas power generation.

=== Renewable energy ===
Years in which the last three renewable power levels achieved
Achievement	Year	Achievement	Year	Achievement	Year
5%	2003	10%	2007	15%	2017

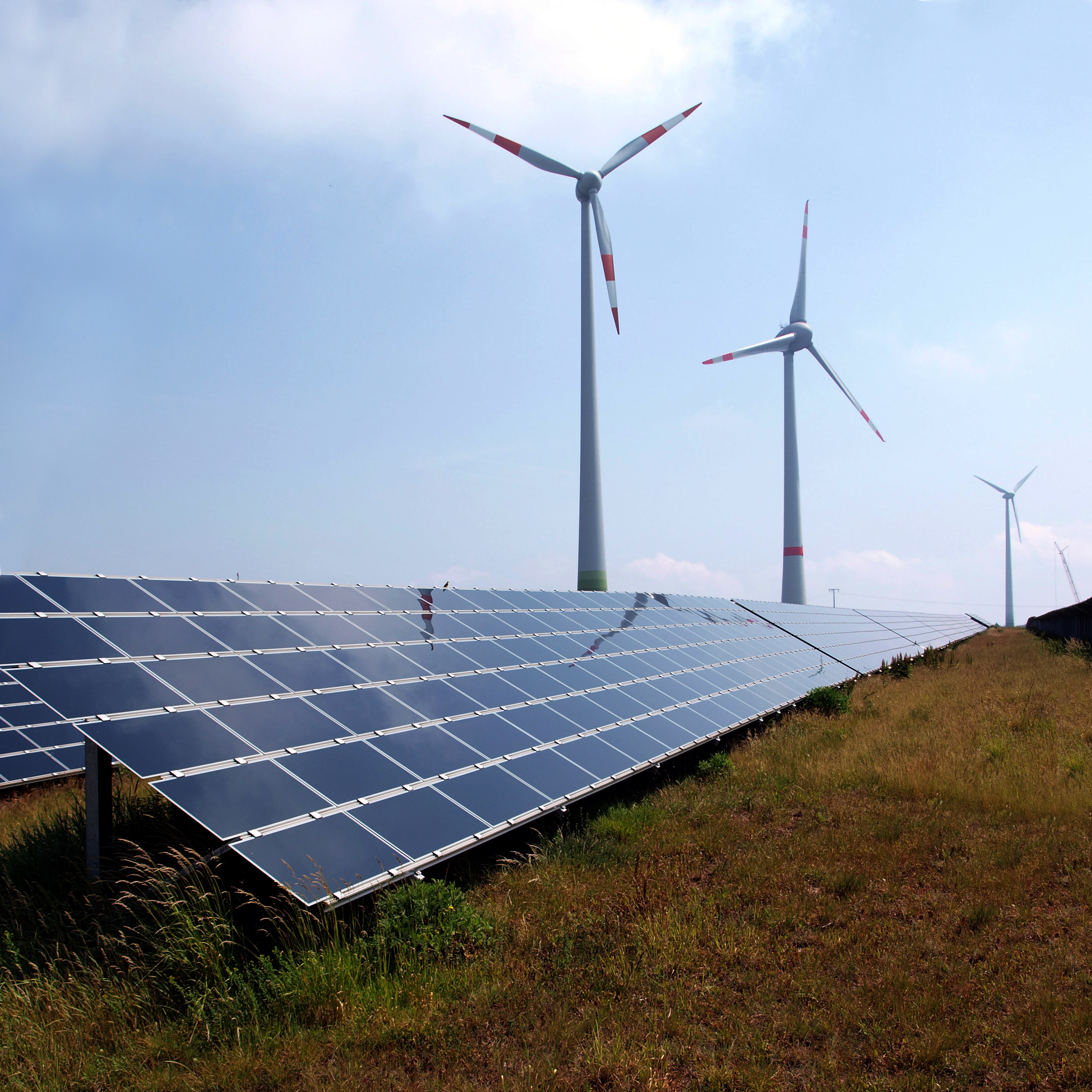
Photovoltaic array and wind turbines at the Schneebergerhof wind farm in the German state of Rheinland-Pfalz

Renewables accounted for 6.3% of Germany’s gross electricity consumption in 2000, when the Renewable Energy Sources Act came into force. In 2023, renewables supplied more than half of both electricity generation and consumption for the first time. By 2025, renewables covered 55.1% of Germany’s gross electricity consumption.

Hydropower was Germany’s largest source of renewable electricity until around 2000. Wind power, solar power and biomass have since overtaken it. Wind accounted for 46% of Germany’s renewable electricity generation in 2025, and solar power for 32%. Hydropower accounted for around 6% of renewable electricity generation. Biomass and other renewable sources supplied the remainder.

After the Renewable Energy Sources Act came into force in 2000, joint investment in wind farms and rooftop solar projects through energy communities became more widespread in Germany. A 2026 survey put the combined membership of 1,020 German energy cooperatives at about 230,000.

==== Solar power ====
In 2022, Germany had 66.5 GW of solar power capacity, which generated 62 terawatt hours of power from 2.65 million individual installations.

==== Wind power ====
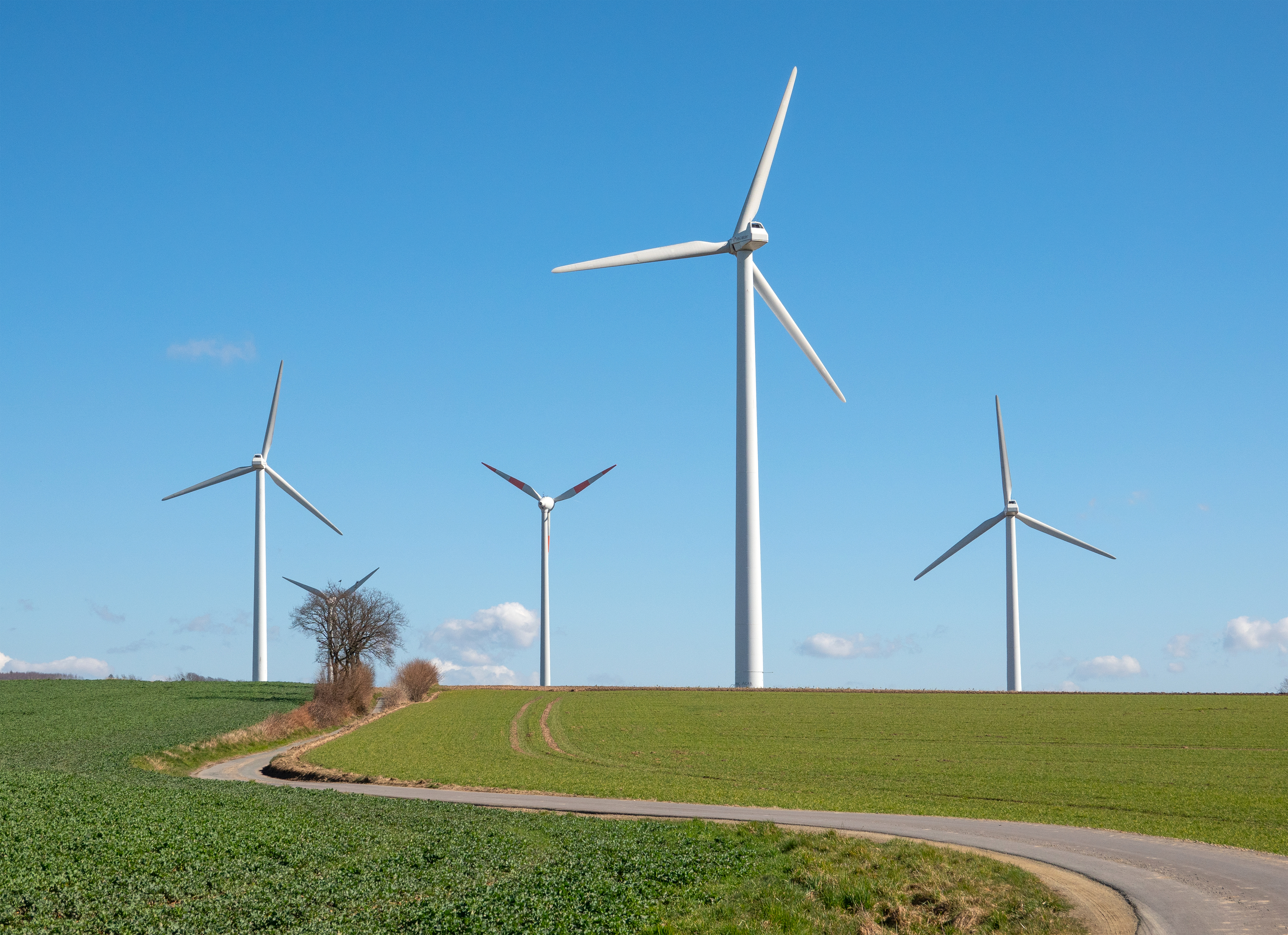
Wind farms in North Rhine-Westphalia

As of March 2023, there were approximately 28,500 wind turbines in operation in Germany with a combined capacity of 58.5 GW.

Onshore wind capacity in Germany is expected to reach 115 GW by 2030.

==== Bioenergy ====
In October 2016, the German Biomass Research Center (Deutsches Biomasseforschungszentrum, DBFZ) launched an online biomass atlas for researchers, investors and the interested public.

In 2005, Jühnde became Germany's first bioenergy village. Its biogas plant supplied heat to the village heating network and fed electricity into the public grid.

=== Nuclear power ===
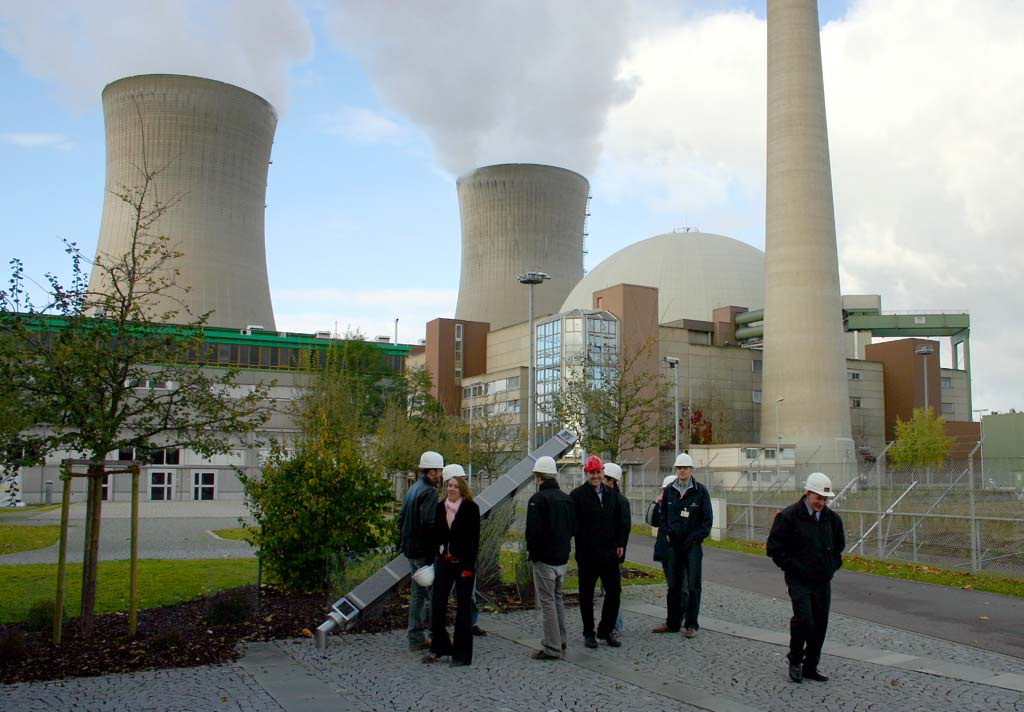
Grafenrheinfeld Nuclear Power Plant

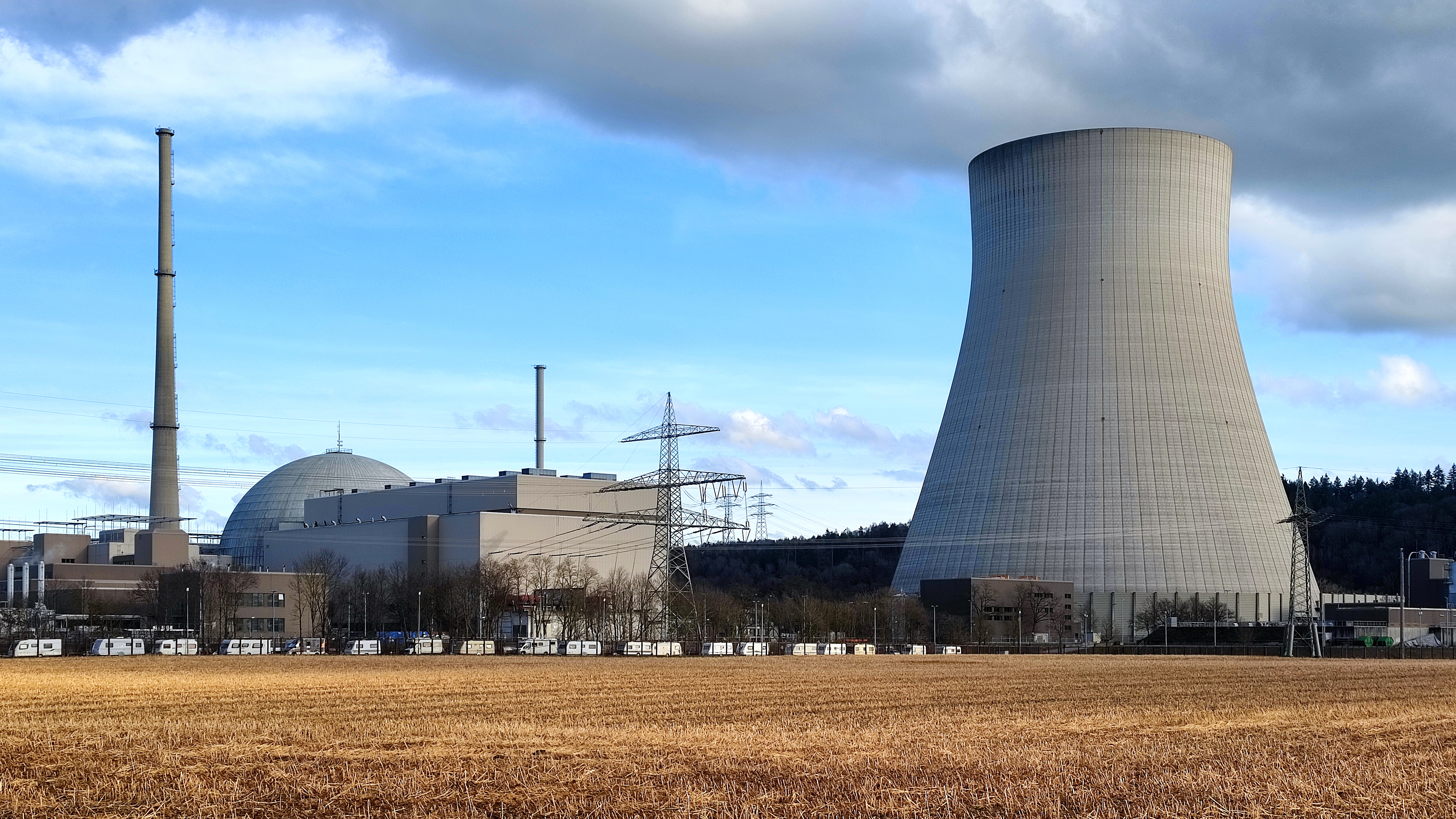
The Isar Nuclear Power Plant was taken out of service on 15 April 2023

Nuclear power has been a topical political issue in recent decades, with continuing debates about when the technology should be phased out. A coalition government of Gerhard Schröder took the decision in 2002 to phase out all nuclear power by 2022. The topic received renewed attention at the start of 2007 due to the political impact of the Russia-Belarus energy dispute and in 2011 after the Fukushima I nuclear accidents in Japan. Within days of the March 2011 Fukushima Daiichi nuclear disaster, large anti-nuclear protests occurred in Germany. Protests continued and, on 29 May 2011, Merkel's government announced that the country would shut down all of its nuclear power plants by 2022. Eight of the seventeen operating reactors in Germany were permanently shut down following Fukushima in 2011.

The last operational German reactors Isar 2, Emsland, and Neckarwestheim closed down in April 2023.

== Energy efficiency ==
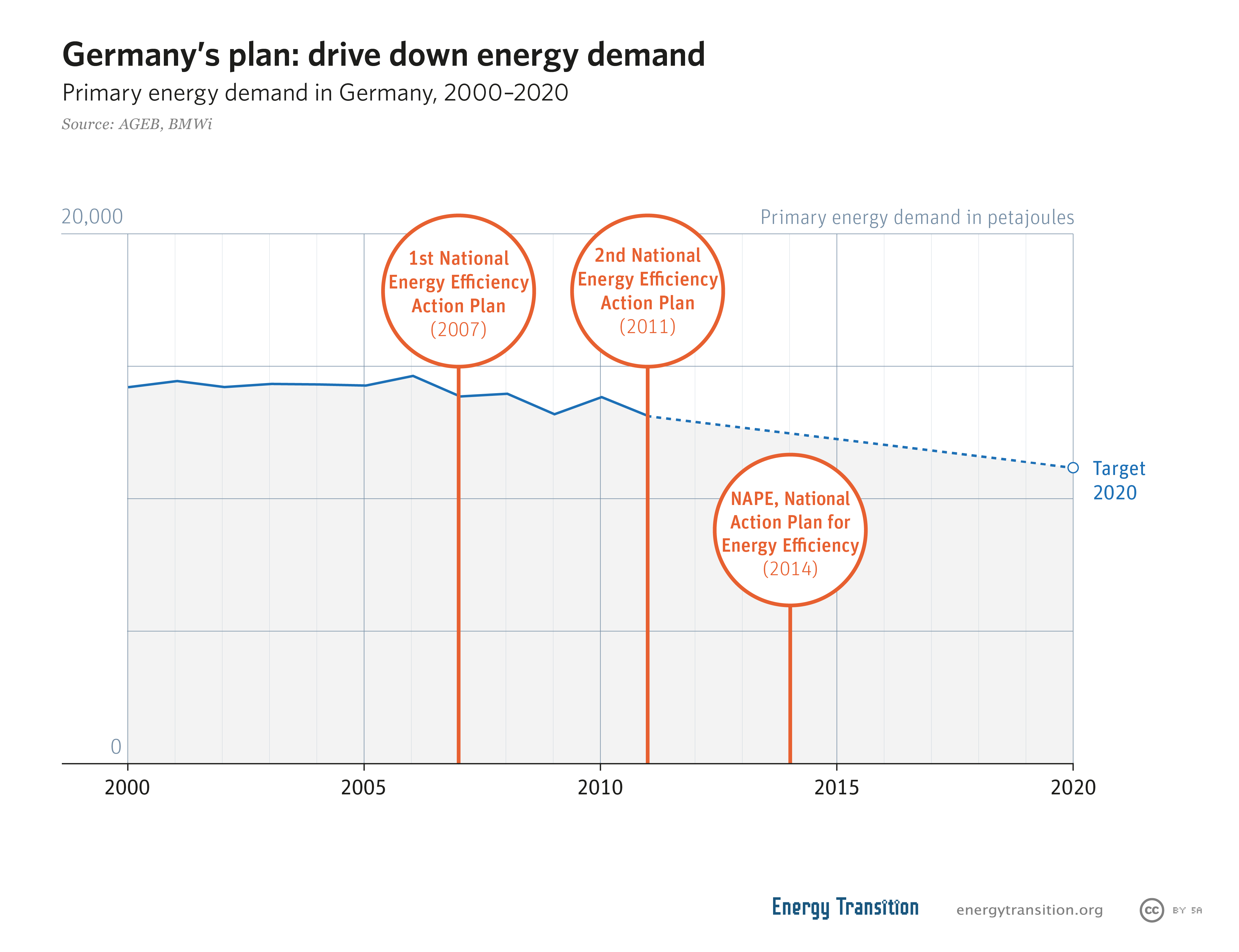
German Energy Efficiency Targets

The energy efficiency bottom-up index for the whole economy (ODEX) in Germany decreased by 18% between 1991 and 2006, which is equivalent to an energy efficiency improvement by 1.2% per annum on average based on the ODEX, which calculates technical efficiency improvements. Since the beginning of the new century, however, the efficiency improvement measured by the ODEX has slowed down. While a continuous decrease by 1.5%/y could be observed between 1991 and 2001, the decrease in the period from 2001 to 2006 only amounted to 0.5%, which is below the EU-27 level.

By 2030, the German Federal Ministry of the Economy projects an increase in electricity consumption to 658 TWh. The expected increase is due to an expected uptick in electric mobility, more heating through electric heat-pumps, and production of batteries and hydrogen.

== Government energy policy ==
Germany used to be the fourth-largest producer of nuclear power in the world, but in 2000, the government and the German nuclear power industry agreed to phase out all nuclear power plants by 2021, as a result of an initiative with a vote result of 513 Yes, 79 No and 8 Empty. The seven oldest reactors were permanently closed after the Fukushima accident. However, being an integral part of the EU's internal electricity market, Germany will continue to consume foreign nuclear electricity even after 2022. In September 2010, Merkel's government reached a late-night deal which would see the country's 17 nuclear plants run, on average, 12 years longer than planned, with some remaining in production until well into the 2030s. Then, following the Fukushima Daiichi nuclear disaster, the government changed its mind again, deciding to proceed with the plan to close all nuclear plants in the country by 2022.

After becoming Chancellor of Germany, Angela Merkel expressed concern for overreliance on Russian energy, but the policy of energy imports did not change significantly afterwards.

Prior to the 2022 Russian invasion of Ukraine, Germany was highly dependent on Russian energy, which accounted for half of its natural gas, a third of heating oil, and half of its coal imports. Due to this reliance, Germany blocked, delayed or watered down EU proposals to cut Russian energy imports amid the 2022 Russian invasion of Ukraine. Subsequently, Germany made a radical shift in energy policy, with the goal of independence from Russian energy imports by mid-2024.

Government policy emphasises conservation and the development of renewable sources, such as solar, wind, biomass, water, and geothermal power. As a result of energy saving measures, energy efficiency (the amount of energy required to produce a unit of gross domestic product) has been improving since the beginning of the 1970s.

Speaking at the COP28 climate summit in Dubai in December 2023, German Chancellor Olaf Scholz called for a phase-out of fossil fuels, including coal, oil and natural gas, and reiterated Germany's commitment to be climate neutral by 2045, saying, "The technologies are there: wind power, photovoltaics, electric motors, green hydrogen."

=== Sustainable energy ===
In September 2010, the German government announced a new aggressive energy policy with the following targets:

- Reducing CO_{2} emissions 40% below 1990 levels by 2020 and 80% below 1990 levels by 2050
- Increasing the relative share of renewable energy in gross energy consumption to 18% by 2020, 30% by 2030 and 60% by 2050
- Increasing the relative share of renewable energy in gross electrical consumption to 35% by 2020 and 80% by 2050
- Increasing the national energy efficiency by cutting electrical consumption 50% below 2008 levels by 2050

Forbes ranked German Aloys Wobben ($3B), founder of Enercon, as the richest person in the energy business (wind power) in Germany in 2013.

=== Taxes ===
==== Fossil fuel taxes ====
2019 fossil fuel taxes
	Gas oil (>50 mg/kg sulfur)	Gas oil(≤50 mg/kg sulfur)	Heavy oil	Other oils	Natural Gas	Liquefied petroleum gas
unit	€/liter	€/liter	€/kg	€/liter	€/MWh	€/tonne
Taxation	0.7635	0.6135	0.25	0.6135	5.50	60.60

==== Carbon tax ====
The German ecological tax reform was adopted in 1999. After that, the law was amended in 2000 and in 2003. The law grew taxes on fuel and fossil fuels and laid the foundation for the tax for energy. In December 2019, the German Government agreed on a carbon tax of 25 Euros per tonne of CO_{2} on oil and gas companies. The law came into effect in January 2021. The tax will increase to 55 Euros per tonne by 2025. From 2026 onwards, the price will be decided at auction.

Development of carbon dioxide emissions

== See also ==
- Dunkelflaute
- Electricity sector in Germany
- Ende Gelände
- Energy transition in Germany, also known as the Energiewende
- German Renewable Energy Sources Act, also known as the Erneuerbare-Energien-Gesetz
- Renewable energy in Germany
- Economy of Germany
