= Renewable energy cooperative =

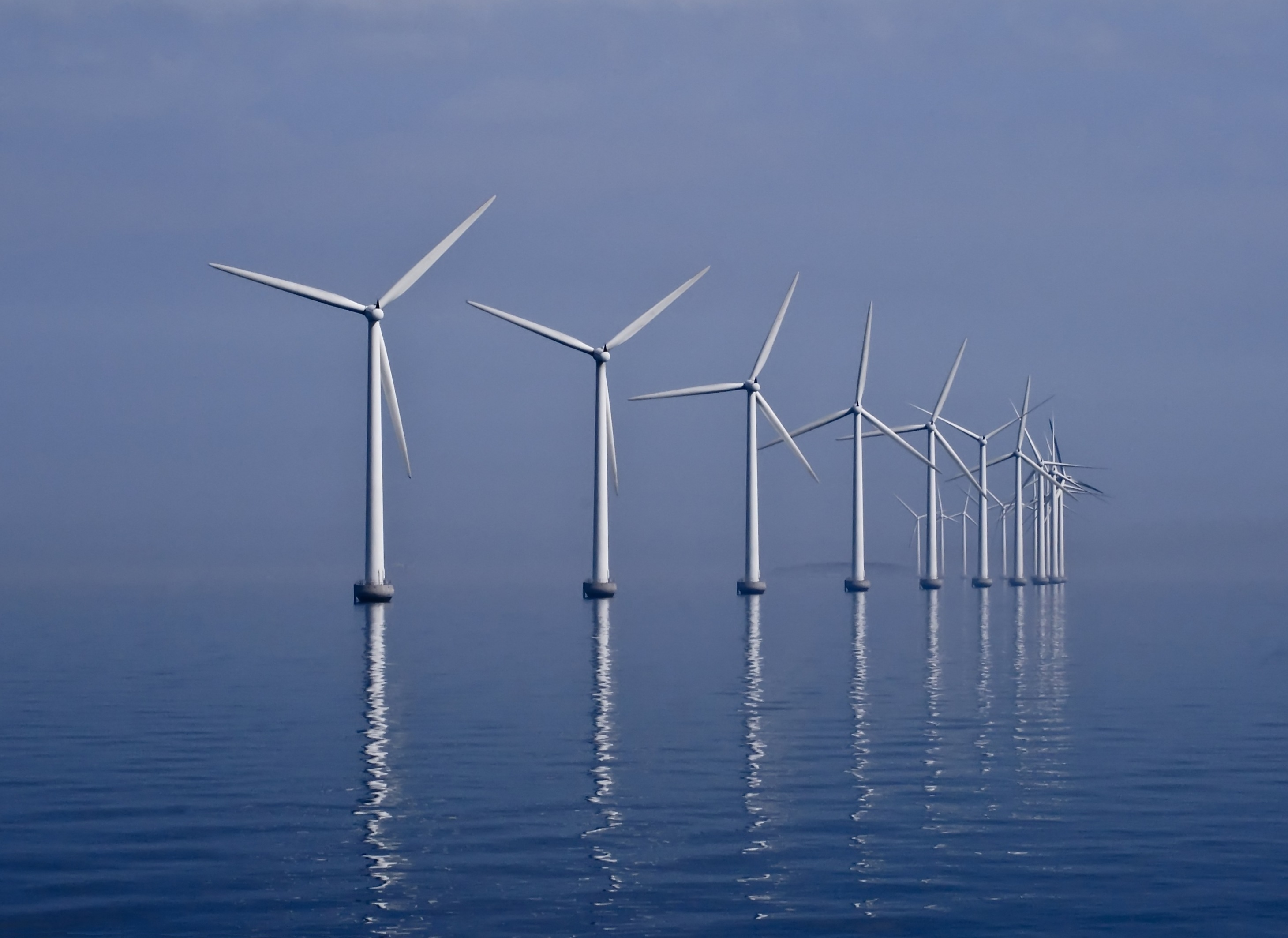
Wind Farm as an example of a renewable energy source

A renewable energy cooperative is a decentralized, non-governmental initiative of local communities and citizens who jointly own an energy business and vote on how it is run. They can own wind turbines, solar installations or biomass plants. Some also supply electricity to customers or heat buildings through a local heating network. They range from groups formed to build one installation to businesses running several energy projects.

Like other cooperatives, they follow principles of voluntary and open membership, democratic control, autonomy and concern for the community. Members usually have one vote each, regardless of how many shares they hold. They decide how to use any surplus, which can go towards new projects or dividends.

== Purpose ==
As climate change accelerates and people become more aware of the impacts of greenhouse gas emissions on environmental and human health, attention turns to the energy sector. Transitioning from traditional fossil fuel energy sources such as coal and oil to renewable energy sources like wind and solar energy has arisen as a possible method to mitigate climate change. RECs provide a bottom-up approach to this by allowing citizens to invest in renewable energy and work to decentralize control from a handful of companies to several local sources.

The purpose of establishing renewable energy cooperatives touches upon environmental, economic, and social issues. They first work to encourage a shift in the energy system to a cleaner and more sustainable line of renewable energy sources, helping to reduce the impacts of climate change. They also disseminate renewable energy technologies by serving as an alternative to the current system of state or corporate-owned and highly centralized energy generation. Doing so democratizes the system so that energy generation is controlled by many local movements rather than by a few companies; for example, five companies in the case of Spain. By spreading out energy generation, local economies benefit and generate employment opportunities. The increased competition also helps stabilize energy prices, supporting equal access to energy. Local producers can even profit by selling energy back to the centralized grid. Many times, the revenue generated by a cooperative is reinvested back into developing new facilities or improving current technology. RE co-ops give more power and control to citizens so that they are less dependent on their energy supply and can have more influence on and engagement with their energy sourcing.

== How they work ==
Several types of RE co-ops exist, based on the type of energy source used, what added value they bring, and the business model they follow. The type of energy source means exactly as it sounds; does the RE co-op focus on solar, wind, geothermal, biogas, biomass, and/or tidal energy? The added value describes the role that the cooperative plays in the overall market: consumer, producer, distributor, trader, or a hybrid of these. Lastly, the business model refers to the size of the cooperative, composition of its members, and method of interaction with other organizations. There are six models: Local Group of Citizens, Regional-National RE co-ops, Fully Integrated RE co-ops, Network of RE co-ops, Multi-Stakeholder Governance Model, and Non-Energy-Focused Organizations. The Local Group of Citizens model centers around a specific project for a local cooperative. It is very small and localized, so the members exist as the only investors. Once the project is completed, it usually does not expand. In fact, they are often referred to as a renewable energy source (RES) project since it revolves around a single renewable energy creation or improvement. Regional-National cooperatives operate at either a regional or national level. They are made up of a mix of volunteers and employees and can be financed by both members and investors, unlike the Local Group of Citizens model. Started by a group of citizens, it serves as bottom-up development for several projects at once. Co-ops using this model can help develop single RES projects but tend to work towards larger goals (e.g. wind energy across the country). A Fully Integrated model holds and controls the entire energy market for themselves. They cover production, supply, distribution when possible, and other services. Evolving from the previous two models, a Fully Integrated model strives for energy independence from the common large company-dominated market. A Network of RE co-ops is a structured group that connects several RE co-ops. It works to improve the operation and balance the time, resources, and overall economy through education and rules. This model embodies horizontal integration. Multi-Stakeholder Governance models, on the other hand, are based on vertical integration. This type of RE co-op is composed of members and agents of the energy market such as consumers, producers, workers, etc. These co-ops can exist on several levels, from local to regional, but must include a mixed composition of supporters. Finally, Non-Energy-Focused Organizations do not operate for the purpose of renewable energy sourcing but create RES projects in the process of accomplishing a different goal. They resemble RE co-ops in action, but differ in their objectives.

As a general template, renewable energy cooperatives begin with a core group establishing the feasibility of the project based on grant funding, research, and advice. If the project is deemed feasible, the group then creates and publishes a share prospectus that explains the business plan, expected return on investment (ROI), and plans for community benefit. This scheme is marketed locally to try to attract investors who ideally become members of the cooperative. For larger projects, income from individual investors may be supplemented by a bank loan or help from a commercial developer. Once they gather the necessary funds, the scheme is constructed. Profits can go toward the members, the community, or reinvested back into future schemes, depending on how the members of the cooperative choose to allocate the funds.

== Benefits ==
RE cooperatives create projects wherein communities exhibit a high degree of ownership and control while benefitting from the outcomes. Civic participation in energy sourcing allows the community to work together to create a more sustainable society with independence from large energy companies. The decentralization allows for fairer pricing which helps reduce energy poverty and empowers local communities. By acting as both producers and consumers, citizens can profit by selling the energy generated and/or purchasing energy at a lower cost. These co-ops adjust consumer behaviors to reduce energy consumption and source their energy from renewable options. Decreasing fossil fuel usage by shifting to renewable energy sources can improve air quality and slow the changing climate which improves living conditions for the entire population. With citizens more involved in their energy sourcing, there is likely to be more participation in energy policy as well. There is increased transparency and trust that comes along with education and awareness of energy sourcing and efficiency. Pope Francis, in his 2015 encyclical letter Laudato si', refers to electricity cooperatives as "a simple example show[ing] that, while the existing world order proves powerless to assume its responsibilities, local individuals and groups can make a real difference".

== Barriers ==
As a group of citizens trying to break into a pre-established energy sector dominated by large companies, there can be many barriers. The barriers can be grouped into monetary, market, regulatory, perception/awareness, and human capital categories. RE co-ops lack capital, which is a huge obstacle at the beginning of creation. Energy facilities require high investment costs – more than a small group of citizens can afford. Right at the start, the co-ops need either a lot of partners or financial assistance from outside groups. Without financial infrastructure, it is extremely difficult for RE cooperatives to obtain the funds they need to build or operate energy facilities. In certain places, such as areas in Germany, banks will provide loans and capital to renewable energy cooperatives to facilitate their conception. Most locations do not have a financial structure that supports the formation of such cooperatives, however, making capital extremely hard to obtain.

In an already established market, cooperatives can struggle to break in. Many countries do not allow for independent energy distribution, only state-run, completely barring RECs from entering that market. The cooperatives often have limited access to locations for new infrastructure as well, making expansion difficult. For production, large companies tend to have an advantage as they are already well-known and spread out, so RE co-ops must pull those customers away. RECs are often too small to fall within public procurement regimes, so there is little information provided to public officials. Without regulatory frameworks installed to assist the development of such cooperatives, many have to stumble to figure out what they are allowed and prohibited from doing each time. Furthermore, regulatory barriers exist to access public energy purchasing markets. These entry barriers require financial guarantees and technical solvency before a new organization can enter the market.

One major obstacle that all renewable energy activists must overcome is the lack of public acceptance or awareness of renewable energy. Without this, demand does not exist to support the mission of RECs. From a regulatory standpoint, policymakers may question the environmental impacts and ethics of renewable energy operations, maintaining the financial exclusion of these cooperatives. The members understand this flaw in their strategy as well as the financial strain the cooperative requires and, as a result, are generally risk-averse, reducing the amount of financing and risk they are willing to take.

Lastly, since renewable energy cooperatives spawn from a group of citizens, there can be a lack of human capital in terms of knowledge, expertise, and experience. The members involved must be familiar with the RE markets, skills in project management, and understand how renewable sources provide energy. Lack of management and distrust in fellow members can lead to conflict within the cooperative as well. With much of management and/or members unsalaried, it is common for RECs to lack the necessary competency and knowledge to succeed in entering markets and accomplishing their goals, especially when considering the pre-existing barriers.

=== Methods used to overcome barriers ===
Existing renewable energy cooperatives have acknowledged these barriers and work to overcome them. One commonly used strategy is to create internal and external networks of RE co-ops. Since participation, conflict, and trust are relatively low hanging fruits to running a successful RE co-op, an internal alliance network can be effective in encouraging communication and engagement. This allows for members to talk to each other, offer advice, and discuss internal issues. External networks can help form partnerships to work through obstacles and provide guidance to each other. Partnerships with other RECs, NGOs, government groups, and other stakeholders can be extremely helpful in navigating the renewable energy realm. Furthermore, a strong alliance network encourages other members to join and make investors more likely to provide financial support. Different cooperatives utilize various financial structures to increase investment and returns. Some examples listed in the literature include investments in energy shares by the members in relation to the electricity used annually. These contributions go towards promoting new facilities and are promised to be returned to the members in full within 25 years with 0% interest. Others deduct whatever contributions members make from their monthly energy bills. More overarching mechanisms include Guarantee of Origin certificates (aka green certificates; renewable certificates) which allow cooperatives to sell energy consumed by its members as their own renewable energy, even if the energy was produced outside of the cooperative. Some countries are making strides to provide bank loans to cooperatives. Germany has Kreditanstalt Für Wiederaufbau (KfW), translated to German Development Banks that provide loans and capital to RECs, while also encouraging local banks to help out. The United Kingdom has a feed-in tariff system that guarantees the price per kilowatt for projects under five megawatts for 20 years and provides bank loans to cooperatives. Most strategies to overcome obstacles are therefore about uniting and educating the people while searching for financial answers.

== Examples ==
Most renewable energy cooperatives are located in Northern Europe, the U.S., and Canada. There are approximately 45 active RE co-ops in Canada, co-ops in 47 states of the U.S. supplying energy to 12% of the population, and almost 3,000 RECs in Europe. Of the northern European countries, Germany, Denmark, and the Netherlands have found the most success. In fact, 80% of all RECs in Europe are located in either Germany or Denmark.

=== Germany ===
Energy cooperatives grew rapidly in Germany after 2006. Their growth was supported by feed-in tariffs under the Renewable Energy Sources Act and a 2006 amendment to cooperative law that simplified their formation. Fewer energy cooperatives were set up after 2013, but 2023 saw 88 new cooperatives, the most in a decade. The DGRV recorded 88 new energy cooperatives in 2023, the highest annual figure in ten years.

In its 2026 survey, the German Cooperative and Raiffeisen Confederation (DGRV) reported 1,020 affiliated energy cooperatives with about 230,000 members. Installing and operating solar power systems was their most common activity, and about a third were involved in heating networks.

=== Denmark ===
Denmark's RE co-ops are mostly focused on wind energy. The government encourages their creation by providing tax exemptions to families that generate their own electricity or buy shares of RE cooperatives. As a result, over 100,000 families belonged to wind turbine cooperatives by 2001. These same co-ops installed 86% of all wind turbines in the country and, as of 2012, wind cooperatives owned 20.4% of the total installed wind power capacity in Denmark.

Early examples in Denmark according to the CommunityPower research project include the Middelgrunden Wind Turbine Cooperative.

=== Other examples of European RE Co-ops ===
Some other significant European renewable energy cooperatives are listed below:

- Enercoop: Located in France; 252 producers delivering 245 GWh of renewable energy to 88,000 customers
- Ecopower: Located in Belgium; It invests in renewable energy projects and supplies electricity to its members. In 2025, it had about 73,000 members and 60,000 customers
- Energy4All: Located in the United Kingdom; more than 30 cooperatives with over 10,000 members
- Som Energia: Located in Spain; Has over 54,000 members who have invested over 12 million Euros into RE production projects; Produced over 11.8 GWh
- ènostra: Located in Italy; 20,000 members and over 34 GWh delivered, 5 GWh produced (as of 2025) with 6 M€ in shareholders' capital (2023)

=== Turkey ===
New Turkish energy policies from the Renewable Energies Act have attempted to encourage the growth of renewable energy cooperatives to keep up with growing energy demand and reduce dependency on energy imports. After their economic crisis in 2001, the government worked to remodel the energy market from a state-owned model to an entirely privatized system. System reforms made it possible for 49.8% of the electricity production to be sourced from renewables by the end of 2019. In 2020, there exist 46 cooperatives. While it is not a large number compared to countries in Europe, the government has enacted REC regulations that allow cooperatives of certain sizes to be exempt from establishing themselves as a legal company and obtaining licenses. They can therefore avoid much of the regulations that licensed energy actors face. By 2023, the Republic of Turkey's Ministry of Energy and Natural Resources (MENR) aims to increase shares of renewable energy sources by 30%.

=== REScoop.eu ===
REScoop.eu is a federation of groups of citizens and cooperatives for renewable energy in Europe. Founded in 2011, it created a supporting network and serves as an umbrella under which many RECs lie. The federation provides tools and assistance to RE co-ops of different sizes and lobbies for equal access to the energy market. REScoop.eu's website allows for communication between cooperatives, inventories of all its member organizations, provides a place for recommendations and advice, and shares stories about existing renewable energy cooperatives. It sees renewable energy as a common good and believes citizens should be involved in buying, owning, and understanding RES to the point where it is considered a civic responsibility. It recognizes the barriers that RE co-ops must overcome to be successful and tries to mitigate those obstacles. REScoop lists five criteria to master: speed in the authorization process, the involvement of stakeholders and alignment of their interest, technical and economic sustainability of the project, financing schemes and participation of citizens as shareholders, and grid connection and the sale of energy. If a renewable energy cooperative can achieve each goal, then REScoop believes it will be successful.

== See also ==
- Energy community
