= Mengkofen Solar Park =

Photovoltaic power station in Bavaria, Germany

- Country: Germany
- Location: Bavaria
- Coordinates: 48°42′N 12°23′E
- Commission date: December 2009

Solar farm
- Type: Flat-panel PV

Power generation
- Units operational: 98,978
- Nameplate capacity: 21.78 MW_{p}
- Annual net output: 32.5 GWh

The Mengkofen Solar Park is a photovoltaic power station in Bavaria, Germany. It has an installed capacity of 21.78 megawatt (MW).

== See also ==
- Energy policy of the European Union
- Renewable energy commercialization
- Renewable energy in Germany
- Renewable energy in the European Union
