= Renewable energy in Germany =

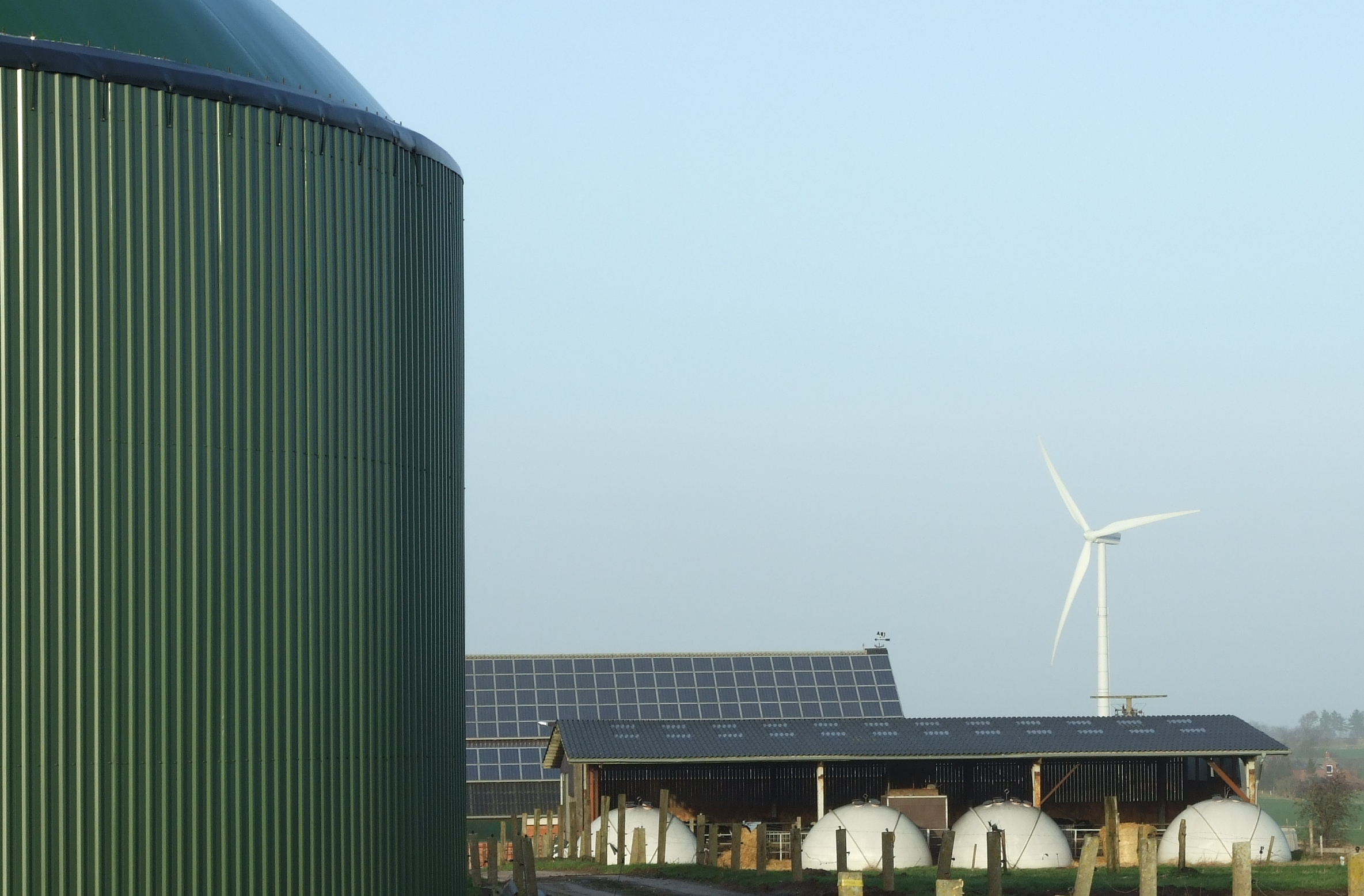
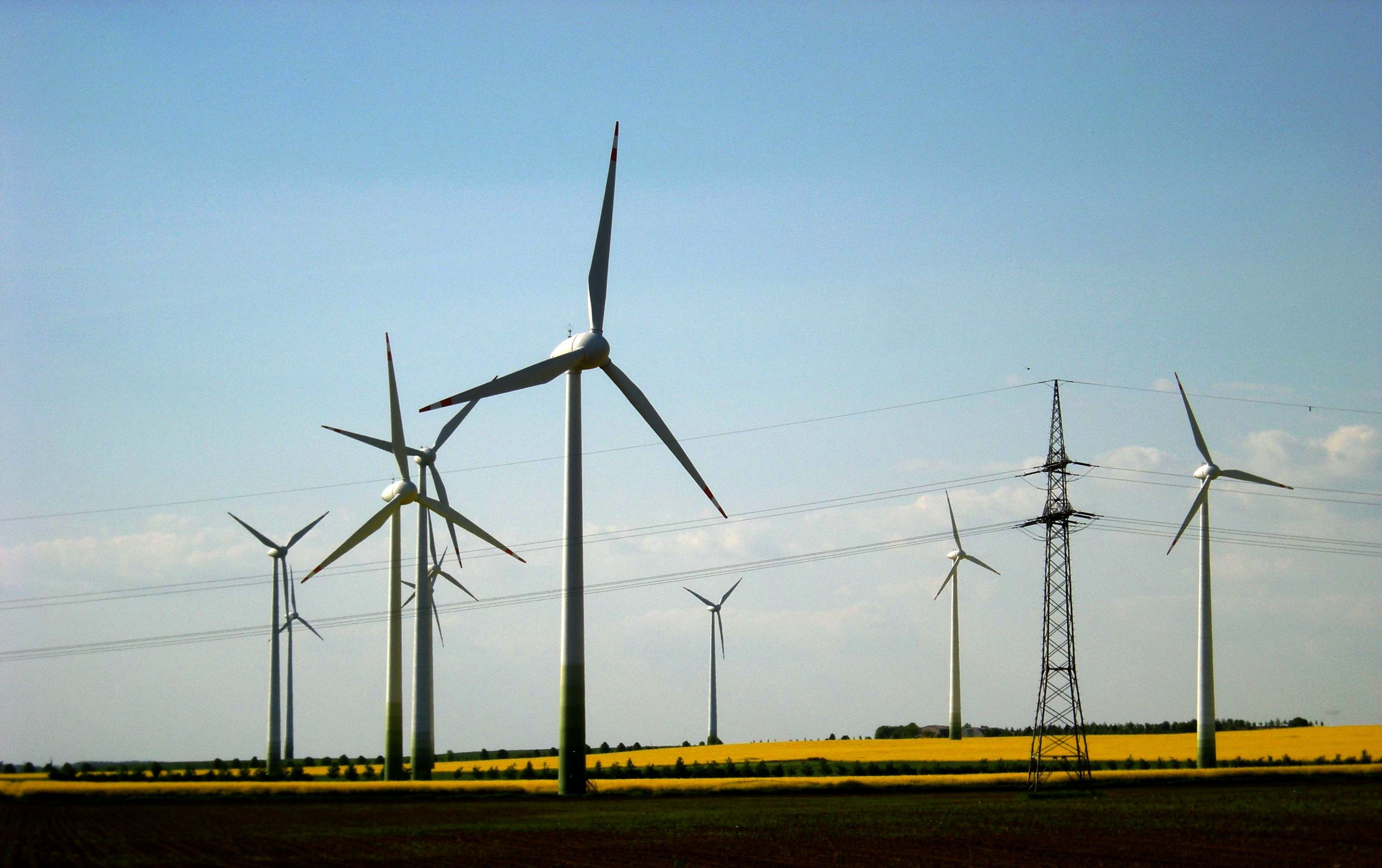
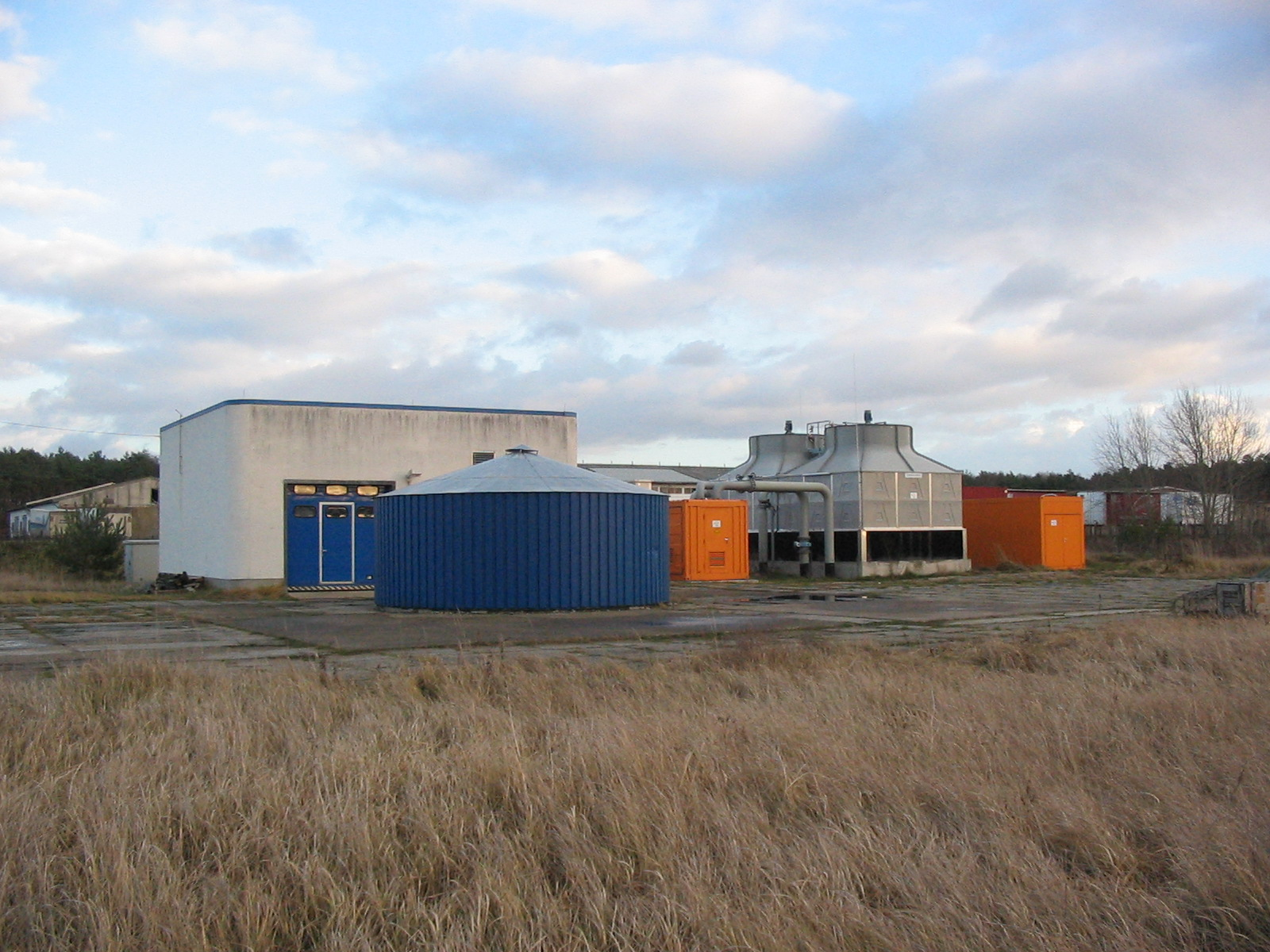
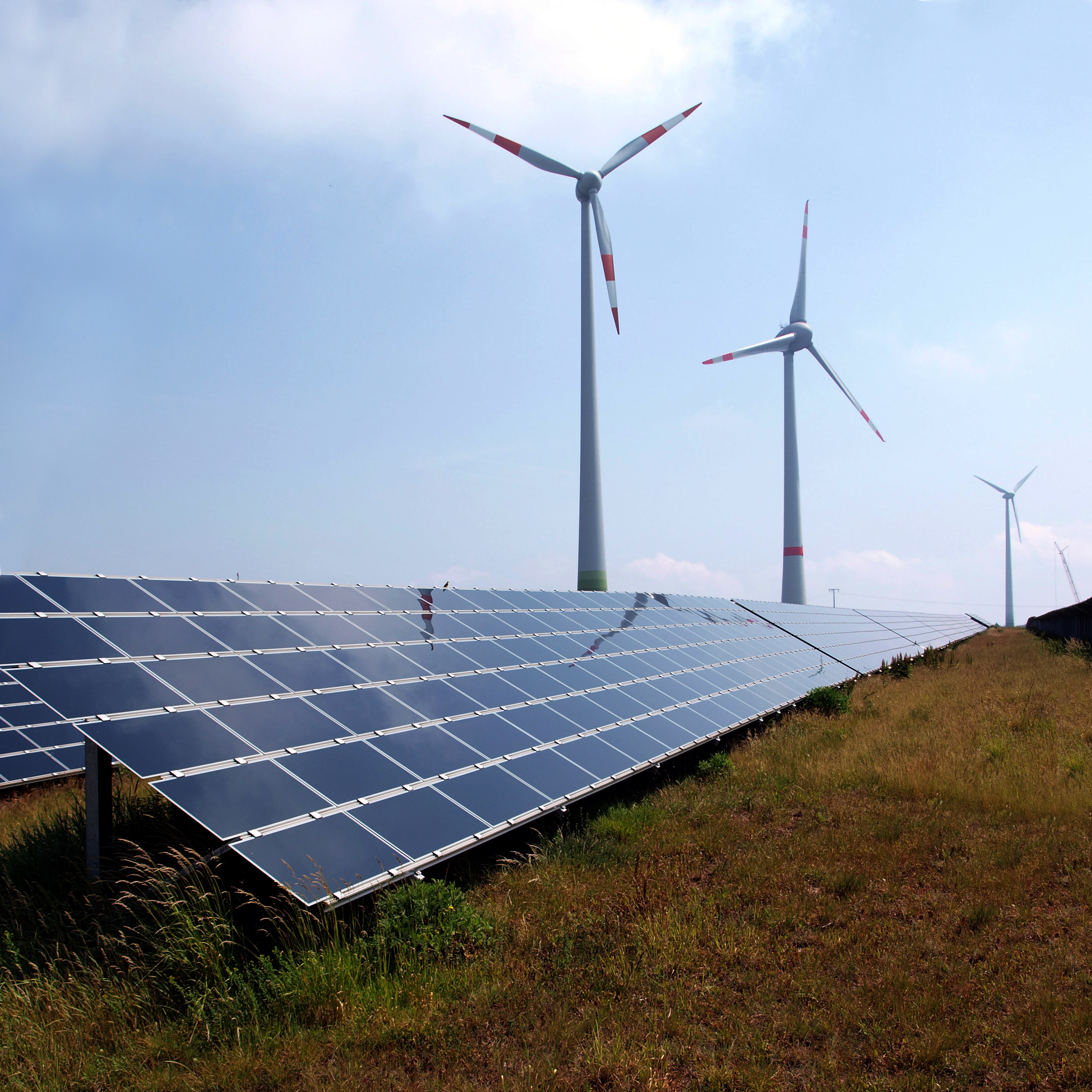
Renewable Energy in Germany (from top left to bottom right):
- Biogas fermenter in Hornstet
- Wind park in Bernburg
- Geothermal power plant in Neustadt-Glewe
- German wind and solar in Rhineland-Palatinate

Renewable energy in Germany comes mainly from wind power, solar power and biomass and is a central component of the country's Energiewende. In 2025, renewable sources accounted for 23.8% of Germany's gross final energy consumption. Their share was highest in the electricity sector, where renewables supplied 55.1% of gross electricity consumption. Wind power accounted for about 25.4%, solar photovoltaics for 17.4%, biomass for about 9.1%, and hydroelectricity for 3.2%. Renewable shares were lower in heating, at 19.0%, and in transport, at 8.0%.

Germany was an early leader in the deployment of renewable energy. In 2009, it was described as "the world's first major renewable energy economy". Germany remained the country with the world's largest installed photovoltaic capacity through 2014.

The Renewable Energy Sources Act (EEG) has been a major driver of the expansion of renewable electricity in Germany. It sets a target for renewables to account for at least 80% of gross electricity consumption by 2030. The growth of renewable generation has also required substantial expansion of the electricity grid, including major north–south transmission corridors.

Gross generation of electricity by source in Germany 1990–2022 showing the shift from nuclear and coal to renewables and fossil gas

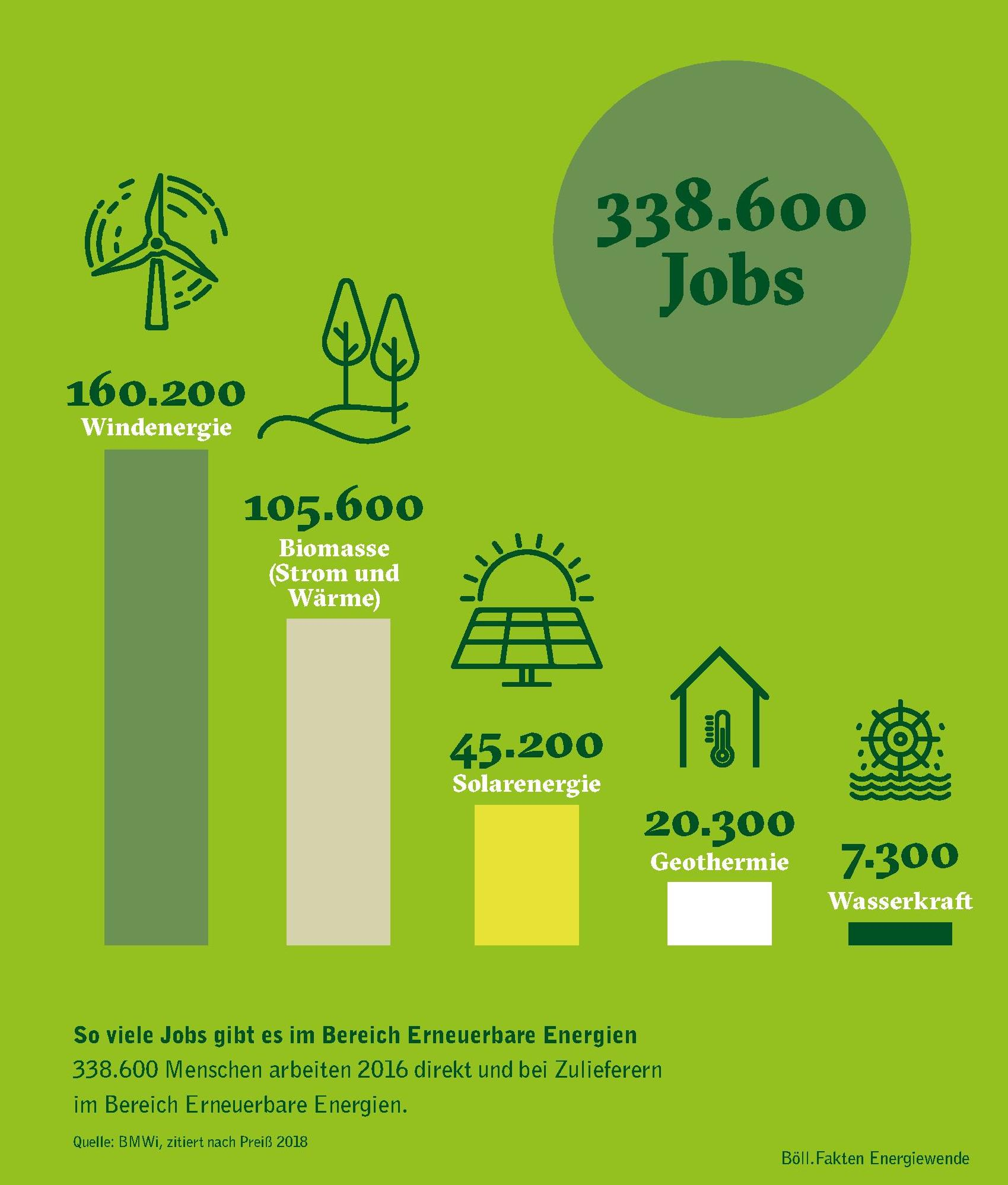
Jobs in the renewable energy sector in Germany in 2018

== Targets ==
German electricity by source in 2025

- Brown coal: 67.13 TW⋅h (16.3%)
- Hard coal: 26.16 TW⋅h (6.3%)
- Natural gas: 53.64 TW⋅h (13.0%)
- Wind: 131.17 TW⋅h (31.8%)
- Solar: 70.13 TW⋅h (17.0%)
- Biomass: 36.06 TW⋅h (8.7%)
- Hydro: 16.72 TW⋅h (4.1%)
- Oil: 2.82 TW⋅h (0.7%)
- Other: 8.93 TW⋅h (2.2%)
Net generated electricity in 2025

Since the passage of the Directive on Electricity Production from Renewable Energy Sources in 1997, Germany and the other states of the European Union were working towards a target of 12% renewable electricity by 2010. Germany passed this target early in 2007, when the renewable energy share in electricity consumption in Germany reached 14%. In September 2010, the German government announced ambitious energy targets: After the 2013 elections, the new CDU/CSU and SPD coalition government continued the energy transition, with only minor modifications of its targets in the coalition agreement. These targets include, for renewable energy:

Renewable energy targets (with actual figures for 2015)
Target	2015	2020	2030	2040	2050
Share of gross final energy consumption	14.9%	18%	30%	45%	60%
Share of gross electricity consumption	31.6%	≥35%	≥50%	≥65%	≥80%
Share of heat consumption	13.2%	14%	N/A	N/A	N/A
Share in transport sector	5.2%	10%	N/A	N/A	N/A

The German Government reported, in 2011, renewable energy (mainly wind turbines and biomass plants) generated more than 123 TWh of electricity, providing nearly 20% of the 603 TWh of electricity supplied. By 2012, all renewable energy accounted for 21.9% of electricity, with wind turbines and photovoltaic providing 11.9% of the total.

As of 2017, renewable sources account for 38% of the net electricity production. Compared to the same period of 2016, energy production from renewable energy sources increased from 182 TWh to 210 TWh. It marks the first year where solar and wind are the biggest source of energy. Power production from nuclear power plants decreased by 10%, due to maintenance. Use of hard coal decreased by 16%, while production from lignite stayed on a similar level and increased for gas by 2.6 TWh.

The renewable installations have come under criticism as well. A balance made in 2017 has shown that whilst emissions in 2016 were 28 percent lower than 1990, the country was likely to fall short of its 2020 target of a 40 percent reduction on 1990 emission levels. The 40 percent reduction target of 2020 will not be met unless "spectacular" additional efforts are made. One significant reason why Germany may miss its 2020 target is because the country's electricity exports have been growing strongly in recent years to surpass France as Europe's largest electricity exporter. A recent study calculates that Germany exports the equivalent of the annual output from 7GW of lignite generation – producing 59 million tonnes of CO_{2} emissions in the process, a figure which accounts for around half of the shortfall in CO_{2} emissions it needs to meet its 2020 targets. Replacing the baseload power from fossil fuels has proven more challenging after nuclear power plants have been shut down although the proportion of electricity generated by coal for domestic use has been falling year on year.

In July 2019, figures published by the Fraunhofer Institute for Solar Energy Systems (ISE) report that renewable energy is for the first time providing more electricity than coal and nuclear power combined in Germany. Solar, wind, biomass and hydroelectric power generates nearly half of the country's output. Times with negative prices increased as solar and wind power increased. Solar and wind power has low marginal cost, and other production sources with higher fuel costs become less competitive when demand and prices are low. During the COVID-19 pandemic in Germany, solar power in Germany occasionally produced 32 gigawatt (GW). Solar, together with wind and other renewables, accounted for 78% of German power at one point.

== Primary energy consumption ==
Source: Federal Ministry for Economic Affairs and Energy, 2000–2017, as per August 2018

As of 2015, Germany's total primary energy consumption is 13,218 petajoules or 3,672 terawatt-hours. The final renewable energy consumption, split by the sectors, and with their relative share, are:

- Electricity sector, with a renewable energy consumption of 31.5% (187.364 GWh)
- Heating sector, with a renewable energy consumption of 13.3% (158.662 GWh)
- Transportation sector, with a renewable energy consumption of 5.3% (33.611 GWh)

As of the end of 2015, renewable energy sources, such as biomass, biogas, biofuels, hydro, wind and solar, accounted for 12.4% of the country's primary energy consumption, a more than doubling compared to 2004, when renewables only contributed 4.5%.

Although the terms "energy" and "electricity" are often used interchangeably, they should not be confused with one another, as electricity is only one form of energy and does not account for the energy consumed by combustion engines and heat boilers, used in transportation by vehicles and for the heating of buildings.

== Sources ==
=== Wind power ===
In 2024, wind power generated a total of 136.4 TWh of electricity and was the largest contributor to Germany's electricity generation. In 2011, the country's installed capacity of wind power was 29 Gigawatts, which was more than doubled in 2024 with 72.7 GW installed.

Britain has the best potential wind resources in Europe; Germany has far less. Nevertheless in the late 20th century Germany built the largest wind power capacity worldwide. Volkmar Lauber explains this in terms of seven advantages inside Germany:

- A stronger national commitment to renewable energy;
- Superior national governance emphasizing effectiveness;
- Deployment of innovations efficiency and cheaply;
- Administrative efficiency and simplicity;
- Rapid buildup of a domestic equipment industry;
- Emergence of new entrepreneurs more committed to renewable energy than the old established electric companies;
- Outpouring of acceptance and support throughout German society and politics.

=== Biomass ===
The key provider of biomass supply in Germany is supposed to be agriculture. Moreover, 40% of German wood production is also used as a biomass feedstock. The German Federal Research Centre for Forestry and Forest Products claims that there are also reserves which may assist in enlarging the part of forestry in biomass production. Agriculture is the main source of rapeseed oil, which is used for the production of biodiesel and making substrates for the production of biogas.

Biomass used for the production of biogas and biofuels are some of Germany's most important sources of renewable energy. In 2010, biomass accounted for 30% of renewable electricity generation and for 70% of all renewable energy (mostly wood).

Germany has committed to blending 6.25% biofuels in petroleum by 2014 with the Biofuels Quota Act.

=== Photovoltaic solar power ===
Solar photovoltaic (PV) technology generates electricity from sunlight, and it can be used in grid-connected and off-grid applications. They were first mass-produced in the year 2000, when German environmentalists and Eurosolar have succeeded in obtaining the government support for the 100,000 roofs program. In July 2012, a cumulative installed total solar PV power of 29.7 GW was in place. Solar PV provided 72 TW·h in 2024, 14% of the total electricity demand. As solar power installations rise quickly, in January 2025 100 GW installed PV power was reached.

=== Hydroelectricity ===
The total installed hydroelectric capacity in Germany at the end of 2006 was 4.7 GW. Hydropower meets 3.5% of the electricity demand. Latest estimates show, in Germany in 2007, about 9,400 people were employed in the hydropower sector which generated a total turnover of €1.23 billion.

=== Geothermal power ===
Geothermal power in Germany is expected to grow, mainly because of a law that benefits the production of geothermal electricity and guarantees a feed-in tariff. But after a renewable energy law that introduced a tariff scheme of €0.15 (US$0.23) per kilowatt-hour (kWh) for electricity produced from geothermal sources came into effect that year, a construction boom was sparked and the new power plants are now starting to come online.

== Industry ==
Enercon, Nordex, REpower Systems, Siemens, and Fuhrländer are wind-power companies based in Germany. Every third solar panel and every second wind rotor in Germany are German, and German turbines and generators used in hydro energy generation are among the most popular worldwide.

Nearly 800,000 people work in the German environment technology sector; an estimated 214,000 people work with renewables in Germany, up from 157,000 in 2004, an increase of 36%. Estimated German jobs in renewable energy in 2012–2013 were about 370,000.

Siemens chief executive Peter Löscher believes Germany's target of generating 35% of its electricity from renewables by 2020 is achievable – and, most probably, profitable for Europe's largest engineering company. Its "environmental solutions" portfolio, which is firmly focused on renewables, is "already generating more than €27 billion a year, 35 per cent of Siemens' total revenue, and the plan is to grow this to €40 billion by 2015". Ending its involvement in nuclear industry will boost the credibility of Siemens as a purveyor of "green technology".

Germany's main competitors in solar electricity are Japan, the US, and China. In the wind industry, it is Denmark, Spain, and the US.

== Government policy ==
The renewable energy sector benefited when the Alliance '90/The Greens party joined the federal government between 1998 and 2005. Support for renewable energy continued to some degree under the following governments, regardless of composition, including the current CDU/CSU and SPD coalition government starting in 2018 but did not prevent the collapse of German solar panel production. The renewable energy sector was aided initially by the Renewable Energy Sources Act that promotes renewable energy mainly by stipulating feed-in tariffs and recently also market premiums that grid operators must pay for renewable energy fed into the power grid; these premiums were reduced under governments without Green party participation. People who produce renewable energy can sell their 'product' at fixed prices for a period of 20 or 15 years. This has created a surge in the production of renewable energy. In 2012, Siemens estimated the total cost of renewable energy would come to at least €1.4 trillion (US$1.8 trillion) by 2030.

For the 2011–2014 period, the federal government set aside 3.5 billion euros for scientific research in the country. Additionally, in 2001 a law was passed requiring the closing of all nuclear power plants within a period of 32 years. The shutdown time was extended to 2040 by a new government in 2010. After the Fukushima incident, the law was abrogated and the end of nuclear energy was set to 2022. After the 2013 federal elections, the new CDU/CSU and SPD coalition in important areas continued the Energiewende of the previous government, but also agreed on a major revision of the EEG.

The German energy policy is framed within the European Union, and the March 2007 European Council in Brussels approved a mandatory energy plan that requires a 20% reduction of carbon dioxide emissions before the year 2020 and the consumption of renewable energies to be 20% of total EU consumption (compared to 7% in 2006). The accord indirectly acknowledged the role of nuclear energy — which is not commonly regarded as renewable, but emissions-free — in the reduction of the emission of greenhouse gases, allowing each member state to decide whether or not to use nuclear-generated electricity.

A compromise was reached to achieve a minimum quota of 10% biofuels in the total consumption of gasoline and diesel in transport in 2020.

== Energy transition ==
Energiewende ("energy transition") designates a significant change in energy policy: The term encompasses a reorientation of policy from demand to supply and a shift from centralized to distributed generation (for example, producing heat and power in very small cogeneration units), which should replace overproduction and avoidable energy consumption with energy-saving measures and increased efficiency.

The key policy document outlining the Energiewende was published by the German government in September 2010, some six months before the Fukushima nuclear accident. In addition, there will be an associated research and development drive. Legislative support was passed in September 2010. Important aspects include:

Key Energiewende policy targets (with actual figures for 2015)
Target	2015	2020	2030	2040	2050
Greenhouse gas emissions (base year 1990)*	−27.2%	−40%	−55%	−70%	−80% to −95%
Renewable energy share of gross final energy consumption	14.9%	18%	30%	45%	60%
Renewable energy share of gross electricity consumption	31.6%	≥35%	≥50%	≥65%	≥80%
Primary energy consumption (base year 2008)	−7.6%	−20%	up	to	−50%
Gross electricity consumption (base year 2008)	−4.0%	−10%	up	to	−25%
*Provisional figure for 2015

The policy has been embraced by the German federal government and has resulted in a huge expansion of renewables, particularly wind power. Germany's share of renewables has increased from around 5% in 1999 to 22.9% in 2012, reaching close to the OECD average of 18% usage of renewables. Producers have been guaranteed a fixed feed-in tariff for 20 years, guaranteeing a fixed income. Energy co-operatives have been created, and efforts were made to decentralize control and profits. The large energy companies have a disproportionately small share of the renewables market. Nuclear power plants were closed, and the existing nine plants will close earlier than planned, in 2022.

In May 2013, the International Energy Agency commended Germany for its commitment to developing a comprehensive energy transition strategy, ambitious renewable energy goals, and plans to increase efficient energy use and supported this approach. Nevertheless, the scale of Germany's energy policy ambitions, coupled with the large size and energy intensity of its economy, and its central location in Europe's energy system, mean further policy measures must be developed if the country's ambitious energy transition is to maintain a workable balance between sustainability, affordability, and competitiveness.

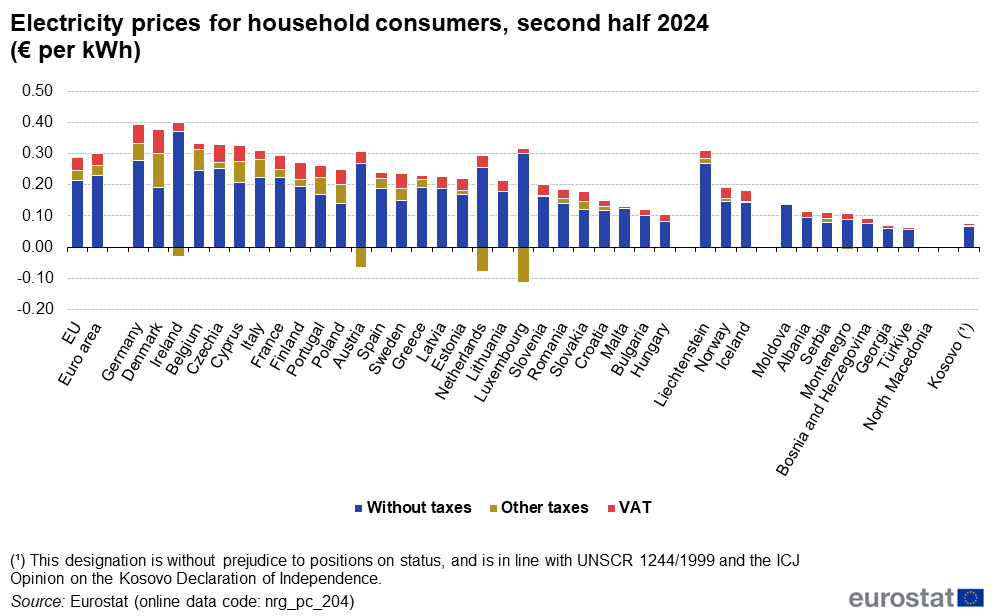
Electricity prices for EU household consumers

Subsidies aimed at stimulating the growth of renewables have driven up consumer energy prices by 12.5% in 2013. To date, German consumers have absorbed the costs of the Energiewende, but the IEA says the debate over the social and economic impacts of the new approach has become more prominent as the share of renewable energy has continued to grow alongside rising electricity prices. The transition to a low-carbon energy sector requires public acceptance, and, therefore, retail electricity prices must remain at an affordable level. Generally, German electricity prices are among the highest in Europe, despite average wholesale prices. At the same time, the IEA said the new energy policy is based on long-term investment decisions, and a strong policy consensus in Germany in favour of large-scale renewable energy commercialisation exists.

The Energiewende has been subject to a number of computer studies. Most concentrate on electricity generation and consumption as this sector is undergoing a rapid transition in terms of technologies and institutions.

== Ownership ==
In Germany, citizens have formed energy communities to invest jointly in wind farms and rooftop solar installations. Renewable energy cooperatives are one form of collective ownership. Medium-sized and larger wind projects are often organised as limited partnerships.

Private citizens held an estimated 30.2% of Germany's installed renewable energy capacity in 2020.

== Statistics ==
Increases in installed renewable electric power capacity and generation in recent years is shown in the charts and table below:

Electricity generation from renewables since 1990 (in GWh, excluding geothermal)
Hydro Waste incineration Onshore Wind Offshore Wind Solar PV Biomass

Year	Installed capacity [MW]	Electric gross generation in gigawatt-hours [GWh] by renewable sources since 1990								Share of gross electricity consumption [%]
Year	Installed capacity [MW]	Hydro	Wind		Biomass	Biogenic waste incineration	Photovoltaics	Geothermal	Total generation	Share of gross electricity consumption [%]
Year	Installed capacity [MW]	Hydro	onshore	offshore	Biomass	Biogenic waste incineration	Photovoltaics	Geothermal	Total generation	Share of gross electricity consumption [%]
1990	4,718	17,426	72	–	222	1,213	1	–	18,934	3.4
1991	4,826	14,891	102	–	260	1,211	1	–	16,465	3.1
1992	4,918	17,397	281	–	296	1,262	4	–	19,240	3.6
1993	5,190	17,878	612	–	432	1,203	3	–	20,128	3.8
1994	5,548	19,930	927	–	569	1,306	7	–	22,739	4.3
1995	6,223	21,780	1,530	–	662	1,348	7	–	25,327	4.7
1996	6,694	21,957	2,073	–	755	1,343	12	–	26,140	4.7
1997	7,255	17,357	3,025	–	876	1,397	18	–	22,673	4.1
1998	8,301	17,216	4,579	–	1,638	1,618	35	–	25,086	4.5
1999	10,155	19,647	5,639	–	1,845	1,740	30	–	28,091	5.2
2000	12,330	21,732	9,703	–	2,887	1,844	60	–	36,226	6.3
2001	15,157	22,733	10,719	–	3,355	1,859	76	–	38,742	6.6
2002	18,824	23,124	16,102	–	4,099	1,949	162	–	45,436	7.7
2003	22,099	17,722	19,087	–	6,603	2,238	313	–	45,963	7.6
2004	25,340	20,095	26,019	–	8,218	2,253	557	0.2	57,142	9.3
2005	29,040	19,638	27,774	–	11,102	3,252	1,282	0.2	63,048	10.2
2006	32,849	20,008	31,324	–	14,793	3,907	2,220	0.4	72,252	11.6
2007	36,046	21,170	40,507	–	19,832	4,531	3,075	0.4	89,115	14.3
2008	39,119	20,443	41,385	–	23,343	4,671	4,420	18	94,280	15.2
2009	47,960	19,031	39,382	38	26,563	4,323	6,583	19	95,939	16.4
2010	57,310	20,953	38,371	176	29,178	4,746	11,729	28	105,181	17.0
2011	68,166	17,671	49,280	577	32,136	4,755	19,599	19	124,037	20.3
2012	78,864	21,755	50,948	732	38,252	4,951	26,380	25	143,043	23.5
2013	84,703	22,998	51,819	918	40,098	5,415	31,010	80	152,338	25.1
2014	91,275	19,587	57,026	1,471	42,218	6,069	36,056	98	162,525	27.4
2015	98,818	18,977	72,340	8,284	44,558	5,768	38,726	133	188,786	31.5
2016	105,419	20,546	67,650	12,274	44,998	5,930	38,098	175	189,671	31.6
2017	113,524	20,150	88,018	17,675	44,961	5,956	39,401	163	216,324	36.0
2018	120,358	17,974	90,484	19,467	44,707	6,163	45,784	178	224,757	37.8
2019	126,547	20,192	101,270	24,705	44,630	5,783	47,517	196	244,293	42.1
2020	132,437	18,721	104,796	27,306	47,169	5,820	49,500	231	253,543	45.4
2021	139,947	19,657	92,075	24,373	47,057	5,792	50,914	244	240,112	41.8
2022	150,283	17,625	99,149	25,124	46,581	5,628	62,083	206	256,396	46.4
2023	169,719	19,895	117,877	23,887	43,681	5,701	65,068	195	276,304	53.0
2024	191,316	22,481	113,749	26,064	44,131	5,544	75,493	215	287,677	54.4
2025	214,459	17,080	107,608	26,553	42,250	5,586	92,200	226	291,503	55.1
Source (1990–2019): Federal Ministry for Economic Affairs and Energy (German: Bundesministerium für Energie und Wirtschaft) Version (1990–2019): October 2020. Source (2020–2025): Umweltbundesamt (UBA), AGEE-Stat Version (2020–2025): September 2026 (partially provisional). Note: column "Biomass" contains all generated electricity from biomass, biofuels and biogas, excluding generation from biogenic waste incineration

Generation from hydro since 1990 (in GWh)
Generation from onshore and offshore wind since 1990 (in GWh)
Generation from solar PV since 1990 (in GWh)
Generation from biomass, biofuel, biogas since 1990 (in GWh) (without biogenic waste incineration)

== Public opinion ==
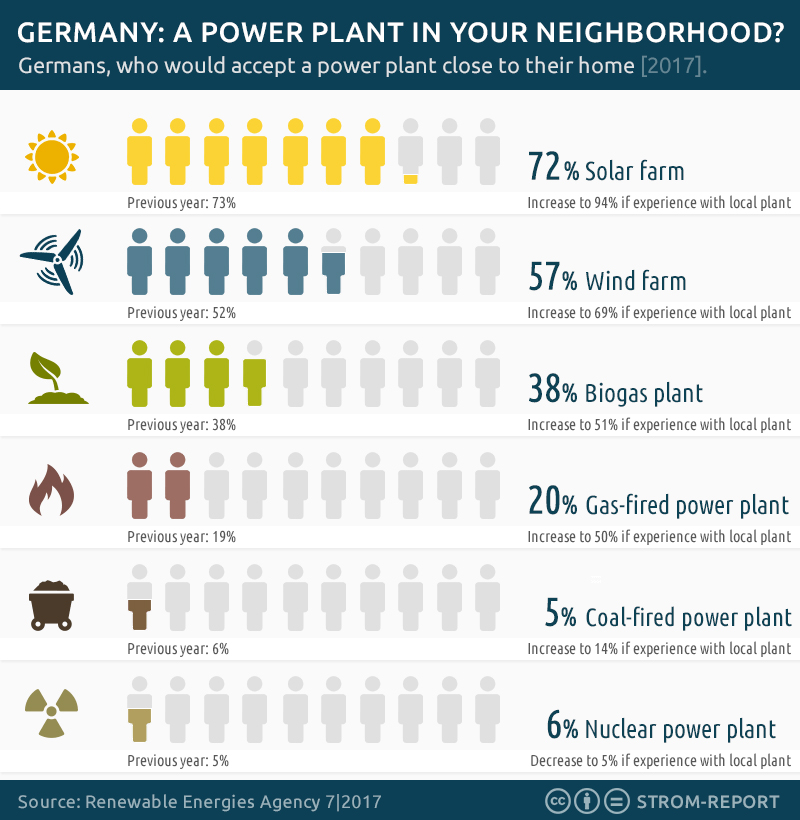
Survey of public opinion: Germans, who would accept a power plant close to their home.

According to a 2017 national survey conducted for the German Renewable Energies Agency, of 1016 respondents 95% supported further expanding renewable energy. Almost two-thirds of the interviewees agreed to renewable power plants close to their homes, with the support increasing further if respondents already had experience with such plants in their neighborhood. With solar farms it increased from 72 to 94%, with wind power from 57 to 69%, and with biofuels from 39 to 56%.

== See also ==
- 100% renewable energy
- Amory Lovins
- Dunkelflaute
- Energy in Germany
- Energy policy of the European Union
- Geothermal power in Germany
- Germany National Renewable Energy Action Plan
- German Solar Industry Association
- Hermann Scheer
- List of countries by renewable electricity production
- Passivhaus
- Renewable energy commercialization
- Renewable energy in the European Union
- Renewable energy by country
- Solar power in Germany
- The Fourth Revolution: Energy
- Wind power in Germany
- Wildpoldsried
