= Som Energia =

Spanish renewable energies cooperative

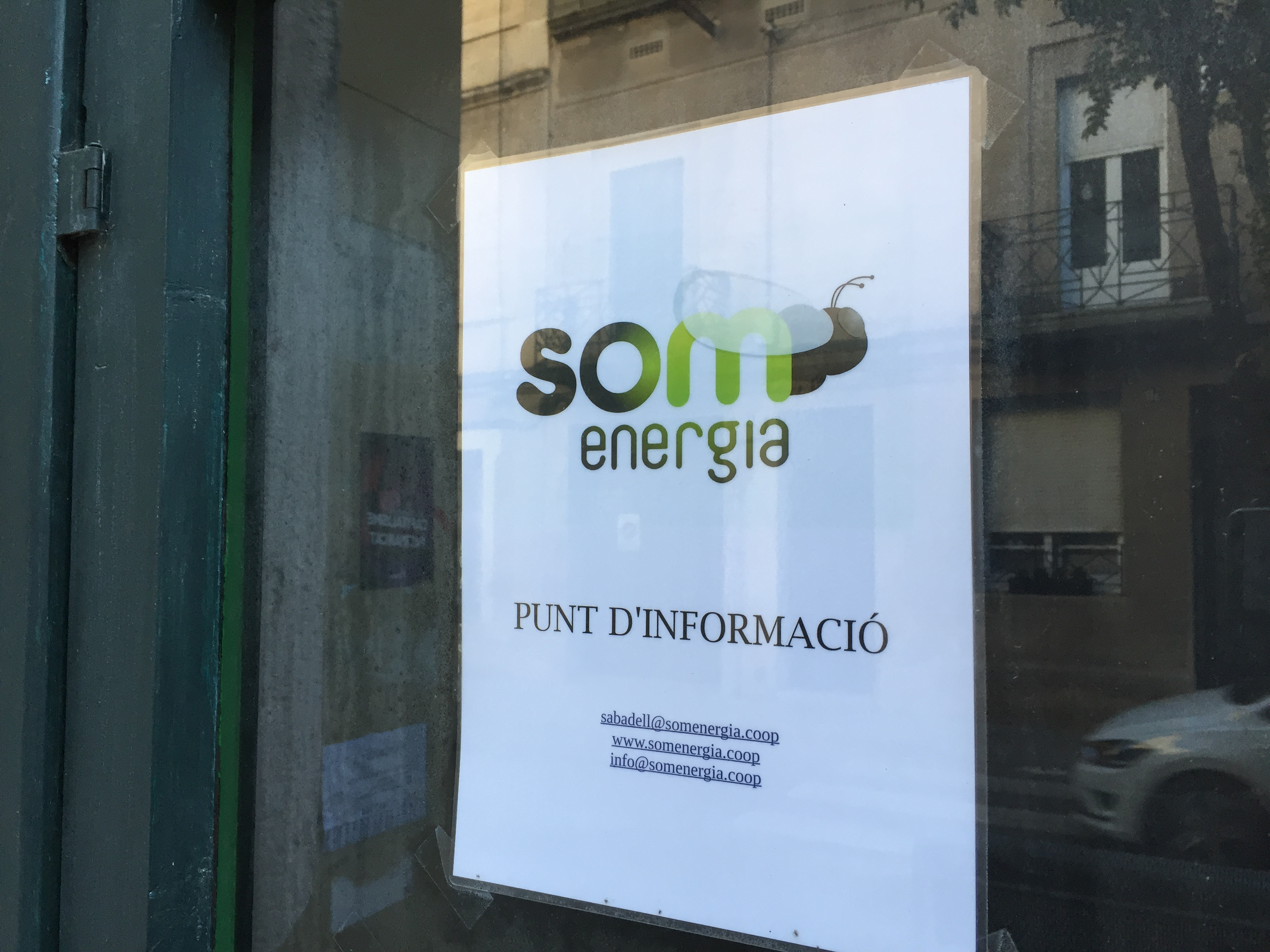
Som Energia info point

Som Energia is a Spanish renewable energies cooperative that was officially founded in December 2010 in Girona, Catalonia, making it the first of its kind in Spain. The project to create the cooperative was begun in November 2009 by a group of former students and lecturers at University of Girona and other contributors, with the objective of setting up something similar to initiatives such as Ecopower (Belgium) or Enercoop (France). Som Energia intends to offer its members the possibility of consuming energy from sources that are 100% renewable at a price similar to conventional energy, as well as developing its own renewable energy projects. In January 2019, the cooperative had over 54.300 members, had invested over 13 million euro in renewable energy production projects had produced over 11.80 GWh and employed 47 people.

It is a member of REScoop, the European federation of renewable energy cooperatives.
