= Ecopower =

Ecopower or EcoPower is a portmanteau word. It may refer to:

- A design feature of the Saab H automobile engine;
- A system developed by Pratt & Whitney to clean the interior working parts and surfaces of jet engines
- Ecopower (cooperative): a Belgian cooperative offering renewable energy.
