= German Solar Industry Association =

The German Solar Industry Association (German: Bundesverband Solarwirtschaft e.V. [BSW-Solar]) is the interest group of the German solar energy industry.

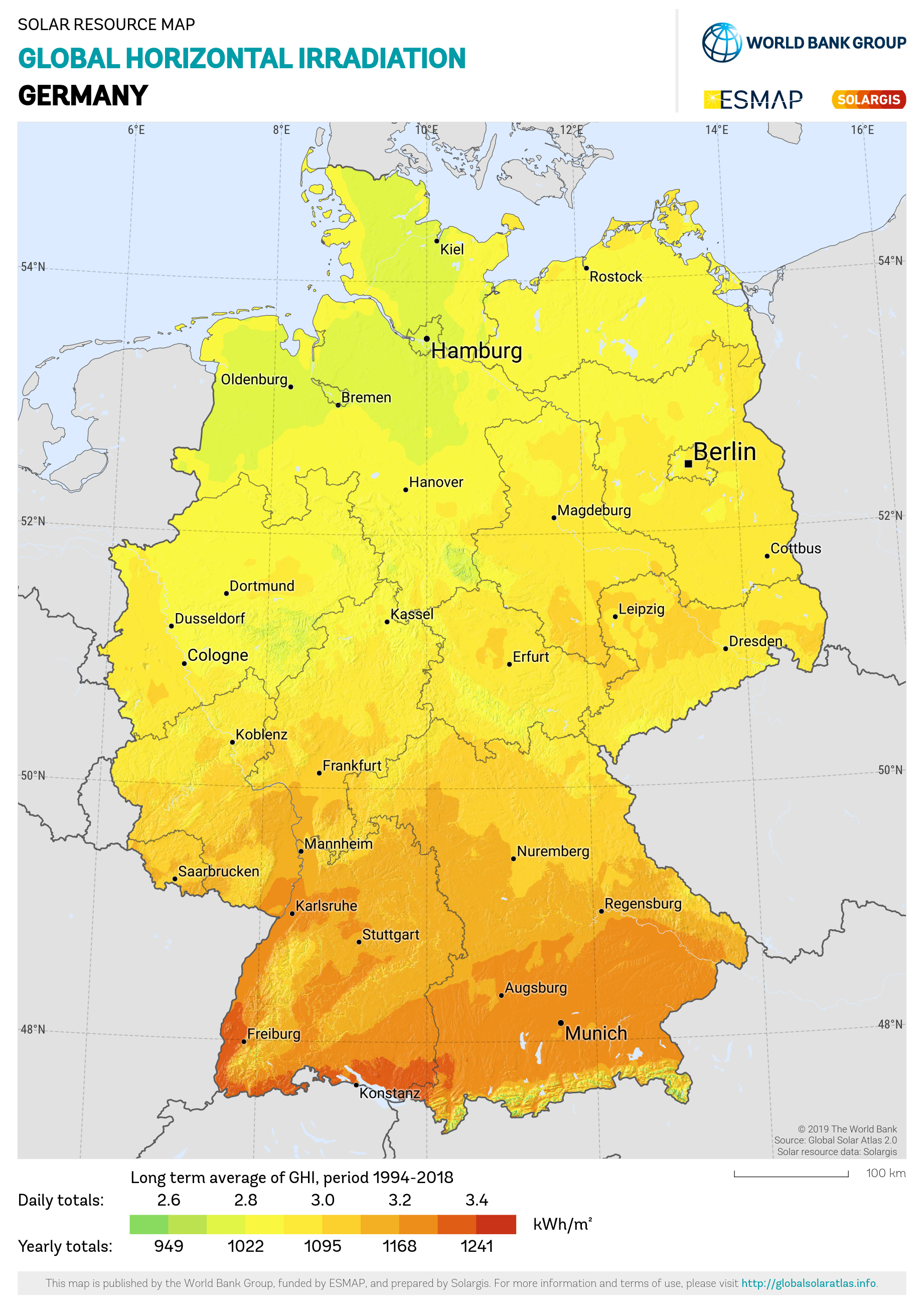
Solar electricity potential in Germany

With more than 800 member companies, BSW-Solar acts as an informant, intermediary and communication channel between the solar businesses and the German government. BSW-Solar represents the common commercial interests of businesses within the solar energy value chain and exerts decisive influence on creating and securing a suitable policy framework for stable growth, and thus on ensuring investment security throughout the solar industry. It is the association’s objective to establish solar energy as a firm pillar of a global energy supply.

BSW-Solar assists its members with legal issues, informs about support policies, and secures stable framework conditions for the industry. The aim is to support the implementation of solar energy as a crucial part of the energy mix and to strengthen the competitiveness of the solar technologies compared to other energy sources. BSW-Solar also initiates internal market research and feasibility studies to provide first hand information to its members. It delivers international business contacts, publishes guidelines and provides policy advice on how to develop new solar markets.

According to its own reference the association tries to establish a positive corporate- and in-dustry identity. BSW-Solar has initiated the largest national solar campaign “Week of the sun (ger: Woche der Sonne)” to enhance public awareness. The campaign is supported by the Federal Ministry for the Environment (ger: Bundesministerium für Umwelt, Naturschutz und Reaktorsicherheit) and distributes comprehensive informative material in many German cities and local communities as well as to manufactures, companies and installers.

== See also ==
- Renewable energy in Germany
- Solar power in the European Union
- Solar power in Germany
