= REScoop Vlaanderen =

REScoop Vlaanderen is the energy cooperative for renewable energy in Flanders, Belgium.

It was created in 2011 on the initiative of the Flemish energy cooperative Ecopower. REScoop Vlaanderen is a member of the European group of cooperatives for renewable energy, REScoop.eu.

RESCoop stands for Renewable Energy Sources Cooperatives. A co-operative (also known as co-op, cooperative or coop) is an autonomous association of persons united voluntary to meet their common economic, social, and cultural needs and aspirations through a jointly owned and democratically controlled business.

The following energy cooperatives are member of RESCoop Vlaanderen:

- Ecopower
- BeauVent
- Wase Wind
- PajoPower
- Energiris
- CORE
- Social Green Energy
- Campina Energy
- Bronsgroen
