= Ecopower (cooperative) =

Belgian cooperative

- Type: Cooperative
- Industry: Renewable energy
- Founded: 1991; 35 years ago
- Headquarters: Berchem, Antwerp, Belgium
- Products: Renewable electricity
- Members: 73,026 (2025)
- Number of employees: 53 (2025)
- Website: www.ecopower.be

Ecopower is a Belgian supplier of renewable electricity. Founded in 1991, the cooperative operates and finances renewable energy projects in Flanders. It develops and owns wind turbines, solar installations and small hydropower plants. It also develops district heating networks and supplies electricity to its members.

Ecopower is a member of REScoop Vlaanderen and the European federation REScoop.eu.

== History ==
Dirk Vansintjan and his colleagues founded Ecopower in Rotselaar on 18 October 1991. It initially provided loans for the construction and restoration of small hydropower plants.

Ecopower won Eeklo’s tender for a wind energy project in 1999. Two turbines entered service in June 2001 and a third in February 2002. Following the liberalisation of the electricity market in Flanders in 2003, Ecopower began supplying electricity directly to its members. By the end of 2010, it had 30,473 members.

Ecopower and the French cooperative Enercoop served as models for Som Energia, founded in Spain in 2010. It was one of the four founding cooperatives of REScoop.eu in 2013, together with Enercoop, Som Energia and De Windvogel.

== Activities ==
The cooperative buys and builds renewable energy installations in Belgium. Its wind projects include turbines in Eeklo, Gistel and Ghent. It also owns solar installations and, since 2004, the small hydropower plant at the mill in Rotselaar.

In 2020 and 2021, Ecopower and the energy cooperative ECoOB installed solar panels on public buildings in Leuven. Residents could invest by buying shares in either cooperative. Most of the electricity is consumed in the buildings where it is generated and the surplus is fed into the grid.

In 2019, Ecopower, ZuidtrAnt-W and Kelvin Solutions established Warmte Verzilverd to develop a district heating network. Waste heat from the Agfa-Gevaert factory provides heating and hot water through the network to homes and businesses in Mortsel, Edegem and Berchem.

== See also ==
- List of renewable energy companies by country
