= Energy community =

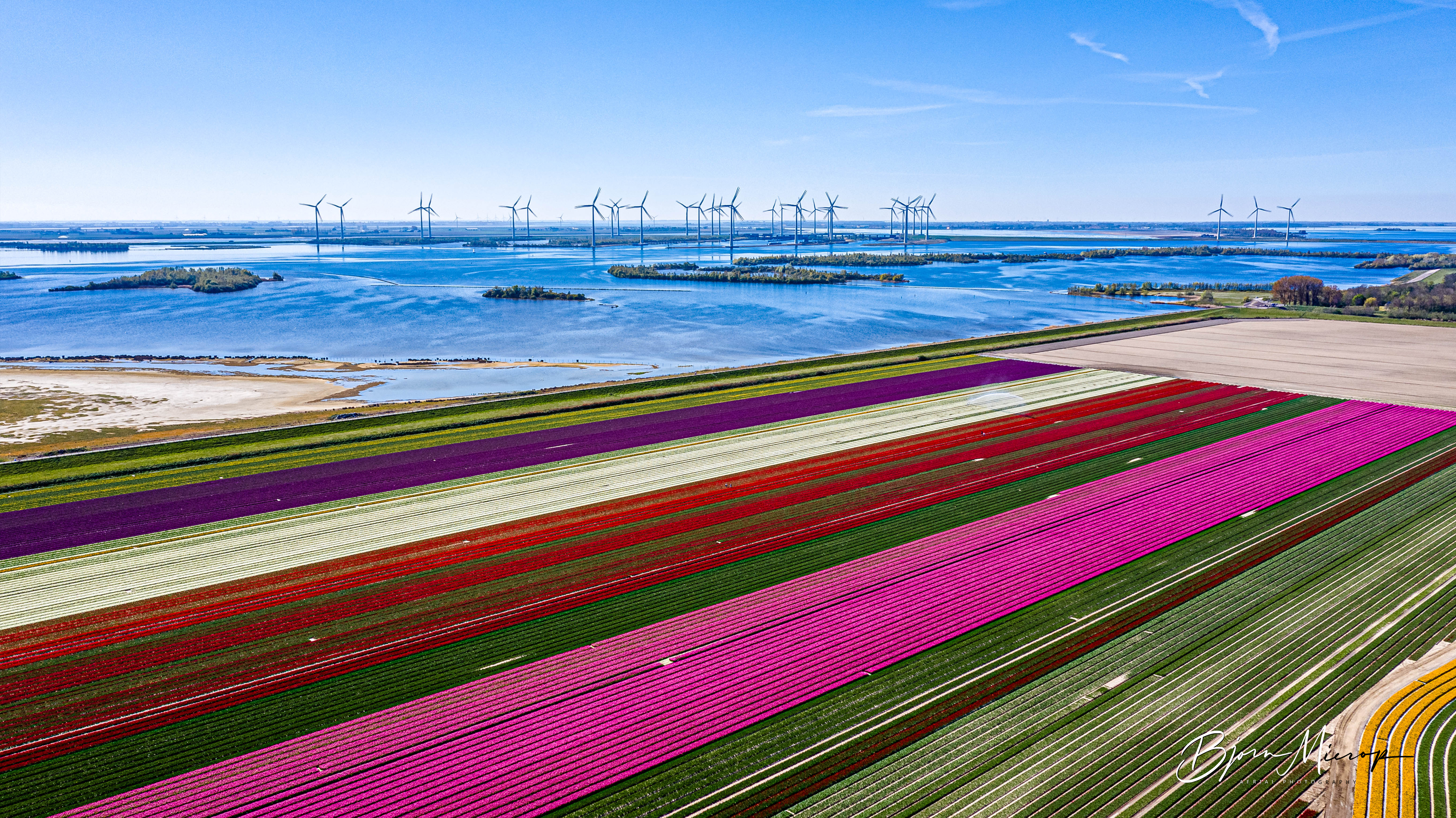
Windpark Krammer in the Netherlands

An energy community is a group of people or organisations that work together to produce, share or supply energy. Its members might jointly own a wind farm, share electricity from solar panels or run a local heating network. Who makes decisions and who benefits can vary from one project to another.

European Union law recognises two types of energy community. Renewable energy communities can produce renewable electricity or heat and are controlled by members or shareholders located near their projects. Citizen energy communities can generate electricity from renewable or non-renewable sources, share it among their members, and provide services such as energy storage and electric vehicle charging. The primary purpose of both types is to provide environmental, economic or social benefits to their members or the areas where they operate.

== Organisation and projects ==
Renewable energy installations on the Danish island of Samsø

Residents, businesses and local authorities can establish energy communities through cooperatives and associations. Their activities range from owning wind farms and solar installations to sharing electricity and supplying heat through local networks.

In the Netherlands, the energy cooperatives Deltawind and Zeeuwind jointly own 60% of Windpark Krammer, a 102 MW wind farm. The cooperatives use some of the money they receive from the wind farm to fund other renewable energy projects and local initiatives. In Zbůch, Czechia, an energy community shares electricity from a biogas plant and solar installations.

In the bioenergy village of Kněžice, Czechia, a municipally owned company operates a biogas plant and biomass boilers. The biomass boilers provide heating for the village, and the biogas plant produces electricity for the public grid.

In Eeklo, Belgium, the municipality helps low-income households join the Ecopower cooperative by advancing the cost of a share. Ecopower also distributes part of its earnings to members as dividends.

== European Union framework ==
The European Union introduced two types of energy community as part of its Clean Energy for All Europeans package. The 2018 Renewable Energy Directive (RED II) defined renewable energy communities, and the 2019 Electricity Market Directive defined citizen energy communities. Their purpose is to provide environmental, economic or social benefits to their members, shareholders or the areas where they operate rather than to make financial profits.

=== Renewable energy community ===
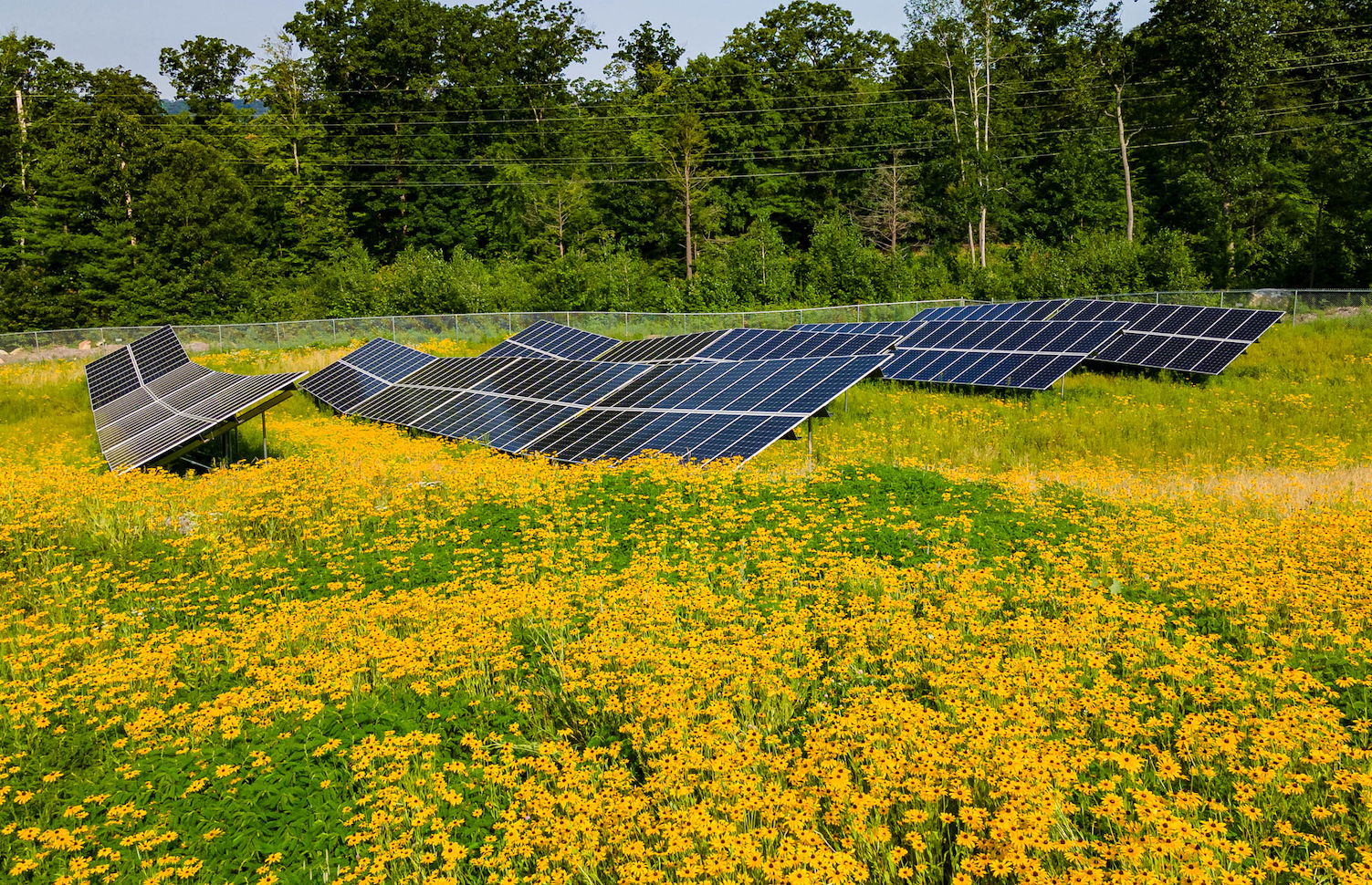
A community solar farm

A renewable energy community is an autonomous legal entity. Individuals, small and medium-sized enterprises, and local authorities, including municipalities, may be members or shareholders. Effective control rests with members or shareholders located near the renewable energy projects that the community owns and develops.

Renewable energy communities can produce, consume, store and sell renewable energy. They can also share renewable energy produced by generating units they own among their members or shareholders.

=== Citizen energy community ===
A citizen energy community is a legal entity controlled by members or shareholders who are individuals, local authorities or small enterprises. The directive sets no equivalent requirement for those in control to be located near a project.

Citizen energy communities can generate electricity from renewable or non-renewable sources and provide services such as electricity supply, storage and electric vehicle charging. They can share electricity from generating units they own and have access to electricity markets. EU member states may also allow them to own and manage distribution networks.

=== Support programmes ===
The European Energy Communities Facility was established in September 2024 to support the development of energy communities across the EU.

== See also ==
- Energy conservation
- Energy democracy
- Efficient energy use
- Renewable energy
