= Bioenergy village =

Community that uses bioenergy for their complete energy needs

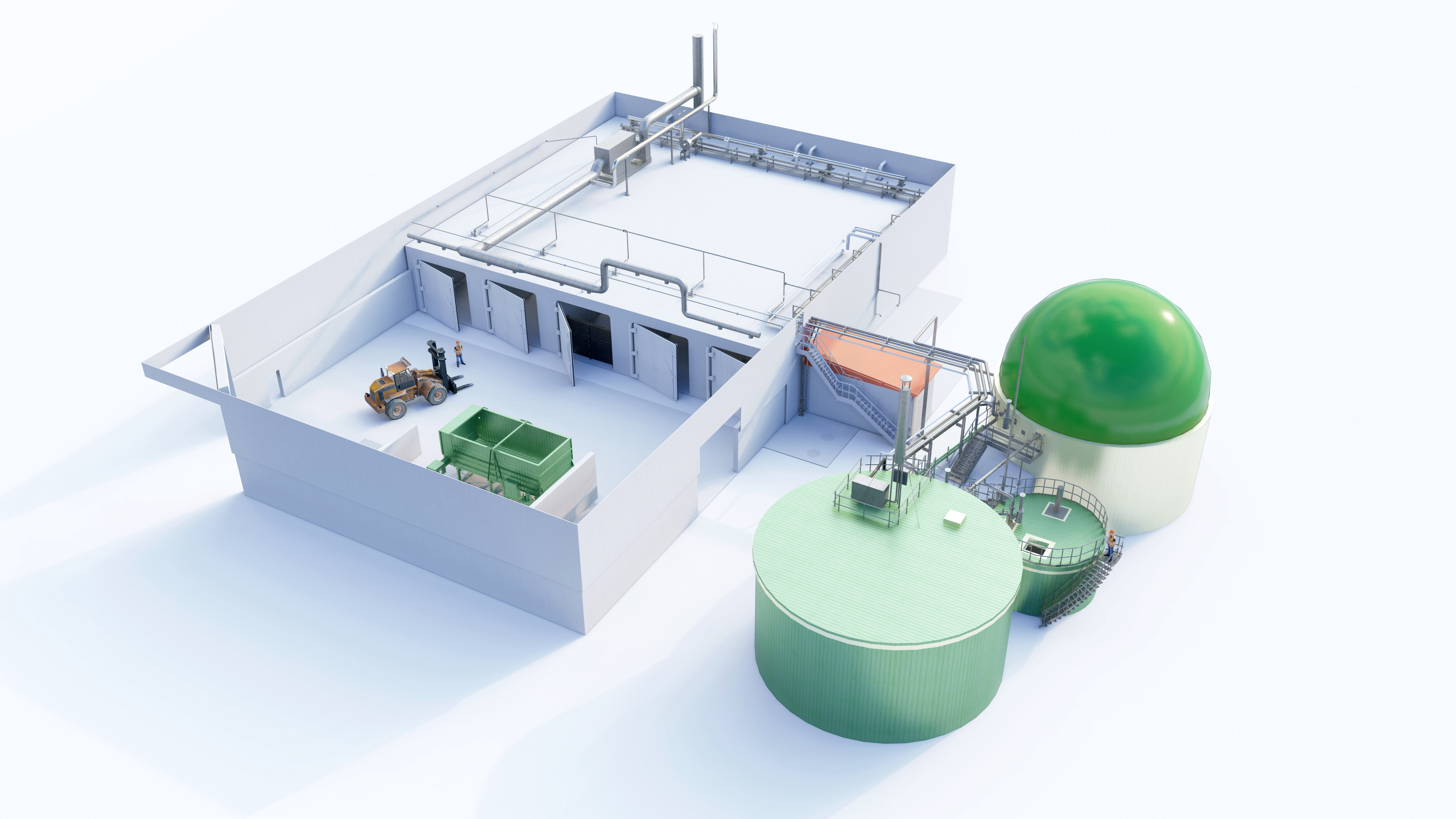
Biogas plant model diagram.

A bio-energy village is a regionally oriented concept for the use of renewable energy sources in rural areas. The system uses biomass from local agriculture and forestry in a biogas powerplant to meet the complete energy requirements of a village, such as electricity and district heating.

These villages tend to be self-powered and independent from external grids, despite being connected to overland grids for feeding surplus energy. The term "bio-energy village" refers to a dependency on fresh biological material as a source of energy only whereas an "ecovillage" includes a variety of networks.

Examples of such villages are Jühnde near Göttingen, Mauenheim near Tuttlingen and Bollewick near Berlin in Germany.

== Energy production ==
Liquid manure, grass, silage and other raw materials from agriculture are fermented in a biological gas facility. The biogas produced fuels a combined heat and power plant (CHP). The heat is distributed via a district heating system while power is fed into a local electricity grid. In winter, additional heat requirements can be supplied by a supplementary heating plant, in which wood chips or straw are burned.

== Existing projects ==
=== Jühnde ===
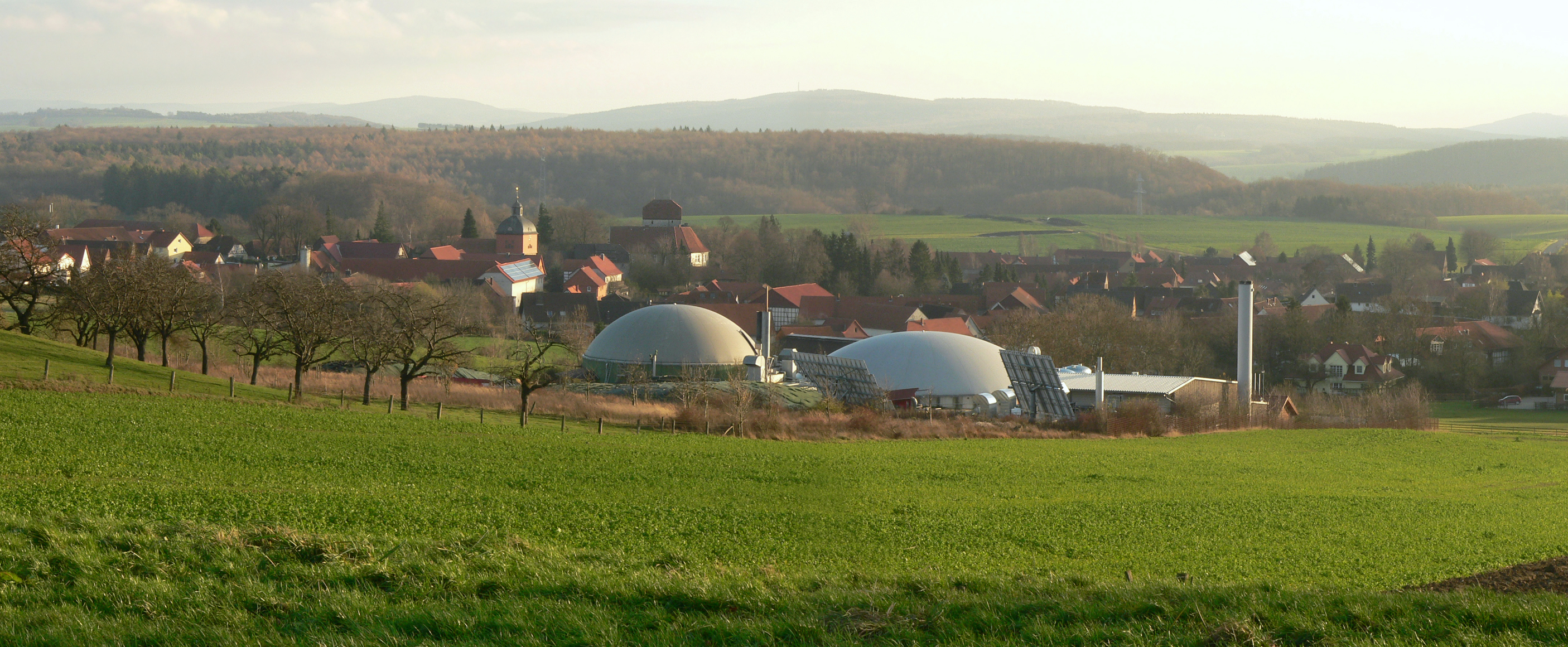
Bio-energy village in Jühnde, Germany.

The first bio-energy village in Germany is Jühnde in the district of Göttingen. It started as a bio-energy village in 2001 with an investment from the German Ministry BMELV and Lower Saxony. A project initiated by the Interdisciplinary Centre For Sustainable Development (IZNE) at the University of Göttingen, and completed in January 2006, the project supplies the village with the heat that it requires and produces twice as much electricity as is used. In this village, biological materials from at least 70 percent of the households are converted to electrical power and heat through a biogas plant. The materials used include liquid manure, whole plant silage of different crops, and wood chips, which fuels a boiler that provides additional heat during winter. It has been estimated that the participating households save €750 per year in energy costs. The community is able to produce 35 percent of its power and 50 percent its heat requirements.

=== Mauenheim ===
In Mauenheim, Baden-Württemberg, a bio-energy village has been developed in Immendingen in the district of Tuttlingen, with approximately 400 inhabitants and 148 buildings. The biogas facility and wood chip heating system are supplemented by a solar energy system. The project started operation in 2006. It has been calculated that about 1900 tonnes of CO_{2} per year will be saved.

=== Rai Breitenbach ===
The Breuberger village of Rai Breitenbach in the Odenwald (approximately 890 inhabitants) is in the process of becoming a bio-energy village. At present the project is still in the planning stage. A feasibility study has been completed and a co-operative created to carry out the project, which is expected to be completed in 2008.

=== Freiamt ===
The village Freiamt in the Black Forest with 4300 inhabitants is using all forms of renewable energy. A biogas plant, Solar power, wind and water energy produce about 14 million kwh energy annually, about 3 million more than needed. Around 150 solar collectors are used for water heating.

== Considerations ==
=== Advantages ===
- No climatically harmful waste gases are released. The risks and waste disposal problem of nuclear energy are avoided.
- The energy produced is often cheaper for consumers than conventional energy.
- Local resources are used, saving transportation energy costs.
- Energy costs are locally spent, strengthening the local economy and creating jobs.

=== Disadvantages ===
- Capital outlays are high.
- The system works only if a large majority of the inhabitants participate, and can be attached to the local heating supply network.
- The gas evolving is not constant in amount, it may differ due to insufficient raw materials.

== See also ==
- Crowdfunding
