= Enercoop =

French electric utility cooperative company

- Company type: SCIC
- Industry: Energy
- Founded: July 29, 2005; 20 years ago
- Founder: Biocoop; Julien Noé; La Nef; Patrick Behm; Réseau Cler; Greenpeace
- Headquarters: Paris, France
- Area served: France
- Key people: Julien Noé (President), Amandine Albizzati (CEO)
- Revenue: 174,831,752 euro (2024)
- Operating income: 8,899,319 euro (2024)
- Net income: 9,432,785 euro (2024)
- Members: 20459 (2019)
- Number of employees: 136 (2020)
- Website: https://www.enercoop.fr/

Enercoop is a French electric utility cooperative company. It uses only renewable energy and is the only electric utility in France to be a cooperative. Its founding members include Greenpeace and other proponents of environmental protection and the ethical economy, such as La Nef, a French cooperative bank and the Friends of the Earth association. As of mid-2014, Enercoop has 20,000 clients.

== History ==
Former logo from 2015.

Enercoop was created in 2005 and initially, as the French electricity market wasn't yet liberalized, Enercoop just had companies as customers. Later on, in 2007, as the market was liberalized, Enercoop started to grow and totalized more than 200 customers.

In 2011, after the Fukushima Daiichi nuclear disaster, Enercoop went from 3,000 customers in 2009 to 10,000 in late 2011.

In 2014, Enercoop had 20,000 customers.

As of 2021, Enercoop had 100,000 customers

== Objectives ==
Its aim is to create many regional cooperatives around France where the local members can be in charge of all parts of the energy process from production to consumption. In this way the group intends to make citizens responsible for the energy they consume. Actually, in 2014, it has 6 regional cooperatives.

Enercoop's articles of association impose that at least 57% of the profits must be reinvested in means of electricity production. The remaining profits can either be reinvested or can reward its investors.
