= REScoop.eu =

European Federation of Renewable Energy Cooperatives

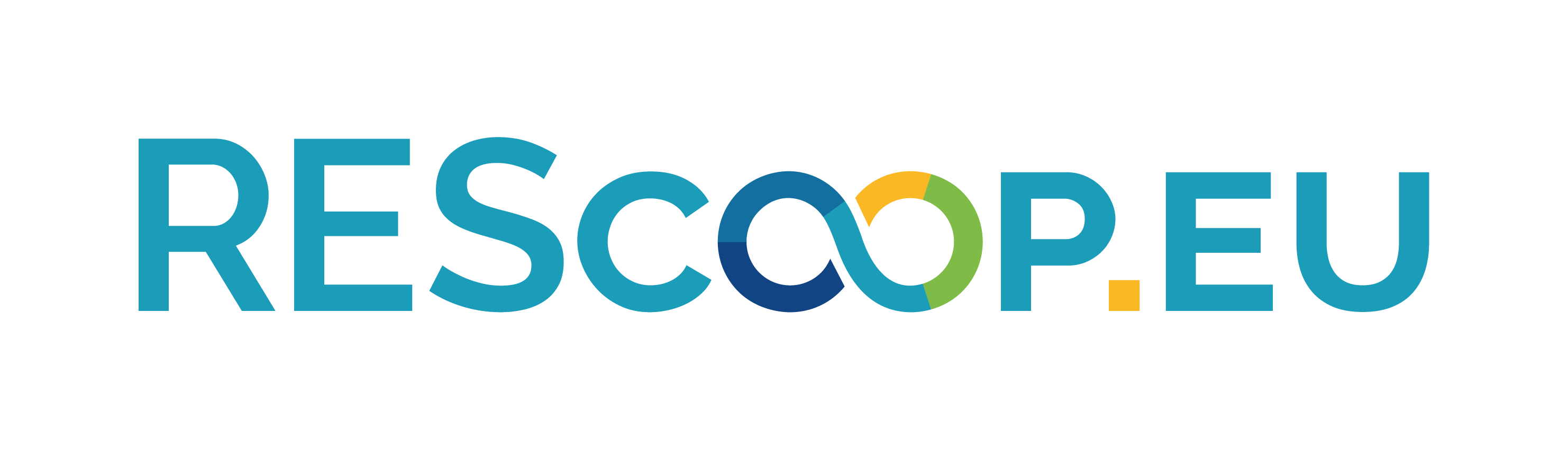
- Founded: 2011; 15 years ago Antwerp, Flanders, Belgium
- Founder: Dirk Vansintjan
- Type: non-governmental organization
- Purpose: energy democracy, renewable energy, and cooperatives
- Headquarters: Brussels, Belgium
- Region served: Europe
- Main organ: Board of directors, elected by the Annual General Meeting
- Website: www.rescoop.eu

REScoop.eu is the European federation of renewable energy cooperatives, founded in 2011.

As of 1 February 2025, it had 121 member organisations (energy communities, regional federations or small businesses and associations) in 25 European countries, representing 2,500 individual REScoops and their 2 million citizens.

On December 24, 2013, the European federation of groups and cooperatives of citizens for renewable energy (REScoop.EU) was legally established under Belgian national law with a European scope, to develop the activities of the federation and build a European renewable energy cooperative alliance.

REScoop is a short term for Renewable Energy Source Cooperative.

== Positions and campaigns ==
REScoop.eu advocates for a decentralized, renewable, efficient, clean and sustainable energy system with citizens at its core, referring to the energy transition as “the energy transition to energy democracy”.
