= Air pollution in Germany =

Air pollution in Germany has significantly decreased over the past decade. Air pollution occurs when harmful substances are released into the Earth's atmosphere. These pollutants are released through human activity and natural sources. Germany took interest in reducing its greenhouse gas (GHG) emissions by switching to renewable energy sources. Renewable energy use rate from 6.3% in 2000 to 34% in 2016. Through the transition to renewable energy sources, some people believe Germany has become the climate change policy leader and renewable energy leader in the European Union (EU) and in the world with ambitious climate change programs, though Germany's CO_{2} emissions per capita are in fact among the highest in Europe, almost twice those of e.g. France. The current goal of the German government was approved on 14 November 2016 in the German Climate Action Plan 2050, which outlines measures by which Germany can meet its greenhouse gas emissions by 2050. By 2050, Germany wants to reduce their GHGs by 80 to 95% and by 2030 they want to reduce it by 55%, compared to the EU target of 40%.

In order to achieve these goals, a variety of strategies and policies are used rather than legislation. The four strategies the German government bases air pollution control on are laying down environmental quality standards, emission reduction requirements according to the best available technology, production regulations, and laying down emission ceilings. Through these strategies, policy instruments have been put in place that have contributed to the success of the significant air pollution reduction in Germany. These instruments include the Federal Emission Control Act and Implementing Ordinances, Technical Instructions on Air Quality Control (TA Luft), Amendment to Ordinance on Small Firing Installations, Implementation of the directive on industrial emissions, and Transboundary air pollution control policy. The German Feed-in-Tariff policy introduced in 2000 led to the significant increase in renewable energy use and decreasing air pollution. They have been introduced in Germany to increase the use of renewables, such as wind power, biomass, hydropower, geothermal power, and photovoltaics, thereby reducing GHG emissions causing air pollution and combating climate change.

The German government has been an agenda setter in international climate policy negotiations since the late 1980s. However, national and global climate policies have become a top priority since the conservative-social democratic government came into power in 2005, pushing both European and international climate negotiations. Positive path dependency in Germany's climate and energy policies has occurred over the past 20 years. There are three main triggers that put Germany on this positive path dependency and what led them to becoming a climate change policy leader. The first being the widespread damages to health, due to smog, and to nature, due to acid rain, caused by air pollution. The second being the shock of the two oil price crises, in 1973 and 1979, that highlighted the problem of the German economy's strong dependence on unsure foreign sources. The third being the growing opposition to the country's growing reliance on nuclear energy. Air pollution began to be seen as a problem in Germany due to these three triggers, causing Germany to put policies into place to control air pollution. This has now developed from controlling air pollution to being a leader in climate change politics.

== Background ==
Air pollution may cause diseases, allergies, or death in humans. It may also cause harm to other living organisms, such as animals and crops, and may cause damage to the environment. Air pollution can be generated by both human activity and natural processes.

An air pollutant is a substance in the air that can have adverse effects on humans and the ecosystem.

The major primary pollutants produced by human activity include:

- Carbon dioxide (CO_{2}) - The most emitted form of human caused air pollution. Emitted by the burning of fossil fuels.
- Sulfur oxides (SO_{x}) - Particularly sulfur dioxide. Produced by the combustion of coal and petroleum.
- NO_{x} (nitrogen oxides, particularly nitrogen dioxide). Produced by high-temperature combustion.
- Carbon monoxide (CO) - Product of incomplete combustion of fuel such as natural gas, coal or wood. Vehicle exhaust is a major source of carbon monoxide.
- Volatile organic compounds (VOC) - Categorized as either methane or non-methane. Methane is an extremely efficient greenhouse gas which contributes to enhanced global warming.
- Ammonia (NH_{3}) - Emitted from agricultural processes.

Secondary pollutants include:

- Particulates created from gaseous primary pollutant and compounds in photochemical smog. Smog is a kind of air pollution and results from large amounts of coal burning in an area caused by a mixture of smoke and sulfur dioxide. Modern smog does not usually come from coal but from vehicular and industrial emissions that are acted on in the atmosphere by ultraviolet light from the sun to form secondary pollutants that also combine with the primary emissions to form photochemical smog.
- Ground-level ozone (O_{3}) formed from NO_{x} and VOCs. Abnormally high concentrations are brought about by human activities (mostly the combustion of fossil fuel), it is a pollutant, and a constituent of smog.

=== Sources ===
There are various locations, activities or factors which are responsible for releasing pollutants.

==== Anthropogenic (man-made) sources ====
These are mostly related to the burning of multiple types of fuel.

- Stationary sources include smoke stacks of power plants, factories, waste incinerators, furnaces and other types of fuel-burning heating devices.
- Mobile sources include motor vehicles, marine vessels, and aircraft.
- Controlled burn practices in agriculture and forest management.
- Fumes from paint, hair spray, varnish, aerosol sprays, and other solvents.
- Waste deposition in landfills, which generate methane.
- Military resources, such as nuclear weapons, toxic gases, germ warfare, and rocketry.

== Historical roots of Germany's air pollution policies ==
"Modern" environmental policies first began to be developed in the 1960s, with the United States, Japan, Sweden, and to some extent Great Britain at the forefront in establishing new environmental institutions, procedures, instruments, standards, and technologies. Learning from these countries, Germany quickly caught up, especially in the area of air pollution control policy. The largest triggers for change were:

1. The widespread damages to health (smog) and nature (acid rain) caused by air pollution.
2. The shock of the two oil price crises (1973 and 1979) that highlighted the problem of the German economy's strong dependence on unsure foreign sources.
3. The growing opposition to the country's growing reliance on nuclear energy.

As early as 1977, green groups participated in elections to district parliaments. In the European elections of 1979, several such groups put up candidates with a "green label", attracting almost one million votes. During the rise of the green party, environmental issues triggered major and partly violent conflicts. Since the late 1980s, a more cooperative policy style developed between the various actor groups and institutions. The high integrative capacity of the German political system and the willingness of the "organized" green movement to become more cooperative are important features explaining the mostly cooperative climate policy that followed in the 1980s.

The integration of a green political party in the political-administrative system distinguishes Germany from the United States and Japan. The German election system is one of proportional representation. Once the 5% hurdle is overcome, a party achieves representation in parliament. The German federal government and the electoral system tend to promote cooperation. The system of proportional representation makes it difficult for any single party to gain enough seats in the parliament to form a government by itself. Therefore, coalition governments are a basic German feature. The system encourages negotiation and consensus politics on and between all levels of government because it applies to all federal, state, and local bodies. These very specific political-cultural preconditions have influenced Germany's policy style in the area of climate change.

The German public has been largely supportive of the German government's initiatives. An increased perception of vulnerability to climate change appears to motivate German citizens to be willing to change in the hopes of spurring necessary global efforts. Germany's vulnerability to the physical effects of climate change is much lower than the risk to the United States, Japan, Australia and Spain. However, risk perceptions among the population are high.

There is also the issue of the perceived economic costs of action. In Germany, in contrast with many other countries, climate action is not considered to be an economic burden. The additional financial burden on the average household has been rather small, although it has increased in the form of a growing tax burden. Although certain measures have clear and distinct costs, there is a growing belief that the broader efforts to move to cleaner technologies have created economic "winners" as well. Green technology and renewable energy sectors have created many new jobs. In addition, the dependency on the world energy market for fossil resources is decreasing, reducing Germany's economic-political vulnerability. Thus, a structural change toward a climate-sensitive energy policy has been adopted with almost no social conflicts. These positive employment and foreign energy policy effects of climate-related policies have played an imported role in the public's climate change discourse.

== Germany's climate change policies ==
Germany is well on the way to meeting the standards of air pollution control set by the EU. For sulfur dioxide and volatile organic compounds it is sufficient to apply the measures already adopted and implemented in the past. However, additional reductions are needed for nitrogen oxides and ammonia. The necessary reductions in nitrogen oxide emissions will be achieved in the transport sector and in stationary installations. The necessary reductions for ammonia emissions will be achieved in the agriculture sector.

=== Strategies for controlling air pollution ===
The German government bases air pollution control on four strategies:

1. Laying down environmental quality standards
2. Emission reduction requirements according to the best available technology
3. Production regulations
4. Laying down emission ceilings

=== Policy instruments for controlling air pollution ===
==== 1. Federal Emission Control Act and Implementing Ordinances ====
Air quality control in Germany is mainly governed by the Act on the Prevention of Harmful Effects on the Environment caused by Air Pollution, Noise, Vibration and similar Phenomena.

==== 2. Technical instructions on air quality control (TA Luft) ====
A modern instrument for German authorities to control air pollution. They contain provisions to protect citizens from unacceptably high pollutant emissions from installations as well as requirements to prevent adverse effects on the environment. It lays down emissions limit values for relevant air pollutants from installations. Existing installations must also be upgraded to the best available technology.

==== 3. Amendment to ordinance on small firing installations ====
This instrument entered into force in March 2010 and was an important step toward reducing particulate matter emissions from small firing installations, such as stoves. The amended requirements for new installations and modernization of existing installations will especially achieve a noticeable average reduction in particulate matter emissions of 5 to 10% in the residential areas concerned.

==== 4. Implementation of the directive on industrial emissions ====
A significant share of the necessary emissions reductions to meet the targets proposed by Germany and the EU will be achieved by the implementation of the directive on industrial emissions.

==== 5. Transboundary air pollution control policy ====
A large proportion of pollution in Germany is due to transportation through the air over long distances from neighbouring countries. Therefore Germany determined it to be important to develop a transboundary air pollution control policy in order to increase the air quality in Germany. For this reason, the German government is actively involved in the constructive dialogue on air pollution control measures at both the European and international level.

== Feed-in tariffs ==
Feed-in tariffs (FiT) for electricity have been introduced in Germany to encourage the use of new energy technologies such as wind power, biomass, hydropower, geothermal power, and solar photovoltaics. Feed-in tariffs are policy mechanisms designed to accelerate investment in renewable energy technologies by providing them with remuneration (a "tariff") above the retail or wholesale rates of electricity. Germany was the first country to implement feed-in tariffs by passing its Energy Feed-in Law in 1990. Many early FiT policies set one rate for all renewable energy technologies, more recently FiT programs are using various rates depending on the type of technology, location, size of the project, and the quality of resources, allowing FiTs to promote multiple renewable energy technologies. Although Germany's FiT program began in 1990, it has been amended and revised in 2000, 2004, 2006, 2008 and 2011. This allows Germany to alter the policies, as the economy and technologies for renewable energy changes. The mechanism provides long-term security to renewable energy producers, typically based on the cost of generation of each technology. For instance, technologies such as wind power, are given a lower per-kWh price, while technologies such as solar PV and tidal power are given a higher price, reflecting its higher costs.

As of July 2014, the feed-in tariffs range from 3.33 ¢/kWh for hydropower facilities over 50 MW to 12.88 ¢/kWh for solar installations on buildings up to 30 kW_{p} and 19 ¢/kWh for offshore wind.

In August 2014, a revised German Renewable Energy Sources Act (EEG) entered into force. From this revised act, specific deployment corridors now stipulate the extent to which renewable energy is to be expanded in the future and the feed-in tariffs gradually will no longer be fixed by the government, rather they will be determined by auction. Wind and solar power will be targeted over hydro, gas, geothermal and biomass.

The goal of the feed-in tariffs is to meet Germany's renewable energy goals of 40 to 45% of electricity consumption by 2025 and 55 to 60% by 2035. The policy also aims to encourage the development of renewable energy technologies, reduce external costs, and increase security of energy supply.

== Future developments ==
=== German Climate Action Plan 2050 ===
The German Climate Action Plan 2050 was approved by the German government on 14 November 2016. It is a climate protection policy document that outlines the measures that Germany will take to meet its national greenhouse gas emissions reduction goals by 2050, as well as service its international commitments under the 2016 Paris Climate Agreement. Projections from the ministry of environment in September 2016 indicate that Germany will likely miss its 2020 climate target.

==== Climate targets ====
On 28 September 2010, Germany announced the following greenhouse gas emissions targets.

Target	2014	2020	2030	2040	2050
Greenhouse gas emissions (base year 1990)	-27%	-40%	-55%	-70%	-80 to -95%

In October 2014, the European Council decided on a target of at least a 40% reduction in domestic greenhouse gas emissions by 2030 relative to 1990 for the EU, this is less stringent than Germany's targets.

==== Sector targets for greenhouse gas emission reductions for 2030 ====
Sector	1990	2014	2030	Reduction (2030 relative 1990)
Energy	466	358	175-183	61-62%
Buildings	209	119	70-72	66-67%
Transport	163	160	95-98	40-42%
Industry	283	181	140-143	49-51%
Agriculture	88	72	58-61	31-34%
Other	39	12	5	87%
Total	1248	902	543-562	55-56%
Units: million tonnes CO_{2}eq

==== Commission for growth, structural change, and regional development ====
The Climate Action Plan 2050 establishes a commission for growth, structural change, and regional development. However, unlike earlier versions of the Germany's climate change plans, the commission will not set a date for an exit from coal. Instead, the commission will develop a mix of instruments that will bring together economic development, structural change, social acceptability and climate protection. The commission will be based at the economics and energy ministry, but will consult with other ministries, federal states, municipalities, and unions, as well as with representatives of companies and regions that may be affected. The commission is scheduled to begin work at the beginning of 2018 and report at the end of 2018.
