= PreussenElektra AG v Schleswag AG =

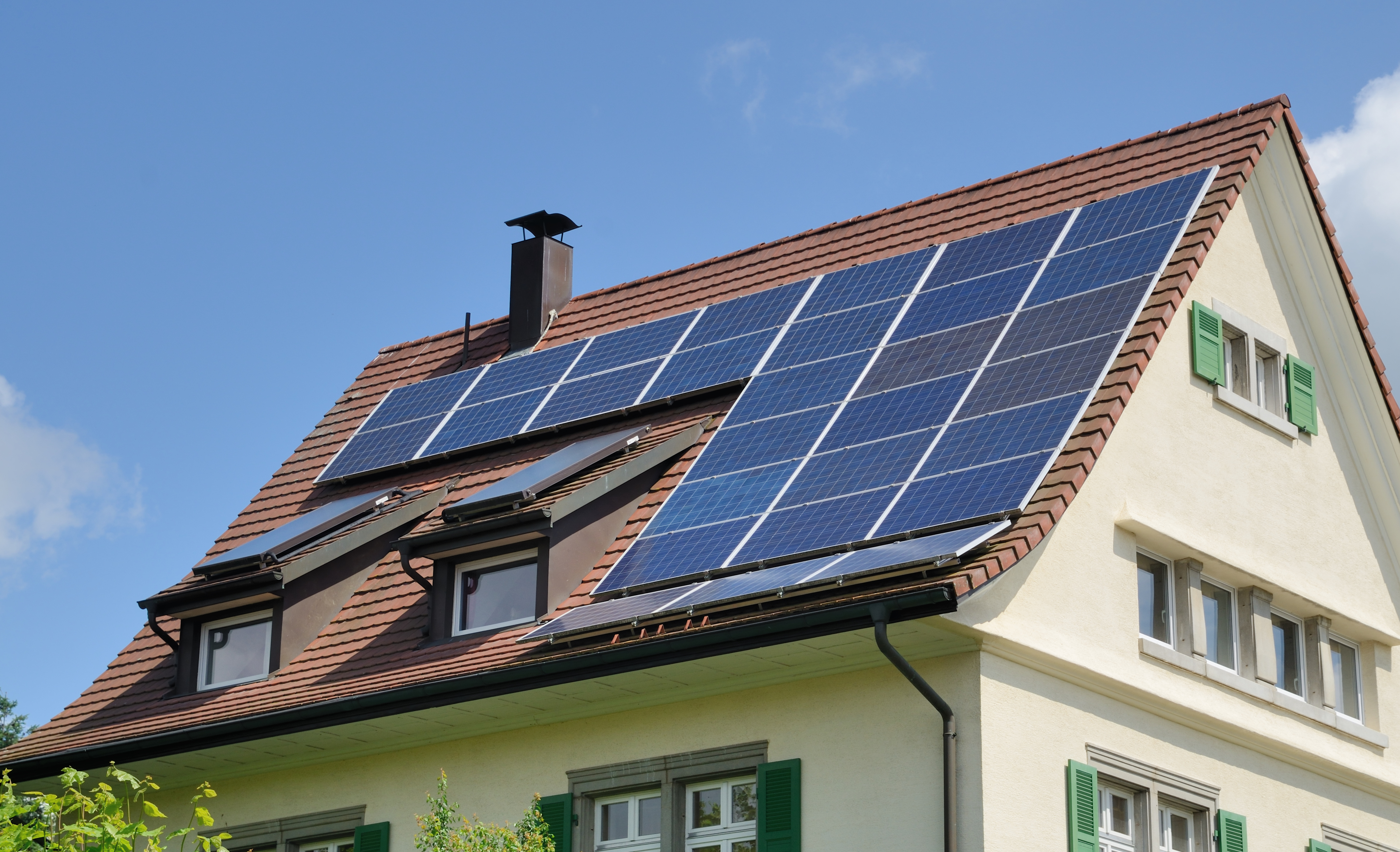
- Solar panels on a German roof
- Court: Court of Justice of the EU
- Citation: (2001) C-379/98

Keywords
- Feed-in tariff, energy, state aid

PreussenElektra AG v Schleswag AG (2001) C-379/98 is a case relating to [EU State aid] in the area of electricity generation.

== Facts ==
The German Electricity Feed-in Act 1998 §§2-3 (Stromeinspeisungsgesetz 1998) required regional electricity distribution companies to buy electricity from renewable energy sources in their area of supply at fixed minimum prices. Upstream energy suppliers were obliged to compensate distribution companies for additional costs. PreussenElektra AG (now part of E.ON), a privately owned upstream supplier, complained that the law was not compatible with the prohibition on state aid, then in TEC article 92(1) (now TFEU article 107(1)) even though it was a requirement of private entities to compensate one another. PreussenElektra and the Commission argued that (1) financial duties on regional distribution companies, like Schleswag, reduced the undertakings’ earnings, and reduced tax receipts for the states (2) the law converted private resources into public ones, with the same effect as a tax, and (3) because 6 of the 9 big upstream suppliers of energy were by majority state-owned, and 60% of shares in regional electricity suppliers were publicly owned, the payments should be considered state aid.

== Judgment ==
=== Advocate General ===
AG Jacobs rejected that the feed-in tariff was state aid.

If the argument of the Commission and PreussenElektra were to be accepted then all sums which one person owes another by virtue of a given law would have to be considered to be State resources. That seems an impossibly wide understanding of the notion.

=== Court of Justice ===
Court of Justice rejected that the feed-in tariff was state aid.

59 In this case, the obligation imposed on private electricity supply undertakings to purchase electricity produced from renewable energy sources at fixed minimum prices does not involve any direct or indirect transfer of State resources to undertakings which produce that type of electricity.

60 Therefore, the allocation of the financial burden arising from that obligation for those private electricity supply undertakings as between them and other private undertakings cannot constitute a direct or indirect transfer of State resources either.

61 In those circumstances, the fact that the purchase obligation is imposed by statute and confers an undeniable advantage on certain undertakings is not capable of conferring upon it the character of State aid within the meaning of Article 92(1) of the Treaty.

62 That conclusion cannot be undermined by the fact, pointed out by the referring court, that the financial burden arising from the obligation to purchase at minimum prices is likely to have negative repercussions on the economic results of the undertakings subject to that obligation and therefore entail a diminution in tax receipts for the State. That consequence is an inherent feature of such a legislative provision and cannot be regarded as constituting a means of granting to producers of electricity from renewable energy sources a particular advantage at the expense of the State (see, to that effect, Sloman Neptun, paragraph 21, and Ecotrade, paragraph 36).

[...]

64 In that respect, it is sufficient to point out that, unlike Article 85 of the Treaty, which concerns only the conduct of undertakings, Article 92 of the Treaty refers directly to measures emanating from the Member States.

== See also ==
- United Kingdom enterprise law
- German Renewable Energy Sources Act
