= Ernsthof Solar Park =

Photovoltaic power station

- Country: Germany
- Location: Wertheim
- Coordinates: 49°42′26.64″N 9°28′28.56″E
- Status: Operational
- Commission date: 2010

Solar farm
- Type: Flat-panel PV
- Site area: 85 ha (210 acres) Site plan

Power generation
- Nameplate capacity: 34.4 MW
- Annual net output: 6.9 GWh

External links
- Website: www.hellenstein-solarwind.de/realisierte-projekte/solarenergie/solarpark-ernsthof.html

Ernsthof Solar Park is a photovoltaic power station near Dörlesberg, Wertheim, Germany. It has a capacity of 34.4 MWp making it the largest Solar Park in the state of Baden-Württemberg. Phase I of 6.88 MWp and covering an area of 16.6 hectares (41 acres), consisted of 31,280 modules by LDK Solar Energy Systems was completed on March 30, 2010. The second phase of 7.25 MWp was completed in December 2010, and it was expanded to 29.5 MW and then to 34.4 MW, with over 120,000 modules being fitted in December. Ernsthof East is 6.8 MW and Ernsthof West is 27.5 MW. The total area is 85 ha (210 acres). Ernsthof is part of the Tauberlandpark, a planned 72 MW solar park consisting of Ernsthof and Solarpark Gickelfeld (28 MW), which has been delayed due to the political uncertainty of solar parks of over 10 MW receiving the FIT. They may need, instead, to sign a Power Purchase Agreement with the grid distribution power company, which is better than subdividing large projects into multiple smaller segments just to qualify for the FIT.

== See also ==
- List of photovoltaic power stations
