= German Renewable Energy Sources Act =

Series of German laws

Renewable Energy Sources Act (2014)
- Long title: Act for the development of renewable energy sources (previously: Act on granting priority to renewable energy sources)
- Commenced: 1 August 2014

Summary
- The 2014 act governs the transition from a feed-in tariff scheme to an auction system for most renewable electricity sources, covering wind power, photovoltaics, biomass (including cogeneration), hydroelectricity, and geothermal energy.

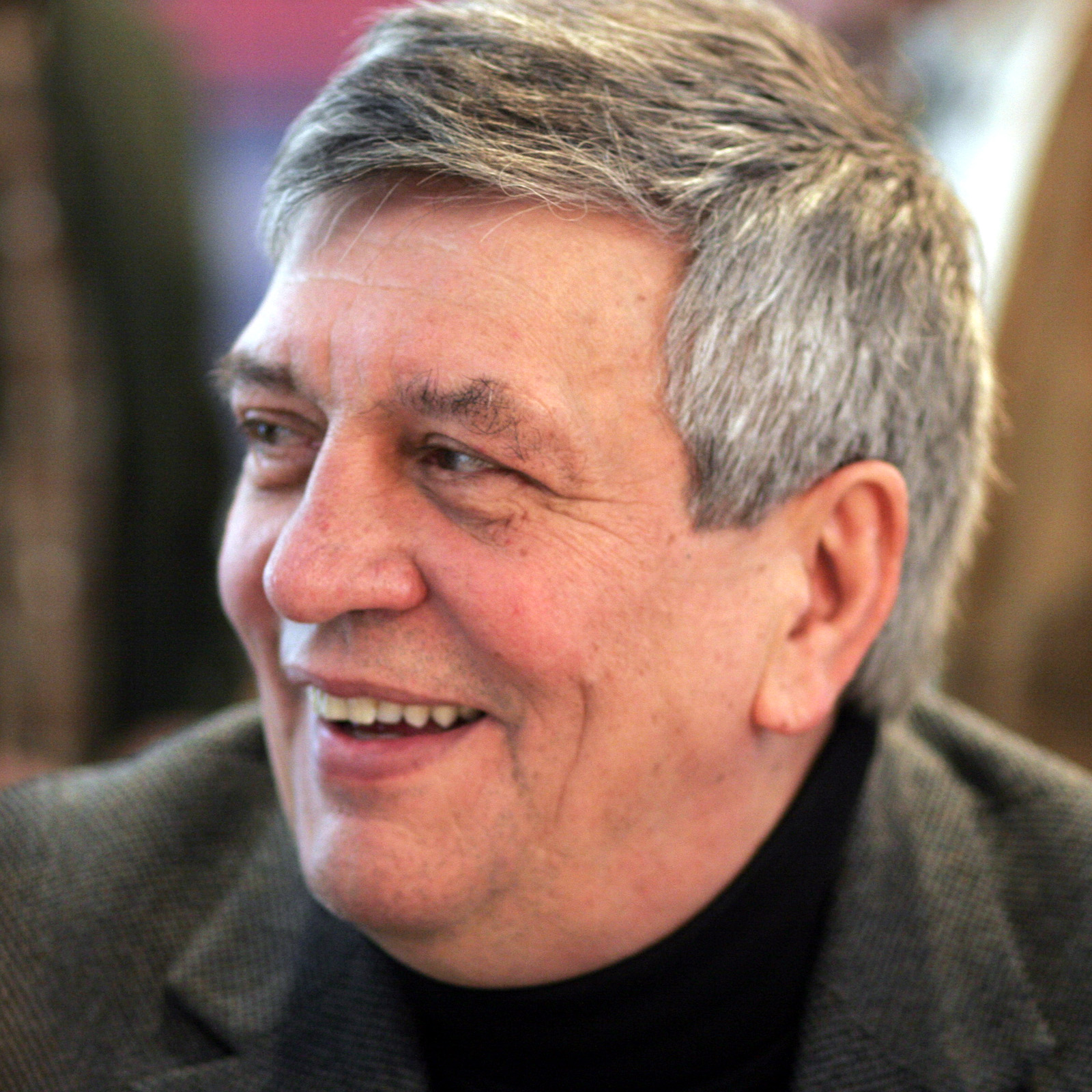
Hermann Scheer (2008), who together with Hans-Josef Fell, helped develop the original EEG legislation in 1999

Logo for renewable energies by Melanie Maecker-Tursun

The Renewable Energy Sources Act (Note: This is the official translation. The act is also referred to as the Renewable Energy Act and the Renewable Energies Act.) or EEG (German: Erneuerbare-Energien-Gesetz) is a series of German laws that originally provided a feed-in tariff (FIT) scheme to encourage the generation of renewable electricity. The EEG 2014 specified the transition to an auction system for most technologies which has been finished with the current version EEG 2017.

The EEG first came into force on 1 April 2000 and has been modified several times since. The original legislation guaranteed a grid connection, preferential dispatch, and a government-set feed-in tariff for 20 years, dependent on the technology and size of project. The scheme was funded by a surcharge on electricity consumers, with electricity-intensive manufacturers and the railways later being required to contribute as little as 0.05 ¢/kWh. For 2017, the unabated EEG surcharge is 6.88 ¢/kWh. In a study in 2011, the average retail price of electricity in Germany, among the highest in the world, stood at around 35 ¢/kWh.

The EEG was preceded by the Electricity Feed-in Act (1991) which entered into force on 1 January 1991. This law initiated the first green electricity feed-in tariff scheme in the world. The original EEG is credited with a rapid uptake of wind power and photovoltaics (PV) and is regarded nationally and internationally as an innovative and successful energy policy measure. The act also covers biomass (including cogeneration), hydroelectricity, and geothermal energy.

A significant revision to the EEG came into effect on 1 August 2014. The prescribed feed-in tariffs should be gone for most technologies in the near future. Specific deployment corridors now stipulate the extent to which renewable electricity is to be expanded in the future and the funding rates are no longer set by the government, but are determined by auction. Plant operators market their production directly and receive a market premium to make up the difference between their bid price and the average monthly spot market price for electricity. The EEG surcharge remains in place to cover this shortfall. This new system was rolled out in stages, starting with ground-mounted photovoltaics in the 2014 law. More legislative revisions for the other branches were introduced with the current EEG on 1 January 2017.

The current EEG has been criticized for setting the deployment corridors (see table) too low to meet Germany's long-term climate protection goals, particularly given the likely electrification of the transport sector. The government target for the share of renewables in power generation is at least 80% by 2050.

The controversial EEG surcharge (or levy) on consumer power bills was removed, effective 1 July 2022. As a result, the average German household is expected to save around €200 per year. Payment obligations will now be met from proceeds from emissions trading and from the federal budget. Guaranteed tariffs for renewables project will continue to be offered going forward.

== Background ==
Development of the EEG surcharge for non-privileged electric energy consumers. Prices are excluding VAT.

The pioneer EEG (spanning 2001–2014) and its predecessor the Electricity Feed-in Act (1991) (spanning 1991–2001) class as feed-in tariff (FIT) schemes, a policy mechanism designed to accelerate the uptake of renewable energy technologies. The scheme offers long-term contracts to renewable energy producers, based on the cost of generation of the particular technology in question. In addition, a grid connection and preferential dispatch are also guaranteed. The tariffs (Einspeisevergütungen) themselves are funded by a levy or surcharge (EEG-Umlage) on electricity consumers, with electricity-intensive manufacturers being largely exempted. The EEG surcharge is based on the difference between the specified feed-in tariffs paid under the EEG and the sale of the renewable energy at the EEX energy exchange by the grid operators (also known as transmission system operators or TSO). As of 2016, the TSOs comprise 50Hertz Transmission, Amprion, Tennet TSO, and TransnetBW.

Amendments to the original EEG added the concept of a market premium in 2012. And the use of deployment corridors and auctions to set the levels of uptake and remuneration, respectively, in 2014.

The EEG has generally been regarded as a success. The EEG (2000) led to the particularly rapid uptake of two renewable energy technologies: wind power and photovoltaics. The high growth of photovoltaics in Germany is set against its relatively poor solar resource. As the US NREL observed:

Countries such as Germany, in particular, have demonstrated that FITs can be used as a powerful policy tool to drive renewable energy deployment and help meet combined energy security and emissions reductions objectives.

— National Renewable Energy Laboratory, 2010

Development of the electricity mix in Germany 1990–2019 showing the growth in renewables

The share of electricity from renewable energy sources has risen dramatically since the introduction of the EEG in 2000. The average annual growth rate is around 9 billion kWh and almost all of this increase is due to electricity generation that qualifies for EEG payments. The EEG is also responsible for 88.3 Mt CO_{2}eq of avoided emissions in 2014, thus making a significant contribution to Germany's climate protection targets. The following table summarizes the remarkable uptake of renewables and in particular photovoltaics:

Electricity generation from renewable energy sources
Year	Hydropower [GWh]	Onshore wind [GWh]	Offshore wind [GWh]	Biomass [GWh]	Photovoltaics [GWh]	Geothermal [GWh]	Total gross electricity generation [GWh]	Share of gross electricity consumption [%]
1990	17,426	71	—	1,435	1	—	18,933	3.4
1995	21,780	1,500	—	2,010	7	—	25,297	4.7
2000	21,732	9,513	—	4,731	60	—	36,036	6.2
2005	19,638	27,229	—	14,354	1,282	0.2	62,503	10.2
2010	20,953	37,619	174	34,307	11,729	28	104,810	17.0
2014	19,590	55,908	1,449	49,219	35,115	98	161,379	27.4

Under the legislation, hydropower includes "wave, tidal, salinity gradient and marine current energy". The use of biomass for electricity generation has also grown as a result of the EEG. Biomass includes: "biogas, biomethane, landfill gas and sewage treatment gas and from the biologically degradable part of waste from households and industry". Mine gas is in a separate category.

Germany's national energy policy is set out in the government's Energy Concept released on 28 September 2010. On 6 June 2011, following Fukushima, the government removed the use of nuclear power as a bridging technology and reintroduced a nuclear phase-out. Boosting renewable electricity generation is an essential part of national policy (see table).

The EEG is also a key element in the implementation of EU Directive 2009/28/EC on the promotion of the use of energy from renewable sources. This directive requires Germany to produce 18% of its gross final energy consumption (including heat and transport) from renewable energy sources by 2020. In this endeavour, the EEG is complemented by the Renewable Energies Heat Act (Erneuerbare-Energien-Wärmegesetz or EEWärmeG). A chart overviewing German energy legislation in 2016 is available.

== Legislation ==
The first discussions on feed-in tariffs in the German parliament began in the 1980s. The Association for the Promotion of Solar Power (SFV), Eurosolar, and the Federal Association of German Hydroelectric Power Plants (BDW) floated early concepts for a FIT scheme. The Economics Ministry and the CDU/CSU and FDP parties opposed non-market measures and argued for voluntary renewables quotas instead. In the late 1980s, CDU/CSU and Green politicians drafted a feed-in tariff bill and sought parliamentary and external support. The newly formed Environment Ministry backed the proposal. The incumbent electricity producers did not devote much effort to counter the bill because they believed its effects would be minimal and their lobby effort was preoccupied with the takeover of the East German electricity system following German reunification in 1989. The bill became the Electricity Feed-in Act (1991).

Prior to the Electricity Feed-in Act, operators of small power plants could only obtain access to the grid at the behest of the grid owners and were sometimes refused entirely. Remuneration was based on the averted costs faced by the energy utilities, yielding low rates and unattractive investment conditions. Government support for renewable electricity before the act was primarily through R&D programs administered by the Federal Ministry for Research and Technology (BMFT).

=== Electricity Feed-in Act (1991) ===
Germany first began promoting renewable electricity using feed-in tariffs with the Electricity Feed-in Act (Stromeinspeisungsgesetz or StrEG). The long title is the law on feeding electricity from renewable energy sources into the public grid. The law entered into force on 1 January 1991. This legislation was the first green electricity feed-in tariff scheme in the world. The law obliged grid companies to connect all renewable power plants, to grant them priority dispatch, and pay them a guaranteed feed-in tariff over 20 years.

While the Electricity Feed-in Act did much to promote wind power, the installed capacity of photovoltaic installations remained low (see table). The remuneration for photovoltaics was simply too little in most settings. Low-interest loans were then offered under additional government programs.

Beginning in 1998, the Electricity Feed-in Act was challenged under European Union anti-subsidy rules by PreussenElektra (an E.ON predecessor). The European Court of Justice (ECJ) found that the arrangements did not constitute state aid. The court concluded:

Statutory provisions of a Member State which, first, require private electricity supply undertakings to purchase electricity produced in their area of supply from renewable energy sources at minimum prices higher than the real economic value of that type of electricity, and, second, distribute the financial burden resulting from that obligation between those electricity supply undertakings and upstream private electricity network operators do not constitute State aid within the meaning of Article 92(1) of the EC Treaty.

— European Court of Justice, Luxembourg, 13 March 2001

The Electricity Feed-in Act suffered from structural flaws. First, the coupling of feed-in tariffs to the electricity price proved too volatile to ensure investment security. Second, the distribution of burdens was uneven, with grid operators in high-wind regions having to pay out more. In light of this latter concern, the act was amended in 1998 to introduce, among other things, a double 5% cap on feed-in purchases. This ceiling slowed uptake in some regions.

The Electricity Feed-in Act was enacted by a CDU/CSU/FDP coalition government.

=== Renewable Energy Sources Act (2000) ===
The Electricity Feed-in Act was replaced by the Renewable Energy Sources Act (2000), also known as the EEG (2000), and came into force on 1 April 2000. The legislation is available in English. The long title is an act on granting priority to renewable energy sources. The three principles of the act are:

- Investment protection through guaranteed feed-in tariffs and connection requirement. Every kilowatt-hour generated from a renewable electricity facility receives a confirmed technology-specific feed-in tariff for 20 years. Grid operators are required to preferentially dispatch this electricity over electricity from conventional sources like nuclear power, coal, and gas. As a result, small and medium enterprises were given new access to the electricity system, along with energy cooperatives (Genossenschaft), farmers, and households.
- No charge to German public finances. The remuneration payments are not considered public subsidies since they are not derived from taxation but rather through an EEG surcharge on electricity consumers. In 2015, the aggregate EEG surcharge totalled €21.8 billion and the EEG surcharge itself was 6.17 ¢/kWh. The EEG surcharge can be substantially reduced for electricity-intensive industries under the 'special equalization scheme' (Besonderen Ausgleichsregelung) (introduced in a 2003 amendment).
- Innovation by decreasing feed-in-tariffs. The feed-in tariffs decrease at regular intervals to exert a downwards cost pressure on plant operators and technology manufacturers. This decrease, known as a 'degression', applies to new installations. It is expected that technologies become more cost efficient with time and the legislation captures this view:

The compensation rates ... have been determined by means of scientific studies, subject to the provision that the rates identified should make it possible for an installation – when managed efficiently – to be operated cost-effectively, based on the use of state-of-the-art technology and depending on the renewable energy sources naturally available in a given geographical environment.

— Renewable Energy Sources Act (2000)

Unlike the preceding Electricity Feed-in Act, feed-in tariffs were now specified in absolute terms and no longer tied to the prevailing electricity price. The tariffs also differentiated between scale (larger plants received less) and electricity yield (wind turbines in low-wind areas received more). The new tariffs were based on cost-recovery plus profit and increased substantially. For instance, photovoltaic remuneration rose from 8.5 ¢/kWh to a maximum of 51 ¢/kWh. Offshore wind, geothermal energy, and mine gas were included for the first time. The concept of an annual reduction or 'degression' was introduced, with annual degression rates varying between 1% for biomass and 5% for photovoltaics. Photovoltaics installations were capped at 350 MW_{p} (Note: MW_{p} refers to peak megawatts, the output from a photovoltaic installation under standard test conditions. See nominal power (photovoltaic).) to control costs (later raised to 1000 MW_{p} in 2002 and removed in 2004).

The new act introduced a nationwide compensation scheme with the aim of spreading the remuneration burden on grid operators across all electricity utilities. This included a new EEG surcharge (EEG-Umlage) to fund the feed-in remunerations. The previous double-5% cap was duly removed.

The new act also introduced the 100,000 roofs program (100.000-Dächer-Programm). This ran until 2003 and offered low-interest loans for photovoltaic installations below 300 MW_{p}. It proved highly successful in combination with the FIT scheme and led to a rapid increase in photovoltaic capacity.

The first EEG amendment, effective from 16 July 2003, introduced the 'special equalisation scheme' (Besondere Ausgleichsregelung), designed to unburden electricity-intensive industries from the rising EEG surcharge. To be eligible, companies had to fulfil the following criteria: electricity consumption of more than 100 GWh/a, electricity expenses of more than 20% of gross value added, and a considerable impairment of competitiveness. Exempted firms pay only 0.05 ¢/kWh. As a result, non-privileged consumers faced a higher EEG surcharge. Arbitration on eligibility was by the Federal Office of Economics and Export Control (Bundesamt für Wirtschaft und Ausfuhrkontrolle).

The EEG was built on experience gained under the Electricity Feed-in Act. Without the prior act, the EEG would not have been as sophisticated or as far reaching. Notwithstanding, the Economics Ministry remained hostile to the concept of feed-in tariffs and refused to help with legal drafting.

An SPD/Greens coalition government, elected in 1998, paved the way for the reform of the Electricity Feed-in Act to give the EEG (2000).

=== PV Interim Act (2003) ===
The PV Interim Act (2003) raised photovoltaic tariffs from 1 January 2004 and in particular for small rooftop installations, to compensate for the ending of low-interest loans under the expiring 100,000 roofs program. The limit on free-standing photovoltaic systems exceeding 100 kW_{p} and the 1000 MW_{p} cap on photovoltaic installations in total were both removed.

=== Renewable Energy Sources Act (2004) ===
An amended version of the EEG came into force on 1 August 2004. While the basic framework remained unchanged, this act introduced a substantially modified and differentiated tariff structure, to better match the economic viabilities of the technologies concerned. Tariffs for biomass, photovoltaics, and geothermal energy were increased. Detailed measures were introduced to deal with market complexities, windfall profits, and the incentives for innovation and cost reduction. Eligible projects may no longer degrade ecologically sensitive areas. Exemptions for industry from the EEG surcharge under the special equalization scheme were extended considerably. The minimum electricity consumption requirement was reduced to 10 GWh/a, the share of electricity costs relative to gross value added was reduced to 15%, and the impairment of competitiveness criteria was removed altogether. Railways were now automatically exempt, being regarded as an environmentally friendly form of transport.

Renewable targets were now defined in the act for the first time: 12.5% for the share of renewable energy in gross final electricity consumption by 2010 and at least 20% by 2020.

Thus the EEG (2004) resulted in significantly better conditions for photovoltaics, biomass (including small farm systems and new technologies), offshore wind, and geothermal energy, while onshore wind and small hydroelectric plant largely retained their former standing. The new special equalization scheme lead to wider benefits for industry. Only about 40 companies complied under the previous rules, mostly from the chemical, steel, and metals industries. That number climbed to between 120 and 350 with the new rules.

The European Union Emission Trading Scheme (EU ETS) entered into effect on 1 January 2005. Many industry lobbyists argued that the emissions trading transcended the need for a renewable electricity feed-in tariff scheme and that the EEG should therefore be scrapped. In December 2005 the European Commission released a report preferring feed-in tariffs for national renewable electricity support.

The 2004 legislation was overseen by an SPD/Greens coalition government.

=== Renewable Energy Sources Act (2009) ===
The 2009 amendments were undertaken alongside a boom in renewable electricity uptake. In 2009, renewables accounted for 16.3% of total electricity generation, up from 9.3% in 2004. Over the same period, the EEG surcharge climbed from 0.54 ¢/kWh to 1.32 ¢/kWh. For further context, the European Union climate and energy package, approved on 17 December 2008, contained a year 2020 national target for Germany of 18% renewable energy in its total energy consumption.

The 2009 amendments yielded improvements for the entire range of renewables, increased the renewables target considerably, introduced new sustainability criteria for bioenergy, and extended industry privileges. Flexible degression rates were also introduced, which can now be adjusted without reference to the Bundestag. The legislation came into force on 1 January 2009.

More specifically, the photovoltaic tariffs were reduced somewhat, but not enough to affect uptake. The degression for PV was tightened from 5% to 8–10%, depending on the size of installation. A new 'self-consumption incentive' granted a fixed tariff of 25.01 ¢/kWh for electricity consumed by a PV operator within their own house. A 'flexible degression cap' was introduced, under which the degression rate could be adjusted to keep the uptake of photovoltaics within a specified corridor. The support for onshore wind improved. The initial tariff was raised, the repowering (when old turbines are replaced by new) bonus (Repoweringbonus) was increased, and an additional system service bonus was granted for specified technical contributions (Systemdienstleistungen or SDL), including the ability to maintain voltage if the transmission grid fails. The tariff for offshore wind was raised substantially. An additional 'early starter bonus' was offered for offshore wind farms entering operation before 2015. In parallel to the EEG, a separate loan program of €5 billion was established, to be administered by the state-owned KfW bank, with the goal of reaching 25 GW installed capacity for wind by 2030. Support of biomass was also increased, with special bonuses for a number of different biomass types. Biomass must also comply with specified ecological requirements to be eligible, these requirements being contained in a separate 'sustainability ordinance' (Nachhaltigkeitsverordnung or BioSt-NachV). The hydroelectricity tariffs were raised considerably and particularly for micro and small power plants. The tariffs for geothermal energy were raised considerably too, as was the cogeneration bonus. An additional 'early starter bonus' was introduced for geothermal projects put into operation before 2016. A 'green power privilege' (Grünstromprivileg) was introduced, which exempted electricity suppliers with a minimum quota of renewables from the EEG surcharge under certain circumstances. New measures allowed grid operators to temporarily limit wind turbine output in times of network congestion, with compensation payable to the plant owner for lost remuneration.

The renewable targets in the new law were increased to at least 35% (previously 20%) of total electricity production by 2020, 50% by 2030, 65% by 2040, and 80% by 2050.

The 2009 legislation was overseen by a CDU/CSU/SPD grand coalition government.

The government launched its national Energy Concept in September 2010. This represents a significant milestone in the development of energy policy in Germany. On 6 June 2011, following Fukushima, the government removed the use of nuclear power as a bridging technology as part of their policy.

=== PV Act (2010) ===
It was becoming clear that action on the photovoltaic remuneration was necessary. The growth in photovoltaics had exceeded all expectations. In 2009 alone, 10600 MW_{p} of capacity was installed. As a result, the support costs had skyrocketed.

The government responded with the PV Act (2010) which entered into force retrospectively with effect from 1 July 2010. The legislation introduced a dramatic reduction in photovoltaic tariffs, cutting these between 8 and 13% depending on the installation type, followed by a second cut of 3%. The deployment corridor was doubled to between 2500 and 3500 MW_{p}, along with tighter growth-dependent degression rates of 1–12%, in addition to the ordinary degression of 9%. The self-consumption incentive was significantly raised to around 8 ¢/kWh and eligibility extended to systems up to 500 kW_{p}. The feed-in rate itself was dependent on the system size and the proportion of demand that was consumed on-site. Free-standing systems were excluded from using agricultural land.

=== PV Interim Act (2011) ===
The PV Interim Act (2011) introduced the possibility of further downward adjustments for the photovoltaic tariffs during the year. If the installed capacity during the first months of the year exceeded the equivalent of 3,500 MW_{p} per year, feed-in tariffs would be lowered by 1 July 2011 for rooftop systems and 1 September 2011 for free-standing systems. It also modified the flexible cap to better control the growth of photovoltaics.

In application of the EEG (2009) version in force at the time, no further adjustment to the feed-in tariffs occurred in 2011. This is explained because the installed capacity between 28 February 2011 and 1 June 2011 was less than 875 MW_{p} (which multiplied by 4, is below the 3,500 MWp threshold).

=== Renewable Energy Sources Act (2012) ===
The act was again modified and came into force on 1 January 2012. The new EEG sought to advance the dynamic expansion of renewable electricity generation, control the rising costs associated with the scheme, and enhance market and grid integration, while adhering to the principles of a feed-in system. The revised system includes a market premium scheme, the market premium was intended to prepare renewables for the market and to eventually lower their dependence on explicit policy measures.

The rising shares of variable renewable generation had led to concerns about the ability of the electricity system to cope. The new act included measures for the grid integration of photovoltaic systems. Grid operators could now limit the feed-in of photovoltaics in times of grid overload, with the plant operators receiving compensation for their loss of revenue. A new ordinance required the retrofitting of photovoltaic systems to avoid the 50.2 Hz problem – the risk of widespread blackouts as PV systems simultaneously tripped in the face of frequencies above 50.2 Hz. Free-standing photovoltaic systems on nature conservation areas were excluded from remuneration. The tariff structure for onshore wind was basically maintained, but the degression was tightened from 1% to 1.5% to incentivize efficiency improvements. The system services bonus for onshore wind was extended and the repowering bonus was improved. Offshore wind gained through improved early starter provisions. The start of the degression was postponed until 2018, but increased from 5% to 7%. Starter tariffs were increased but now last 8 rather than 12 years. Biomass tariffs were lowered by 10–15% on average, particularly for small systems. The biomass tariff system itself was greatly simplified, with now four size categories and two fuel categories. The degression for biomass was increased from 1% to 2%. The tariffs for hydroelectricity were simplified, the funding period now uniformly 20 years, and the degression rate set at 1%. The tariffs for geothermal energy were raised and the start of the degression postponed until 2018, albeit at an increased rate. Electricity storage facilities were fully exempted from grid charges and are to be supported by a special research program.

Industry privileges under the special equalisation scheme were extended to include more companies and the tariff reductions further improved. The eligibility requirements were lowered from 10 GWh/a to 1 GWh/a and the electricity expenses threshold in terms of gross value added lowered from 15% to 14%. As a result, the number of exempt firms rose from 734 in 2012 to about 2057 in 2013. The exempted electricity load rose from 84.7 TWh to 97 TWh, a relatively modest increase due to the smaller sizes of the newly exempted firms.

Industrial self-consumption, previously exempted from the EEG surcharge, was now subject to the surcharge if the public grid was used, except in special circumstances. This measure was aimed at preventing abuse through contracting.

The introduction of an optional market premium was designed to support demand-oriented electricity generation. The market premium is the difference between the EEG tariff and the average spot market price. An additional management premium reimbursed administration costs and mitigated against market risks. For large biogas plants over 750 kW, the use of direct marketing was made compulsory from 2014 onwards. An additional flexibility premium was introduced for gas storage at biogas facilities. The details of the market premium were to be provided in a following governmental directive, following parliamentary approval.

The green power privilege was also modified. Energy suppliers whose portfolio comprised more than 50% EEG-funded renewables had their surcharge reduced by 2 ¢/kWh, previously they had been fully exempt. In addition, a minimum share of 20% of fluctuating sources, namely wind and PV, was required.

The renewables targets remained unchanged and are identical to those specified in the 2010 Energy Concept.

In 2013, after numerous complaints, the European Commission opened an in-depth state aid investigation into the EEG surcharge exemptions for energy-intensive companies and into the green power privilege. The commission nonetheless accepted that the underlying feed-in tariff and market premium schemes were compliment. On 10 May 2016 the EU General Court sided with the commission and determined that the EEG (2012) involved state aid as indicated. (The next EEG (2014) was specifically designed to resolve these difficulties.)

The 2012 legislation was overseen by a CDU/CSU/FDP coalition government.

=== PV Act (2013) ===
Despite the cutbacks in photovoltaic support, photovoltaic installations continued to boom. In December 2011 alone, 3000 MW_{p} were added in an effort to beat the tariff reductions beginning in 2012. Moreover, the EEG surcharge had grown to 3.53 ¢/kWh for 2011, with the largest component being photovoltaic remuneration. The EEG surcharge was projected to grow considerably, despite the falling tariff structure. For the first time, cost control became the "determining factor" in the political debate over the EEG.

This was despite the fact that the merit order effect had been depressing electricity spot prices. The merit order effect occurs when preferentially dispatched wind and photovoltaic generation displaces more expensive fossil fuel generation from the margin – often gas-fired combined cycle plant – thereby driving down the cleared price. This effect is more pronounced for photovoltaics because their midday peak correlates with the maximum generation requirement on the system. The merit order effect also lowers the revenues for conventional power plants and makes them less economically viable. A 2007 study finds that "in the case of the year 2006, the volume of the merit order effect exceeds the volume of the net support payments for renewable electricity generation which have to be paid by consumers". A 2013 study estimates the merit order effect of both wind and photovoltaic electricity generation for the years 2008–2012: the combined merit order effect of wind and photovoltaics ranges from 0.5 ¢/kWh in 2010 to more than 1.1 ¢/kWh in 2012.

The PV Act (2013) came into force retrospectively on 1 April 2012. The tariff cuts were up to 30%, with the tariff cuts scheduled in the EEG (2012) for 1 July 2012 advanced and tightened from their original 15%. The system size categories were changed, now up to 10, 40, 1000, and 10000 kW_{p}. A new category of 10–40 kW_{p} was introduced, while free-standing systems were limited to 10 MW_{p}. The regular standard degression was set to 1% per month, equal to 11.4% per year, and replacing the previous six-monthly adjustment. The flexible cap for the deployment corridor remained unchanged at 2500 to 3500 MW_{p} per year. If new additions exceed this corridor, the degression rises by 1.0% up to 2.8%. A hard cap on the total photovoltaic capacity was introduced, set at 52 GW_{p}. The self-consumption privilege was removed for new installations, as grid parity was already met: the feed-in tariff for roof systems at 19.5 ¢/kWh was now lower than the average electricity price for households at 23 ¢/kWh. Changes to the market integration model reduced the eligibility for remuneration of systems between 10 and 1000 kW_{p} to 90% of their electricity production from 2014 onwards. The residual electricity could either be self-consumed or sold on the electricity market.

=== Renewable Energy Sources Act (2014) ===
The EEG (2014) is sometimes known as the EEG 2.0 due to its marked departure from earlier legislation. This revision took effect from 1 August 2014. The act is available in English. The act requires operators of new plant to market their electricity themselves. In turn they receive a market premium from the grid operator to compensate for the difference between the fixed EEG payment and the average spot price for electricity. The act also paved the way for a switch from specified feed-in tariffs to a system of tendering.

==== Purpose and aim ====
The purpose of the EEG (2014) is stated in the legislation:

The purpose of this Act is to enable the energy supply to develop in a sustainable manner in particular in the interest of mitigating climate change and protecting the environment, to reduce the costs to the economy not least by including long-term external effects, to conserve fossil energy resources and to promote the further development of technologies to generate electricity from renewable energy sources.

— § 1(1) Renewable Energy Sources Act (2014)

The EEG (2014) also contains statutory targets for the share of renewable energy in gross final electricity consumption (the targets are additional to those set out in the government's 2010 Energy Concept statement):

EEG (2014) targets
Year	Share of renewable energy in gross final electricity consumption
2025	40–45%
2035	55–60%
2050	>80%

==== Deployment corridors ====
The EEG (2014) specifies binding trajectories for the following individual technologies:

EEG (2014) technology-specific deployment corridors
Renewable energy technology	New capacity/year
Solar energy	2.5 GW_{p} (gross)
Onshore wind energy	2.5 GW (net)
Biomass	approx 100 MW (gross)
Renewable energy technology	Installed capacity
Offshore wind energy	by 2020: 6.5 GW
Offshore wind energy	by 2030: 15 GW

==== Details ====
The level of remuneration is still prescribed under the EEG until 2017. However the way that new installations receive their remuneration has changed. Most plant operators must now directly market their output, for which they get an additional market premium payment instead of an explicit feed-in tariff. This premium is the difference between the average monthly wholesale price at the EEX energy exchange and the fixed remuneration stated in the EEG. Installations under 100 kW are exempt from these provisions and existing installations will continue to operate under the rules under which they were established. From 2014 to 2017 onwards, defined remuneration rates will be replaced by competitive bidding, also known as auctions or tenders. Those investors offering the lowest prices will then receive support. The new act does not specify the auction model in detail, but potential designs were piloted in 2015 using ground-mounted photovoltaic systems.

The flexible cap mechanism for expansion corridors was replaced with set annual targets for the addition of wind, photovoltaic, and biogas capacity. The government hopes these new corridors will lead to a better coordination between renewables and the use and expansion of the transmission network, as well as improving planning security for conventional generators.

The target corridor for photovoltaics is set at 2.4 to 2.6 GW_{p} per year and the hard cap of 52 GW_{p} (introduced in 2013) remains in place. Photovoltaic installations beyond this upper bound will not receive funding under the EEG. The remuneration for photovolatic installations is reduced 0.50 percent every month, unless the installed capacity in the preceding months is below or above the installed capacity target. The degression rate can increase or decrease according to the deviation from the 2,500 MW_{p} goal during the twelve months prior to the beginning of each quarter. The corresponding degression rate is then used during the three months of the quarter, in the following way:

- If installed capacity exceeds the target by more than 4,900 MW_{p}, feed-in tariff decreases 2.80 percent
  - by more than 3,900 MW_{p}, 2.50 percent,
  - by more than 2,900 MW_{p}, 2.20 percent,
  - by more than 1,900 MW_{p,} 1.80 percent,
  - by more than 900 MW_{p}, 1.40 percent,
  - by up to 900 MW_{p}, 1.00 percent.
- If installed capacity falls between 2,400 and 2,600 MW_{p}, the feed-in tariff decreases 0.50 percent.
- If installed capacity is below the target by less than 900 MW_{p}, feed-in tariff decreases 0.25 percent
  - by more than 900 MW_{p,} the feed-in tariff remains the same,
  - by more than 1,400 MW_{p}, to zero; the feed-in tariff may rise on a one-off basis by 1.50 percent on the first calendar day of the respective quarter.

Onshore wind retained its annual target of 2.4 to 2.6 GW. However the target now excludes repowering, effectively extending the growth cap. The management premium and the bonus paid to wind farms providing stabilizing features (Systemdienstleistungen) are now being phased out. From 2016 onwards, the onshore wind tariff is reduced quarterly, depending on whether new capacity tracks the prescribed target. For offshore wind, the new act defines a target of 6.5 GW by 2020 and 15 GW by 2030. Offshore wind farms that entered service before 2020 can choose between a fixed payment for 8 years or a reduced payment for 12 years. After this period, the basic reward is reduced still further, depending on the distance from shore and the depth of the sea. The biomass target is set at 0.1 GW per year. Only biogas plants that use biowaste and liquid manure will receive more than the standard remuneration, depending on their capacity. Tariffs are to be reduced by 0.5% on a three-monthly basis for new installations.

On 16 April 2014 the European Commission found that EEG (2014) support for 20 offshore wind farms totalling almost 7 GW was not state aid. On 23 July 2014 the European Commission approved the EEG (2014), having assessed it to be in line with EU rules on state aid. Indeed, the EEG (2014) was the first revision of the Renewable Energy Sources Act to be "materially shaped by the commission's view on state aid".

In July 2015 the Economics and Energy Ministry (BMWi) released a design document covering renewables auctions. In early 2016 the BMWi reported that the ground-mounted photovoltaics tender pilot, comprising three auction in 2015, was successful. The BMWi also stated that the competition was high and that prices fell from round to round. It added that small bidders were able to win tenders. These results will be used to develop auctions for other renewable electricity generation technologies.

The sixth and last round of PV auctions under this particular legislation produced 27 successful bids totaling 163 MW. The average successful price was 6.9 ¢/kWh and the lowest awarded price was 6.26 ¢/kWh. These figures confirm a falling trend from auction to auction.

The 2014 legislation was overseen by a CDU/CSU/SPD grand coalition government.

=== Renewable Energy Sources Act (2017) ===
The government began again to update of the EEG, first dubbed the EEG (2016), now the EEG (2017). The revised act is slated to take effect from 1 January 2017.

The following explains some of the process prior to the final legislation. On 8 December 2015 the government released its proposals for reform. On 8 June 2016 the Federal Cabinet (Bundeskabinett) cleared the draft EEG (2016) bill. That bill will now go to the Bundestag and Bundesrat for consideration.

The reform is being driven by three guiding principles, namely the need:

- "to keep within agreed deployment corridors for the development of renewable energy"
- "to keep to a minimum the overall cost arising from the Renewable Energy Sources Act"
- "to use auctions to create a level playing field for all of the players involved"

The government believes that the new auction system will control costs. The new system also accords with the desire of the European Commission for renewables support to be market-based. With regard to wind energy, the new rules are intended to encourage installations in sites with strong winds and across Germany. To this end, a suite of complex calculations (Referenzertragsmodell) are being developed to ensure that bids are comparable and payments are fair. Thus, the switch to auction-based remuneration rates responds to criticism by economists that fixed feed-in tariffs might be too expensive (when set too high) or stimulate too few installations (when set too low) rather than reacting to market conditions where costs quickly evolve.

The proposed EEG (2016) is a continuation of the EEG (2014). It replaces prescribed feed-in tariffs with an auction system for the majority of renewable technologies. It repeats the deployment corridors specified in the EEG (2014) to control the uptake of renewable electricity over the next decade and to ensure that future renewable energy targets are honored. This corridor will be maintained by auctioning only a defined capacity each year. Only those renewables projects that bid successfully will receive EEG support for the electricity they supply over the following 20 years. Each technology – photovoltaics, onshore wind, offshore wind, and biomass – will get an auction design tailored to its needs. Small renewables installations of under 750 kW capacity or under 150 kW for biomass will not be required to tender and will continue to receive conventional feed-in tariffs. Bidders from other European countries will be able to compete in the auctions for up to 5% of the annual capacity, under certain conditions. The new auction system should cover more than 80% of the new renewable electricity capacity.

As indicated above, the auction system was piloted in 2015 for ground-mounted photovoltaic facilities. As a result of this trial, the Economics and Energy Ministry (BMWi) abandoned 'uniform pricing' in favor of 'pay-as-bid'. The Federal Network Agency (Bundesnetzagentur) will call for tenders for renewable projects and set the capacity to correspond to the trajectory needed for a 40–45% share in 2025. Starting in 2017, there will be between three and four auctions per year for photovoltaics and onshore wind. Participants will submit single sealed bids and will have to provide a substantial security deposit to ensure good faith. Bids are tied to projects and locations and cannot normally be transferred. The lowest bids will win until the capacity under auction is met. A ceiling price is to be notified in advance. Successful projects will receive the funding rate with which they won for a period of 20 years. Special rules apply for citizen energy projects: small projects are exempt from the auction system altogether and larger projects will receive the highest offer accepted in their round rather than their own possibly lower bid.

Onshore wind investors will also have to get prior approval for their projects under the Federal Immission Control Act (Bundes-Immissionsschutzgesetzes or BlmSchG), the federal law regulating the harmful effects of air pollution, noise, vibration and similar phenomena. Citizens cooperatives (Genossenschaft) participating in wind energy tenders have special dispensations. Wind energy auctions will be held more often in the beginning, with three in 2017 and four in 2018, in order to quickly establish a price level. The annual capacity for onshore wind farms will be set at 2.8 GW per year for 2017 to 2019 and at 2.9 GW thereafter. In order to better synchronise the development of the grid with renewables growth, the addition of onshore wind will be restricted to specified 'grid congestion zones' where high inputs of renewable electricity cannot be accepted because of network congestion. These areas are to be identified by the Federal Network Agency. The new rules on funding offshore wind farms will apply to those projects that commence operation in 2021 or later. From 2025, the government will specify the sites for future wind farms and investors will then compete for the right to build at those locations. This centralised (Danish) model is designed to ensure competition and to make project approvals, site planning, and network connections more cost effective and better integrated. Between 2021 and 2024 a transitional auction model will be used and wind farms that have been planned and approved but not built will compete in two rounds of tenders for a restricted amount of capacity. Offshore wind will remain capped at 15 GW by 2030 and the capacity auctioned each year will be consistent with this target. In 2021, only wind farms in the Baltic Sea will be considered, due to a shortage of network connections at the North Sea. Biomass projects will also participate in the new auction system. Biomass capacity is to be expanded by 150 MW annually in the next three years and by 200 MW annually for the following three years. Installations with a capacity greater than 150 kW will also be able to tender. Biomass facilities will only receive remuneration for half their runtime in order to incentivize their use during times of high electricity prices. Hydroelectricity, geothermal, and mine, landfill, and sewage gas are excluded from the auction system because of the prospect of insufficient competition.

On 20 December 2016, the European Commission found that the EEG amendments are in line with EU rules governing state aid, thereby allowing the planned introduction on 1 January 2017 to be honored.

This round of legislation is being overseen by a CDU/CSU/SPD grand coalition government.

==== Reactions ====
In January 2016, in response to the official proposals, Greenpeace Germany cautioned that a complete overhaul of the successful EEG would endanger climate protection targets. The German Wind Energy Association (BWE) and others are calling for a 2.5 GW net capacity addition for onshore wind energy per annum that is not dependent on the increase of offshore wind. They also say that the 40–45% renewables target by 2025 should not be treated as a fixed ceiling. The German Engineering Federation (VDMA) said that "the EEG amendment gives rise to growing uncertainty in the industry" and that "it is however not right to regulate the expansion of renewable energy production by controlling the tendering volume for onshore wind energy and inflexibly clinging on to a 45% target in the electricity sector".

Estimates for 2012 suggest that almost half the renewable energy capacity in Germany is owned by citizens through energy cooperatives (Genossenschaft) and private installations. Critics worry that the new rules will preclude citizen participation, despite the special provisions for cooperatives and individuals. Preparing tenders is expensive (costing perhaps €50,000–100,000) and that expenditure is sunk if the bid fails. In January 2016 Greenpeace Energy said that renewables auctions would make the Energiewende less fair and that citizen cooperatives and small investors would be at a disadvantage. Germanwatch, WWF-Germany, and Deutsche Umwelthilfe (DUH), three German NGOs, said the proposed reforms do not properly account for small, citizen-owned renewables projects. Citizen participation is seen as a key reason for the widespread public acceptance of renewable technologies in Germany. That support may lag if the EEG reforms favor large companies over cooperatives and individuals.

==== Political positions ahead of 2017 elections ====
In November 2016, the CDU revealed that it is considering scrapping the EEG, although it remains undecided as to whether it will make this an election issue for 2017.

=== 2019 European Court of Justice state aid ruling ===
In March 2019, the European Court of Justice ruled that feed‑in tariffs do not class as state aid, admissible or otherwise. This landmark decision annuls an earlier commission decision that the German renewable energy law of 2012 involved state aid. More specifically, the ECJ found that the commission had failed to establish that the advantages provided by feed‑in tariffs involved state resources and therefore constituted state aid.

== Feed-in tariffs ==
The structure and development of feed-in tariffs over the course of the EEG is a complex topic. This section is simply intended to give an indication. The feed-in tariffs for all technologies applicable as of 1 August 2014 are listed here. The following table summarizes onshore wind energy remunerations from April 2000 to October 2016.

Onshore wind energy remuneration [¢/kWh]
Phase	Initial	Basic
EEG (2000)	9.1	6.19
EEG (2004)	8.7	5.5
EEG (2009)	9.2	5.02
EEG (2012)	8.93	4.87
EEG (2014) from 1 August 2014	8.9	4.95
EEG (2014) from 1 January 2016	8.79	4.89
EEG (2014) from 1 April 2016	8.69	4.83
EEG (2014) from 1 June 2016	8.58	4.77
EEG (2014) from 1 October 2016	8.48	4.72
Source for EEG (2014) figures

The table below summarizes photovoltaics remunerations from August 2004 to January 2012. As of 2016, under the EEG mandate, the Federal Network Agency (Bundesnetzagentur) publishes the currently installed PV capacity with adjusted feed-in tariffs monthly as a downloadable spreadsheet. Otherwise, for data beyond January 2012, please see: feed-in tariffs in Germany.

Photovoltaic remuneration [¢/kWh]
Type		2004	2005	2006	2007	2008	2009	2010	July 2010	October 2010	2011	January 2012
Rooftop-mounted	up to 30 kW_{p}	57.40	54.53	51.80	49.21	46.75	43.01	39.14	34.05	33.03	28.74	24.43
Rooftop-mounted	above 30 kW_{p}	54.60	51.87	49.28	46.82	44.48	40.91	37.23	32.39	31.42	27.33	23.23
Rooftop-mounted	above 100 kW_{p}	54.00	51.30	48.74	46.30	43.99	39.58	35.23	30.65	29.73	25.86	21.98
Rooftop-mounted	above 1000 kW_{p}	54.00	51.30	48.74	46.30	43.99	33.00	29.37	25.55	24.79	21.56	18.33
Ground-mounted	conversion areas	45.70	43.40	40.60	37.96	35.49	31.94	28.43	26.16	25.37	22.07	18.76
Ground-mounted	agricultural fields	45.70	43.40	40.60	37.96	35.49	31.94	28.43	—	—	—	—
Ground-mounted	other	45.70	43.40	40.60	37.96	35.49	31.94	28.43	25.02	24.26	21.11	17.94
Installations on agricultural fields were excluded under the PV Act (2010).

== Politics ==
The development of the EEG has been the subject of political science analysis. A 2006 study finds that "the regulatory framework is formed in a 'battle over institutions' where the German parliament, informed and supported by an advocacy coalition of growing strength, backed support policies for renewables sourced electricity against often reluctant governments and the opposition from nuclear and coal interests".

A 2016 thesis finds that two broad coalition of actors faced each other off over the development of the EEG legislation: an 'economic coalition' that opposed support for renewables and sought to protect nuclear power and fossil fuel interests and an 'environmental coalition' that took the opposite stance. The economic coalition wanted unassisted market competition to prevail and preferred large-scale facilities. The environmental coalition comprised environmental organizations, the renewables industry, farmers, the metal workers unions (IG BCE and IG Metall), a German engineering association (VDMA), partly the German Confederation of Skilled Crafts (ZDH), and some industrial corporations with renewables interests. When the EEG was proposed in the late-1990s, the incumbent energy companies markedly underestimated the technological potential of renewables, believing them to be suitable only for niche roles. They were not alone, almost all politicians and scientists of the time did so too. The opposition to the EEG was therefore muted. Concurrent lobbying over the nuclear phase-out (Atomausstieg) also diverted industry attention away from the EEG negotiations. Notwithstanding, the success of the EEG can be traced a small dedicated group of parliamentarians who forged an alliance between various business groups, unions, environmental NGOs, and other idealistic interest groups. Yet despite expectations, renewable generation came to account for 27.4% of gross electricity consumption in 2014 and seriously threatened the business model of the incumbents. As history shows, the environmental coalition prevailed till 2014 at least, underpinning the development of the EEG legislation, the nuclear phase-out, and the German Energiewende more generally.

Greenpeace Germany believes that ongoing EU/US TTIP trade agreement negotiations have influenced the EEG (2014) onwards. Earlier versions of the EEG could be interpreted as inhibiting free trade and that granting renewable energy preferential dispatch may still be illegal under the proposed treaty.

== Effectiveness ==
Between 2015 and 2017, the fixed feed-in tariff scheme, introduced in 1991, is being phased out for around 80% of installations in favor of an auction system. This change is defined under the EEG (2014) and subsequent legislation.

=== Feed-in tariff scheme (pre-2015–2017) ===
Various studies have found that a fixed feed-in tariff scheme provides financial certainty and is more cost effective and less bureaucratic than other forms of support, including investment or production tax credits, quota-based renewable portfolio standards (RPS), and auction mechanisms. In 2008 the European Commission concluded that (although in 2014 it reversed its position to favor market-based instruments):

Well-adapted feed-in tariff regimes are generally the most efficient and effective support schemes for promoting renewable electricity.

— European Commission, 23 January 2008

When the avoided external costs are compared to the compensation that renewable energy operators were paid for electricity from renewable energy, a 2003 study finds that the reduced environmental impacts and related economic benefits far outweigh the additional costs required to compensate the producers of electricity from renewable sources. Accounting for the external costs of fossil fuel use and thus "level[ing] the playing field" had been one of the key purposes when constructing the original EEG. A feed-in tariff scheme generates more competition, more jobs, and more rapid deployment for manufacturing and does not require the picking of technological winners, such as between wind power and photovoltaics. Denmark and Germany have been at the forefront of FIT scheme development.

A 2008 economics study by RWI Essen was hugely critical of the high levels of feed-in support afforded photovoltaics. The study argues that the 2005 European Union Emission Trading Scheme (EU ETS) was sufficient to drive the transition towards a low-carbon economy, that the EEG does nothing intrinsic to reduce greenhouse gas emissions, and that the electricity produced represents one of the most expensive greenhouse gas abatement options on offer.

=== Auction system (post-2015–2017) ===
In June 2016 economist Claudia Kemfert from DIW Berlin contended that the new auction system, introduced with the EEG (2014) and being refined under the proposed EEG (2016), will not reduce costs, but will rather undermine planning security and increase the risk premium applied by investors. In addition, the auction system will lead to deployment corridors being missed as companies holding tenders delay construction for whatever reason.

=== General ===
The positive impact on the environment globally is less clear. Hans-Werner Sinn, a German economist and chair of the Ifo Institut für Wirtschaftsforschung argues that Germany's renewable energy support reduces world market prices for fossil energy. Thus, countries like China or the US have an incentive to produce more, and the net effect on the climate is zero. This effect is known as the green paradox.

== Outlook ==
=== Grid reinforcement ===
One challenge that lies ahead is integrating the electricity generated by decentralized renewable energy into the existing electricity grid structure. The grid was built to suit the centralized energy system of the then four main energy companies, namely, E.ON, EnBW, RWE, and Vattenfall. (Note: As of September 2016, these companies are joined by Innogy (RWE's green subsidiary) and Uniper (conventional generation split from E.ON).)

The need for grid reinforcement from north to south is commonly recognized. In response, the four TSOs proposed 92 expansion projects covering 7300 km of lines, but not all will be required or approved. In 2015 the Federal Network Agency (Bundesnetzagentur) released its report on grid expansion plans covering the next decade. (Note: Onshore Electricity Grid Development Plan 2015/2025 (NEP 2015/2025) and the Offshore Electricity Grid Development Plan 2015/2025 (Offshore NEP 2015/2025).) Rapid development of the grid is being driven by the uptake of renewables and the phase-out of nuclear power.

But not all experts agree that a substantial build-out of the grid is necessary. Claudia Kemfert believes the large amount of coal-fired generation on the system is part of the problem. Kemfert said "our studies and models show that grid extension does no harm, but it's not strictly necessary ... decentralised, intelligent grids with demand management and, in the medium term, storage, would be much more important." Analysis for Greenpeace Germany in 2016 also suggests that it is inflexible coal and nuclear plants that are clogging the grid and driving up wholesale electricity prices.

=== Deployment corridors ===
The EEG (2014) specifies technology-specific deployment corridors (see table) which will be tracked by the new auction system. Environmental NGOs and renewable energy advocates argue that these corridors are insufficient to meet Germany's climate protection goals. Greenpeace Germany observes "to reduce renewables to 45% in 2025 means expanding the fossil [fuel] share to 55%, with the aim of mitigating the impact on large utilities". Patrick Graichen from the Berlin energy policy institute Agora Energiewende agrees that the deployment corridors are set too low to reach renewables targets beyond 2025.

A 2016 report by Volker Quaschning of HTW Berlin concludes that Germany will need to accelerate its renewables uptake by a factor of four or five to reach the lower 2015 Paris Agreement global warming target of 1.5 °C. Moreover, this target will require the energy sector to be carbon free by 2040. Give the likely electrification of the transport and heating sectors, the deployment corridors laid out in the EEG (2014) are wholly inadequate. Onshore wind generation should instead grow by 6.3 GW net per year (2.8 GW is specified) and photovoltaics by 15 GW_{p} (2.5 GW_{p} is specified).

=== Economic aspects ===
A 2011 paper from DIW Berlin modeled the deployment of various renewable energy technologies until 2030 and quantified the associated economic effects. The uptake of renewable energy simultaneously creates business opportunities and imposes social costs for promotion. The study reveals that the continued expansion of renewable energy in Germany should benefit both economic growth and employment in the mid-term.

The Berlin energy policy institute Agora Energiewende predicts that the EEG surcharge will peak around 2023 and then decline. The reasons being that expensive projects committed at the beginning of the EEG in 2000 will begin to expire after their 20 years of support, that new projects are now much cheaper, and that the trend of reducing generation cost will continue.

=== Energy sector transformation ===
In November 2016, Agora Energiewende reported on the new EEG (2017) and several other related new laws. It concludes that this new legislation will bring "fundamental changes" for large sections of the energy industry, but have limited impact on the economy and on consumers.

== See also ==
- Electric power transmission
- Electricity sector in Germany
- Energiewende in Germany
- Energy in Germany
- Energy law
- Energy policy
- Feed-in tariffs in Germany
- Financial incentives for photovoltaics
- German Climate Action Plan 2050
- Germany National Renewable Energy Action Plan
- Green paradox
- Power-to-X
- Renewable energy in Germany
- Renewable energy law
- Solar power in Germany
- Vehicle-to-grid
- Wind power in Germany
- World energy consumption
