= Clean tech law =

Clean Tech Law contemplates a diverse set of legal and policy issues related to the development and commercialization of clean technology. These issues range from conventional natural resources law to cutting-edge intellectual property issues related to synthetic genomics and advanced materials. Clean tech law could also address issues and conflicts surrounding the placement of such technologies (e.g., glare from solar panels).

== History ==
The term clean tech, or cleantech, is short for clean technology. The abbreviated use of the term first appeared on October 10, 1990 in the Xinhua General News Service. Now, clean tech, is generally considered to include multiple advanced technologies in four economic sectors: energy, water, materials, and transportation. These technologies break down in the following categories:

- Energy Generation
- Energy Storage
- Energy Infrastructure
- Energy Efficiency
- Transportation
- Water & Wastewater
- Air & Environment
- Materials
- Manufacturing/Industrial
- Agriculture
- Recycling & Waste

== Basic issues ==
As a discrete legal field, clean tech law is in its infancy and so vaguely defined that it focuses as much on more familiar areas like liability and ownership as it does business models and corporate strategies. The transactional side of clean tech law revolved around development and commercializing of new technologies in renewable energy, pollution, and other frontiers in the fight against climate change and protection of natural resources, and the creation of green jobs. In addition, the basic economics are inseparable from substantive social and ethical issues posed by these emerging technologies. The more traditional legal areas of clean technology law include intellectual property, patent law, licensing, litigation, and federal and state legislative, landuse and regulatory issues.

== See also ==
- Intellectual property
- Clean technology
- Sustainability
- Patent law
- Renewable energy
- Climate change
- Renewable energy law
- Synthetic genomics
- Natural resource
