= Feed-in premium =

A feed-in premium (FIP) is a policy mechanism designed to support investment in renewable energy. In a FIP, renewable energy producers sell to the electricity market and receive a payment (premium) in addition to the market price.

== See also ==
- Feed-in tariff
