= Renewable energy law =

Renewable energy law is a particular kind of energy law, and relates primarily to the transactional legal and policy issues that surround the development, implementation, and commercialization of renewable sources of energy, such as solar, wind, geothermal and tidal. Renewable energy, (RE) law also relates to the land use, siting, and finance issues encountered by developers of renewable energy projects.

== Renewable energy support laws ==
Renewable energy law also encompasses policies that relate to renewable energy and legislative instruments that further encourage its growth.

=== Feed-in tariffs ===
One such form of legislation is feed-in tariffs, which provide economic incentives to the developers of renewable energy projects by setting a fixed price for the sale of energy produced from renewable sources. Feed-in tariff laws also provide financial certainty, are more cost effective and less bureaucratic than other support schemes such as investment or production tax credits, quota based renewable portfolio standards (RPS), and auction mechanisms. In addition, the feed-in tariff generates more competition, more jobs, and more rapid deployment for manufacturing; it also does not pick technological winners, for instance between more mature wind power technology versus solar photovoltaics technology.

=== Renewable Portfolio standards ===
This type of law is in force in 37 of the States within the United States, as well as Australia and a minority of European nations. It works by fixing the quantity of renewable electricity that must be produced, and leaving it to the market at what price this extra renewable electricity will be produced. This form of legislation typically employs a tradeable certificates mechanism, where 1 Megawatt Hour of electricity is equivalent to 1 renewable energy certificate.

== Sector Regulation ==
The Role of the Sector Regulator is specified in the enabling legislation. For example, regulatory oversight of feed-in tariff programs is essential, whether the price is based on a predetermined number (and with some maximum capacity), an auction/bidding process, or avoided cost. In each case, the regulator monitors activities to ensure abuses do not arise. How external (environmental and health) costs are factored into program evaluation is partly dependent on the enabling legislation (or executive order). If the law establishes Renewable Portfolio Standards, the energy regulator will need to oversee the system and evaluate its effectiveness in meeting RE objectives. Generally, some other agency is responsible for certifying the generators and handling the certification system.

The sector regulator has a number of roles and responsibilities for operationalizing and implementing RE. The policy instruments include those oriented towards prices and quantities. The former (such as Feed-in Tariffs) provide the supplier with certainty regarding price, but the volume depends on whether that price is high or relatively low. The latter includes renewable portfolio standards that require distribution companies to purchase specific quantities of electricity generated by renewable technologies.

In addition, the sector regulator is in a position to give advice to the government regarding the full implications of focusing on climate change or energy security. Policymakers, however, may choose to delegate these decisions, or a subset of them, to regulators; on the other hand, they may choose to remain silent on such issues. In the former case, of course, regulators have the power to exercise their discretion. In the latter case, the scope of regulatory discretion depends on what the legal system provides. In either case, the internal practices followed by the regulator need to provide legitimacy for regulatory rulings related to RE. Such practices include transparency and evidence-based decision-making.

== Renewable energy lawyers ==
Renewable energy lawyers focus their practice on serving the legal needs of renewable energy project developers and companies that develop clean technologies (see clean tech law).

== Renewable energy laws by country ==
=== China ===
China passed its first Renewable Energy Law in 2005. The law established China's framework for regulating renewable energy. It also created four mechanisms designed to promote the development of China's renewable energy: (1) a national renewable energy target, (2) a mandatory connection and purchase policy, (3) a feed-in tariff system, and (4) a cost-sharing mechanism which includes a fund for renewable energy development. Implementing the renewable energy law expanded the market for renewable technology.

In 2009, China amended the Renewable Energy Law to improve the process through which renewable energy is connected to the power grid and distributed. These amendments also sought to address interprovincial equity in bearing to costs associated with developing renewable energy.

As of 2026, China has the world's largest installed capacity of hydro, solar and wind power.

=== Germany ===
A chart summarizing German energy legislation is available.

Germany is a global leader in renewable energy legislation. To lower carbon emissions, Germany is undergoing an energy transition from things like fossils fuels to renewable energies such as wind power. This transition is known as Energiewende directly translating to 'energy transition'. The process of implementing these Energiewende started in the 1990s and continues to this day. To speed up investment to support Renewable energy systems, feed-in tariffs are put in to place with most offering a long-term contract for twenty years. With these feed in tariffs, the primary consumption of energy while using renewable resources has grown from 1.9% in 1995 to 12.6% in 2015. This transition is also heavily supported by the German people; with 92% saying they support implementing more renewable energy systems. One of the most used renewable energy sources used is onshore wind power. Just over 35.5% of electricity from renewable sources comes from onshore wind power and it is claimed to be the most cost efficient renewable source.

=== Switzerland ===
de:Energiegesetz (Schweiz)

== Renewable energy laws by technology ==
Renewable energy laws can either be 'technology neutral' or provide specific assistance to particular selected groupings of renewable energy technology. Other aspects of land use planning law can have particular application to the implications of particular energy technologies, such as wind power.

=== Hydroelectric energy law ===
Conventional hydroelectric dams in most countries are highly regulated, with environmental reviews before construction and operational limits afterwards. Operation normally places river conditions before power interest, ie: power generation may not be needed at night while rivers are kept flowing.

=== Geothermal energy law ===
Laws and Regulations Applicable to Geothermal Energy Development. ... A number of federal laws, regulations, and Executive Orders apply to geothermal energy development activities. For the most part, state laws and regulations do not apply to geothermal energy development on tribal lands

== See also ==
- Clean tech law
- Energy policy of the European Union
- Environmental law
- Sustainable energy
- Grid connection
- Politics of energy transformation
- Reverse auction
