= List of Federal Republic of Germany governments =

This is a list of the successive governments of the Federal Republic of Germany from the time of the introduction of the Basic Law in 1949.

== List ==
=== 1st Bundestag ===
Term	Chancellor	Vice Chancellor	Cabinet	Parties	Seats
1949–1953	Konrad Adenauer	Franz Blücher	Adenauer I	CDU	208 of 402
1949–1953	Konrad Adenauer	Franz Blücher	Adenauer I	FDP	208 of 402
1949–1953	Konrad Adenauer	Franz Blücher	Adenauer I	CSU	208 of 402
1949–1953	Konrad Adenauer	Franz Blücher	Adenauer I	DP	208 of 402
=== 2nd Bundestag ===
Term	Chancellor	Vice Chancellor	Cabinet	Parties	Seats
1953–1957	Konrad Adenauer	Franz Blücher	Adenauer II	CDU	333 of 487
1953–1957	Konrad Adenauer	Franz Blücher	Adenauer II	FDP	333 of 487
1953–1957	Konrad Adenauer	Franz Blücher	Adenauer II	CSU	333 of 487
1953–1957	Konrad Adenauer	Franz Blücher	Adenauer II	DP	333 of 487
1953–1957	Konrad Adenauer	Franz Blücher	Adenauer II	GB/BHE	333 of 487
=== 3rd Bundestag ===
Term	Chancellor	Vice Chancellor	Cabinet	Parties	Seats
1957–1961	Konrad Adenauer	Ludwig Erhard	Adenauer III	CDU	287 of 497
1957–1961	Konrad Adenauer	Ludwig Erhard	Adenauer III	CSU	287 of 497
1957–1961	Konrad Adenauer	Ludwig Erhard	Adenauer III	DP	287 of 497
=== 4th Bundestag ===
Term	Chancellor	Vice Chancellor	Cabinets	Parties	Seats
1961–1962	Konrad Adenauer	Ludwig Erhard	Adenauer IV	CDU	309 of 499
1961–1962	Konrad Adenauer	Ludwig Erhard	Adenauer IV	FDP	309 of 499
1961–1962	Konrad Adenauer	Ludwig Erhard	Adenauer IV	CSU	309 of 499
1963–1965	Ludwig Erhard	Erich Mende	Erhard I	CDU	309 of 499
1963–1965	Ludwig Erhard	Erich Mende	Erhard I	FDP	309 of 499
1963–1965	Ludwig Erhard	Erich Mende	Erhard I	CSU	309 of 499
=== 5th Bundestag ===
Term	Chancellor	Vice Chancellor	Cabinet	Parties	Seats
1965–1966	Ludwig Erhard	Erich Mende	Erhard II	CDU	294 of 496
1965–1966	Ludwig Erhard	Erich Mende	Erhard II	FDP	294 of 496
1965–1966	Ludwig Erhard	Erich Mende	Erhard II	CSU	294 of 496
1966–1969	Kurt Georg Kiesinger	Willy Brandt	Kiesinger	CDU	447 of 496
1966–1969	Kurt Georg Kiesinger	Willy Brandt	Kiesinger	SPD	447 of 496
1966–1969	Kurt Georg Kiesinger	Willy Brandt	Kiesinger	CSU	447 of 496
=== 6th Bundestag ===
Term	Chancellor	Vice Chancellor	Cabinet	Parties	Seats
1969–1972	Willy Brandt	Walter Scheel	Brandt I	SPD	254 of 496
1969–1972	Willy Brandt	Walter Scheel	Brandt I	FDP	254 of 496
=== 7th Bundestag ===
Term	Chancellor	Vice Chancellor	Cabinet	Parties	Seats
1972–1974	Willy Brandt	Walter Scheel	Brandt II	SPD	271 of 496
1972–1974	Willy Brandt	Walter Scheel	Brandt II	FDP	271 of 496
1974–1976	Helmut Schmidt	Hans-Dietrich Genscher	Schmidt I	SPD	271 of 496
1974–1976	Helmut Schmidt	Hans-Dietrich Genscher	Schmidt I	FDP	271 of 496
=== 8th Bundestag ===
Term	Chancellor	Vice Chancellor	Cabinet	Parties	Seats
1976–1980	Helmut Schmidt	Hans-Dietrich Genscher	Schmidt II	SPD	253 of 496
1976–1980	Helmut Schmidt	Hans-Dietrich Genscher	Schmidt II	FDP	253 of 496
=== 9th Bundestag ===
Term	Chancellor	Vice Chancellor	Cabinet	Parties	Seats
1980–1982	Helmut Schmidt	Hans-Dietrich Genscher	Schmidt III	SPD	271 of 497
1980–1982	Helmut Schmidt	Hans-Dietrich Genscher	Schmidt III	FDP	271 of 497
1982–1983	Helmut Kohl	Hans-Dietrich Genscher	Kohl I	CDU	279 of 497
1982–1983	Helmut Kohl	Hans-Dietrich Genscher	Kohl I	FDP	279 of 497
1982–1983	Helmut Kohl	Hans-Dietrich Genscher	Kohl I	CSU	279 of 497
=== 10th Bundestag ===
Term	Chancellor	Vice Chancellor	Cabinet	Parties	Seats
1983–1987	Helmut Kohl	Hans-Dietrich Genscher	Kohl II	CDU	278 of 498
1983–1987	Helmut Kohl	Hans-Dietrich Genscher	Kohl II	FDP	278 of 498
1983–1987	Helmut Kohl	Hans-Dietrich Genscher	Kohl II	CSU	278 of 498
=== 11th Bundestag ===
Term	Chancellor	Vice Chancellor	Cabinet	Parties	Seats
1987–1991	Helmut Kohl	Hans-Dietrich Genscher	Kohl III	CDU	269 of 497
1987–1991	Helmut Kohl	Hans-Dietrich Genscher	Kohl III	FDP	269 of 497
1987–1991	Helmut Kohl	Hans-Dietrich Genscher	Kohl III	CSU	269 of 497
=== 12th Bundestag ===
Term	Chancellor	Vice Chancellor	Cabinet	Parties	Seats
1991–1994	Helmut Kohl	Hans-Dietrich Genscher (1990–1992); Klaus Kinkel (1992–1994)	Kohl IV	CDU	398 of 662
1991–1994	Helmut Kohl	Hans-Dietrich Genscher (1990–1992); Klaus Kinkel (1992–1994)	Kohl IV	FDP	398 of 662
1991–1994	Helmut Kohl	Hans-Dietrich Genscher (1990–1992); Klaus Kinkel (1992–1994)	Kohl IV	CSU	398 of 662
=== 13th Bundestag ===
Term	Chancellor	Vice Chancellor	Cabinet	Parties	Seats
1994–1998	Helmut Kohl	Klaus Kinkel	Kohl V	CDU	341 of 672
1994–1998	Helmut Kohl	Klaus Kinkel	Kohl V	FDP	341 of 672
1994–1998	Helmut Kohl	Klaus Kinkel	Kohl V	CSU	341 of 672
=== 14th Bundestag ===
Term	Chancellor	Vice Chancellor	Cabinet	Parties	Seats
1998–2002	Gerhard Schröder	Joschka Fischer	Schröder I	SPD	342 of 669
1998–2002	Gerhard Schröder	Joschka Fischer	Schröder I	Greens	342 of 669
=== 15th Bundestag ===
Term	Chancellor	Vice Chancellor	Cabinet	Parties	Seats
2002–2005	Gerhard Schröder	Joschka Fischer	Schröder II	SPD	306 of 603
2002–2005	Gerhard Schröder	Joschka Fischer	Schröder II	Greens	306 of 603
=== 16th Bundestag ===
Term	Chancellor	Vice Chancellor	Cabinet	Parties	Seats
2005–2009	Angela Merkel	Franz Müntefering (2005–2007); Frank-Walter Steinmeier (2007–2009)	Merkel I	CDU	448 of 614
2005–2009	Angela Merkel	Franz Müntefering (2005–2007); Frank-Walter Steinmeier (2007–2009)	Merkel I	SPD	448 of 614
2005–2009	Angela Merkel	Franz Müntefering (2005–2007); Frank-Walter Steinmeier (2007–2009)	Merkel I	CSU	448 of 614
=== 17th Bundestag ===
Term	Chancellor	Vice Chancellor	Cabinet	Parties	Seats
2009–2013	Angela Merkel	Guido Westerwelle (2009–2011); Philipp Rösler (2011–2013)	Merkel II	CDU	332 of 622
2009–2013	Angela Merkel	Guido Westerwelle (2009–2011); Philipp Rösler (2011–2013)	Merkel II	FDP	332 of 622
2009–2013	Angela Merkel	Guido Westerwelle (2009–2011); Philipp Rösler (2011–2013)	Merkel II	CSU	332 of 622
=== 18th Bundestag ===
Term	Chancellor	Vice Chancellor	Cabinet	Parties	Seats
2013–2018	Angela Merkel	Sigmar Gabriel	Merkel III	CDU	504 of 631
2013–2018	Angela Merkel	Sigmar Gabriel	Merkel III	SPD	504 of 631
2013–2018	Angela Merkel	Sigmar Gabriel	Merkel III	CSU	504 of 631
=== 19th Bundestag ===
Term	Chancellor	Vice Chancellor	Cabinet	Parties	Seats
2018–2021	Angela Merkel	Olaf Scholz	Merkel IV	CDU	399 of 709
2018–2021	Angela Merkel	Olaf Scholz	Merkel IV	SPD	399 of 709
2018–2021	Angela Merkel	Olaf Scholz	Merkel IV	CSU	399 of 709
=== 20th Bundestag ===
Term	Chancellor	Vice Chancellor	Cabinet	Parties	Seats
2021–2025	Olaf Scholz	Robert Habeck	Scholz	SPD	416 of 736
2021–2025	Olaf Scholz	Robert Habeck	Scholz	Greens	416 of 736
2021–2025	Olaf Scholz	Robert Habeck	Scholz	FDP	416 of 736
=== 21st Bundestag ===
Term	Chancellor	Vice Chancellor	Cabinet	Parties	Seats
2025–present	Friedrich Merz	Lars Klingbeil	Merz	CDU	328 of 630
2025–present	Friedrich Merz	Lars Klingbeil	Merz	SPD	328 of 630
2025–present	Friedrich Merz	Lars Klingbeil	Merz	CSU	328 of 630

== See also ==
- Government of Germany
- Chancellor of Germany
- Vice-Chancellor of Germany
- Cabinet of Germany
