= Feed-in tariffs in Germany =

Feed-in tariff for rooftop solar PV
Development of feed-in tariffs for small rooftop PV systems smaller than 10 kW_{p} capacity since 2001 in ¢/kWh

Feed-in electricity tariffs (FiT) were introduced in Germany to encourage the use of new energy technologies such as wind power, biomass, hydropower, geothermal power and solar photovoltaics. Feed-in tariffs are a policy mechanism designed to accelerate investment in renewable energy technologies by providing them remuneration (a "tariff") above the retail or wholesale rates of electricity. The mechanism provides long-term security to renewable energy producers, typically based on the cost of generation of each technology. Technologies such as wind power, for instance, are awarded a lower per-kWh price, while technologies such as solar PV and tidal power are offered a higher price, reflecting higher costs. A downside of generous feed-in tariffs is that wind or photovoltaic generation is not always installed in locations where it is the most needed or where it can produce the most power.

As of July 2014, feed-in tariffs range from 3.33 ¢/kWh (4.4 ¢/kWh) for hydropower facilities over 50 MW to 12.88 ¢/kWh (17.3 ¢/kWh) for solar installations on buildings up to 30 kW_{p} and 19 ¢/kWh (25.5 ¢/kWh) for offshore wind.

On 1 August 2014, a revised Renewable Energy Sources Act or EEG (2014) (colloquially called EEG 2.0) entered into force. The government will now stipulate specific deployment corridors to control the uptake of renewables and the feed-in tariffs themselves will be determined by auction.

The aim is to meet Germany's renewable energy goals of 40 to 45% of electricity consumption in 2025 and 55% to 60% in 2035. The policy also aims to encourage the development of renewable technologies, reduce external costs, and increase security of energy supply.

In the first half of 2014, 28.5% of gross electricity production in Germany came from renewable sources. The Federal Environment Ministry estimated that renewables were to save 87 million tonnes of carbon dioxide by 2012. The average level of feed-in tariff was 9.53 ¢/kWh in 2005 (compared to an average cost of displaced energy of 4.7 ¢/kWh). In 2004, the total level of reallocated EEG surcharges was €2.4 billion, at a cost per consumer of 0.56 ¢/kWh (3% of household electricity costs). By 2013, the figure had risen to €20.4 billion. The tariffs are lowered every year to encourage more efficient production of renewable energy. By 2014, the EEG surcharge – which pays for the additional costs through feed-in tariffs – had increased to 6.24 ¢/kWh. As of July 2014, the regular reductions (degressions) were 1.5% per year for electricity from onshore wind and 1% per month for electricity from photovoltaics.

The solar sector employed about 56,000 people in 2013, a strong decline from previous years, due to many insolvencies and business closures. Although most of the installed solar panels are nowadays imported from China, the Fraunhofer institute ISE estimates, that only about 30% of the EEG apportionment outflows to China, while the rest is still spent domestically. The institute also predicts that Germany's solar manufacturing sector will improve its competitive situation in the future.

== Progression of solar PV FiTs before 2012 ==
The feed-in tariff system has been modified frequently. The feed-in tariff, in force since 1 August 2004, was modified in 2008. In view of the unexpectedly high growth rates, the depreciation was accelerated and a new category (>1000 kW_{p}) was created with a lower tariff. The facade premium was abolished. In July 2010, the Renewable Energy Sources Act was again amended to reduce the tariffs by a further 16% in addition to the normal annual depreciation, as the prices for PV panels had dropped sharply in 2009. Another modification of the EEG occurred in 2011, when part of the degression foreseen for 2012 was brought forward to mid-2011 as a response to unexpectedly high installations in the course of 2010.

Feed-in tariffs for newly installed photovoltaic systems paid over 20 years [¢/kWh]
Type		2004	2005	2006	2007	2008	2009	2010	July 2010	October 2010	2011	January 2012
Rooftop-mounted	up to 30 kW_{p}	57.40	54.53	51.80	49.21	46.75	43.01	39.14	34.05	33.03	28.74	24.43
Rooftop-mounted	above 30 kW_{p}	54.60	51.87	49.28	46.82	44.48	40.91	37.23	32.39	31.42	27.33	23.23
Rooftop-mounted	above 100 kW_{p}	54.00	51.30	48.74	46.30	43.99	39.58	35.23	30.65	29.73	25.86	21.98
Rooftop-mounted	above 1000 kW_{p}	54.00	51.30	48.74	46.30	43.99	33.00	29.37	25.55	24.79	21.56	18.33
Ground-mounted	conversion areas	45.70	43.40	40.60	37.96	35.49	31.94	28.43	26.16	25.37	22.07	18.76
Ground-mounted	agricultural fields	45.70	43.40	40.60	37.96	35.49	31.94	28.43	—	—	—	—
Ground-mounted	other	45.70	43.40	40.60	37.96	35.49	31.94	28.43	25.02	24.26	21.11	17.94
Installations on agricultural fields were removed under the PV Act (2010).

The support duration is 20 years plus the year of project commissioning, constant remuneration. Feed-in tariffs was lowered repeatedly (decreasing by 9% default and a maximum of 24% per year). Degression will be accelerated or slowed down by three percentage points for every 1000 MW_{p}/a divergence from the target of 3500 MW_{p}/a.

== Progression of solar PV FiTs since 2012 ==
As of July 2014, feed-in tariffs for photovoltaic systems range from 12.88 ¢/kWh for small roof-top system, down to 8.92 ¢/kWh for large utility scaled solar parks. Also, FiTs are restricted to PV system with a maximum capacity of 10 MW_{p}. The feed-in tariff for solar PV is declining at a faster rate than for any other renewable technology.

Feed-in tariffs for solar PV since April 2012 [¢/kWh]
Year	Month	Degression	Rooftop mounted				Ground mounted up to 10 MW_{p}
Year	Month	Degression	up to 10 kW_{p}	up to 40 kW_{p}	up to 1 MW_{p}	up to 10 MW_{p}	Ground mounted up to 10 MW_{p}
2012	April	—	19.50	18.50	16.50	13.50	13.50
2012	May	1.0%	19.31	18.32	16.34	13.37	13.37
2012	June	1.0%	19.11	18.13	16.17	13.23	13.23
2012	July	1.0%	18.92	17.95	16.01	13.10	13.10
2012	August	1.0%	18.73	17.77	15.85	12.97	12.97
2012	September	1.0%	18.54	17.59	15.69	12.84	12.84
2012	October	1.0%	18.36	17.42	15.53	12.71	12.71
2012	November	2.5%	17.90	16.98	15.15	12.39	12.39
2012	December	2.5%	17.45	16.56	14.77	12.08	12.08
2013	January	2.5%	17.02	16.14	14.40	11.78	11.78
2013	February	2.2%	16.64	15.79	14.08	11.52	11.52
2013	March	2.2%	16.28	15.44	13.77	11.27	11.27
2013	April	2.2%	15.92	15.10	13.47	11.02	11.02
2013	May	1.8%	15.63	14.83	13.23	10.82	10.82
2013	June	1.8%	15.35	14.56	12.99	10.63	10.63
2013	July	1.8%	15.07	14.30	12.75	10.44	10.44
2013	August	1.8%	14.80	14.04	12.52	10.25	10.25
2013	September	1.8%	14.54	13.79	12.30	10.06	10.06
2013	October	1.8%	14.27	13.54	12.08	9.88	9.88
2013	November	1.4%	14.07	13.35	11.91	9.74	9.74
2013	December	1.4%	13.88	13.17	11.74	9.61	9.61
2014	January	1.4%	13.68	12.98	11.58	9.47	9.47
2014	February	1.0%	13.55	12.85	11.46	9.38	9.38
2014	March	1.0%	13.41	12.72	11.35	9.28	9.28
2014	April	1.0%	13.28	12.60	11.23	9.19	9.19
2014	May	1.0%	13.14	12.47	11.12	9.10	9.10
2014	June	1.0%	13.01	12.34	11.01	9.01	9.01
2014	July	1.0%	12.88	12.22	10.90	8.92	8.92
Maximum remuneration part			100%	90%	90%	100%	100%

== Renewable Energy Sources Act (2014) ==
On 1 August 2014, a revised Renewable Energy Sources Act entered into force. Specific deployment corridors now stipulate the extent to which renewable energy is to be expanded in the future and the funding rates (feed-in tariffs) gradually will no longer be fixed by the government, but will be determined by auction. Wind and solar power are to be targeted over hydro, gas (landfill gas, sewage gas, and mine gas), geothermal, and biomass. In late 2015, this new scheme is being tested, as a pilot project, for ground-mounted PV installations. With the Renewable Energy Sources Act (2017), auctions will become commonplace for new installations also for most other types of renewables.

== See also ==
- Energiewende in Germany
- German Renewable Energy Sources Act, also known as the EEG
