= Elizabeth Socolow =

American poet

Elizabeth Socolow is an American poet.

== Life ==
She is a native of New York City, has taught at Rutgers University, Vassar College, Yale University, Barnard College, Wayne State University, University of Michigan Dearborn.

A member of U.S. 1 Poets’ Cooperative, She edited U.S. 1 Worksheets, and is poetry editor of the Newsletter of the Society for Literature, Science and the Arts.

Her work has appeared in numerous publications, including Ploughshares, Nimrod, The Berkeley Poet's Cooperative, Pudding, Fellowship in Prayer, and Ms. Magazine.

She lives in Lawrenceville, New Jersey.

== Family ==
She was married to Robert H. Socolow, professor of engineering at Princeton University. They have two sons. David Jacob Socolow, was chief of staff for Representative Robert E. Andrews, of New Jersey, and is commissioner of labor for New Jersey.

== Awards ==
- 1987 Barnard Women Poets Prize, for Laughing at Gravity: Conversations with Isaac Newton.

== Works ==
=== Poetry ===
- "Queer". PPL poetry podcast blog. 21 April 2007.
- Laughing at Gravity: Conversations with Isaac Newton. Beacon Press. 1988. ISBN 978-0-8070-6805-2.
- Between Silence and Praise. Ragged Sky Press. 2006. ISBN 978-0-9633092-7-3.

=== Anthologies ===
- Laurence Goldstein, ed. (1991). The Female Body: Figures, Styles, Speculations. University of Michigan Press. ISBN 978-0-472-06477-9.
- Gerry LaFemina; Chad Prevost, eds. (2006). Evensong: Contemporary American Poets on Spirituality. Bottom Dog Press. ISBN 978-1-933964-01-0.
- Cynthia Moskowitz Brody, ed. (2001). Bittersweet legacy: creative responses to the Holocaust : art, poetry, stories. University Press of America. ISBN 978-0-7618-1976-9.

=== Translator ===
- Blaga Dimitrova; Tara Ali Baig; Ludmilla G. Popova-Wightman; Subir Roy; Elizabeth Socolow (1980). The Forbidden Sea. Translator Ludmilla G. Popova-Wightman, Elizabeth Socolow. Thomson Press. ISBN 978-1-930214-06-4. reprint Ivy Press, 2000, ISBN 978-1-930214-01-9
