= Climate stabilization wedge =

Proposed approach for mitigating climate change

Climate stabilization wedges are used to describe possible climate change mitigation scenarios and their impact, through the grouping of different types of interventions into "wedges" representing potential decreases in CO_{2} emissions. When stacked on top of each other, wedges form a "stabilization triangle" that represents the estimated amount of carbon that needs to be removed from the atmosphere to flatten carbon emissions and prevent atmospheric carbon from doubling. This framework is used to organize complex information about mitigation strategies for presentation to policy makers and the public, with the goal of stimulating both technological change and policy actions to deploy precommercial and existing technologies.

The approach presents global warming as a problem which can be attacked using commercially available technologies to reduce CO_{2} emissions. Selecting a set of mitigation strategies to create a stabilization triangle is a planning framework for identifying possible interventions for the reduction of emissions. The objective is to stabilize CO_{2} concentrations under 500 ppm over fifty years, by choosing strategies for mitigation as represented by wedges. Each wedge represents 25 gigatons of avoided carbon emissions over a fifty-year period.

This approach to presenting complex information about mitigation was introduced in 2004 by Princeton University researchers Stephen Pacala and Robert H. Socolow. In 2004, Pacala and Socolow estimated that seven wedges worth of improvements would be needed to mitigate climate change by 2054, if serious actions were taken immediately. In 2011, they increased their estimate from seven to nine wedges, given the ongoing increase in emissions since the original 2004 paper. Some researchers have estimated that the number of wedges needed to mitigate climate change may be much higher. A 2020 update by the Carbon Mitigation Initiative projected mitigation efforts to 2060 with eight wedges. Both the urgency and the difficulty of achieving substantial changes are emphasized.

In 2021, a summary of progress towards 16 climate mitigation strategies, expressed in terms of stabilization wedges, reported that while some areas have seen substantial progress (e.g. improving vehicle efficiency) others have seen little or negative progress (e.g. loss of tropical tree cover in Asia and Africa). Net progress as of 2021 is estimated to be only about 1.5 ± 0.9 of the originally estimated seven wedges.

== Concept ==
A stabilization wedge is an action which incrementally reduces projected emissions. The name is derived from the triangular shape of the gap between reduced and unreduced emissions trajectories when graphed over time. For example, a reduction in electricity demand due to increased efficiency means that less electricity needs to be generated and thus fewer emissions need to be produced. The term originates in the Stabilization Wedge Game.

As a reference unit, a stabilization wedge is equal to the following examples of mitigation initiatives: deployment of two hundred thousand 10 MW wind turbines; completely halting the deforestation and planting of 300 million hectares of trees; the increase in the average energy efficiency of all the world's buildings by 25 percent; or the installation of carbon capture and storage facilities in 800 large coal-fired power plants. Pacala and Socolow proposed in their work, Stabilization Wedges, that seven wedges are required to be delivered by 2050 – at current technologies – to make a significant impact on the mitigation of climate change. There are, however, sources that estimate the need for 14 wedges because Pacala and Socolow's proposal would only stabilize carbon dioxide emissions at current levels but not the atmospheric concentration, which is increasing by more than 2 ppm/year. In 2011, Socolow revised their earlier estimate to nine.

=== Scenario ===
Emissions of CO_{2} and other greenhouse gases have been increasing ever since the Industrial Revolution. If the trend continues to hold, emissions will double by 2055. To prevent the worst consequences of global warming, scientists recommend freezing and reducing net global emissions immediately.

=== Stabilization triangle ===
External videos
- "The Stabilization Triangle: Tackling the Greenhouse Gas Problem with Today's Technologies", High Meadows Environmental Institute.

If global emissions of CO_{2} are graphed for the next 50 years, the difference between the business as usual scenario and the flat path forms a triangle. This triangle is known as the stabilization triangle. Pacala and Socolow initially divided this hypothetical triangle into seven stabilization wedges, which represent different initiatives that must be taken to reduce emissions. When speaking of different strategies to reduce emissions, the language "to reduce one wedge's worth," is often employed. Reducing a projected fourteen gigatons of carbon emissions into seven wedges in a stabilization triangle makes the task easier to conceptualize.

"A wedge represents an activity that reduces emissions to the atmosphere that starts at zero today and increases to 1 giga tonne per year of reduced carbon emissions in 50 years, a cumulative total of 25 giga tonnes of emission reduction over 50 years."

=== Wedge strategies ===
Pacala and Socolow originally presented the wedges concept in Science in 2004. In that paper they identified fifteen different wedge strategies. Regarding the specific number, Socolow says that he and Pacala didn't include all of the possibilities, but that "It was a matter of rhetoric to stop at 15. And exhaustion. There was nothing magic about 15."

Wedges tend to fall into three categories: dealing with energy demand, dealing with energy supply, and dealing with CO_{2} capture and storage. Each wedge represents a billion metric tons of carbon per year. As of 2020 the CMI website presents the fifteen strategies and groups them into nine categories, as follows:

1. Efficiency
2. Fuel switching
3. Carbon capture and storage
4. Forest and agricultural soils
5. Nuclear
6. Wind
7. Solar
8. Biomass fuels
9. Natural sinks

In addition to limiting emissions of CO_{2}, such changes offer public health cobenefits such as reduced air pollution, enhanced fitness, and regulation of infectious disease.

Like many other discussions of global climate change, the majority of Pacala and Socolow's wedges focus on improvements in energy efficiency. A couple address limiting consumption, and none consider population reduction. Yet economic and demographic growth have been identified as fundamental drivers of global climate change. Of the fifteen wedges developed by Pacala and Socolow, only one—halving the number of miles driven by the world's automobile fleet—might be considered a "demand reduction" wedge. Other researchers have discussed the potential for a range of mitigation strategies including modified diet and population growth rate.

== Wedge estimates ==
As of 2004, Pacala and Socolow estimated that seven wedges worth of improvements would be needed to mitigate climate change, if serious actions were immediately taken. In 2011 they released a new estimate in which they suggested that the number of necessary wedges had increased from seven to nine. This increase reflected factors such as the ongoing increase in emissions since the original 2004 paper.

Some researchers have argued that Pacala and Socolow's estimates of the number of climate stabilization wedges needed are optimistic. Martin I. Hoffert was one of the first scientists to predict global warming due to carbon dioxide, while working at Exxon in the 1980s. Hoffert suggested in a 2010 Science article that Pacala and Socolow's 2004 estimates were too low, and that some of their assumptions about declining carbon-to-energy ratios were being countered by increases in natural gas, oil and coal production. Hoffert suggested that as many as 18-25 wedges might be needed. He argues that a massive mobilization, comparable to the Manhattan Project or the Apollo program, is needed to bring needed technologies from being technically possible to operationally possible.

"We have to start working immediately to implement those elements that we know how to implement and we need to start implementing these longer-term programs."

Similarly, in June 2008, Joseph Romm argued in Nature magazine that "If we are to have confidence in our ability to stabilize carbon dioxide levels below 450 p.p.m. emissions must average less than 5 GtC per year over the century. This means accelerating the deployment of the... wedges so they begin to take effect in 2015 and are completely operational in much less time than originally modelled by Socolow and Pacala." Romm emphasized the importance of shifting national and global policy from longer-term to immediate strategies, and the urgency of deploying existing low-carbon technologies.

== Stabilization Wedges Game ==
An example of a self-made Wedge Game board used by the Houston Advanced Research Center.

Stabilization wedges are the basis of a team-based exercise called the Stabilization Wedge Game. This game has become popular as a tool for schools and businesses to educate players and discuss global warming mitigation. The Carbon Mitigation Initiative (CMI) permits anyone to use the game and make use of their materials, provided that they share the results with CMI.

The idea of stabilization wedges is sometimes presented in the form of a team-based exercise called the Stabilization Wedges Game. Because of the simplicity of the wedge game, it has become popular as a communication tool for global warming mitigation. It is used in a variety of arenas and by a variety of players including businessmen, politicians, teachers, and students. David Hawkins, climate director at the Natural Resources Defense Council, puts the ease of use of the Wedge Game this way:

The wedges concept is sort of the iPod of climate policy analysis... It's an understandable, attractive package that people can fill with their own content."

=== Educational Use ===
The Carbon Mitigation Initiative (CMI) permits anyone to use the game and make use of their materials, provided that they share the results with CMI. Because it is so widely accessible, it has become included in certain high school curricula. The Keystone Center has deemed the Stabilization Wedge Game to fulfill the following National Education Standards: S1, S6, LA4, LA5, C4, C5, E1, G1, G5, and WH9.

The American Association for the Advancement of Science hosted a conference for educators at the Hilton in San Francisco in 2007. Collaborating with AAAS were the National Science Teachers Association and the United Educators of San Francisco (representing the National Education Association and the American Federation of Teachers). Socolow and Hotinski personally presented the Stabilization Wedge concept at the event.

=== Business Use ===
The Stabilization Wedge Game is also used as a centerpiece for business seminars. Business executives played the game at as seminar held by the Sustainable Enterprise Academy at York University in Toronto.

=== Criticism ===
Some scientists estimate that substantially higher numbers of wedges may be needed than Pacala and Socolow originally proposed. The game's underlying premise that humanity has the tools and technologies to halt climate change may therefore be overly optimistic.

The Wedge Game has been criticized as being too simple, especially regarding the economic aspects of global warming mitigation. The materials provided by CMI only attach one, two, or three dollar signs to each wedge as a broad estimate of the expense of each option. Richard G. Richels, a senior engineer at the Electric Power Research Institute, says that the lack of economic precision in the game could create misconceptions:

We have to find out what it's going to cost to make it affordable. By not including the cost issue, people come away from this thinking it will be a piece of cake. It's going to require some serious bucks. If the environment is priceless, we should be willing to pay some serious bucks to protect it.

A final criticism is that the Wedge Game focuses on technological fixes rather than fundamentally challenging the endless growth economy that is at the heart of global climate change.

== History ==
The idea of climate stabilization wedges was developed as part of the Carbon Mitigation Initiative (CMI) at Princeton Environmental Institute (now the High Meadows Environmental Institute). The project was funded by Ford Motor Company between 2000 and 2009 and has been receiving funding from BP since 2000. In 2026, ProPublica reported that BP directly contributed to the drafting the Pacala/Scolow paper, which the authors had not disclosed.
