= Richard G. Richels =

American economist

Richard Gayle Richels
- Education: College of William & Mary (BS); Harvard University (MS, PhD)

Richard "Rich" Gayle Richels directs global climate change research at the Electric Power Research Institute. Richels received a BS degree in physics from the College of William & Mary. He was awarded MS and PhD degrees in decision science from Harvard University's Division of Applied Sciences.

Richels has served on a number of national and international advisory panels, including committees of the Department of Energy, the Environmental Protection Agency, and the National Research Council. He served as an expert witness at the Department of Energy's hearings on the National Energy Strategy and testified at Congressional hearings on priorities in global climate change research. He was a lead author for the Intergovernmental Panel on Climate Change (IPCC) Second, Third and Fourth Assessment Reports (the IPCC shared the 2007 Nobel Peace Prize with Al Gore) and served on the Synthesis Team for the US National Assessment of Climate Change Impacts on the United States. He currently serves on the Scientific Steering Committee for the US Carbon Cycle Program and the Advisory Committee for Princeton University Carbon Mitigation Initiative. He has served as Editor of the Energy, Environment and National Resources area of the Operations Research Journal. He has also served on the Board of Editors of The Energy Journal and the Journal of Applied Stochastic Models and Data Analysis, and contributed to the Energy Modeling Forum.

Richels is a co-author of Buying Greenhouse Insurance - the Economic Costs of CO_{2} Emission Limits (with Alan S. Manne), and of Economic and environmental choices in the stabilization of atmospheric CO_{2} concentrations (with Tom Wigley and Jae Edmonds). Both studies outline an economic approach to climate policy. Richels is a researcher on integrated assessment modelling for climate change, and regularly appears in the media.
