= Stephen W. Pacala =

American academic

- Education: Dartmouth College; Stanford University
- Scientific career
- Fields: Ecology
- Workplaces: University of Connecticut; Princeton University

Stephen W. Pacala is the Frederick D. Petrie Professor in Ecology and Evolutionary Biology at Princeton University. He has worked on climate change, population ecology, and global interactions between the biosphere, atmosphere, and hydrosphere. Since 2021, he has been a member of the President’s Council of Advisors on Science and Technology (PCAST).

== Education ==
Pacala received his B.A. in Biology from Dartmouth College in 1978 and his Ph.D. in Biology from Stanford University in 1982.

== Career ==
He has taught at the University of Connecticut (1982-1992) and Princeton University (1992-Present). He also serves on the boards of the non-profits, Environmental Defense Fund and Climate Central. Pacala was elected as a member of the American Academy of Arts and Sciences in 2003. He was a lead author on the climate stabilization wedge project with Robert Socolow. Pacala was the Acting Director of the Princeton Environmental Institute from 2005 to 2006, and then served as its director from 2006 to 2014. He was elected to the National Academy of Sciences in 2007.

== Awards ==
Pacala received the Robert H. MacArthur Award from the Ecological Society of America in 2010. He became an inaugural Fellow of that society in 2012 and was appointed a Foreign Member of the Royal Society in 2025.
