= Robert H. Socolow =

American physicist (born 1937)

Robert Harry Socolow
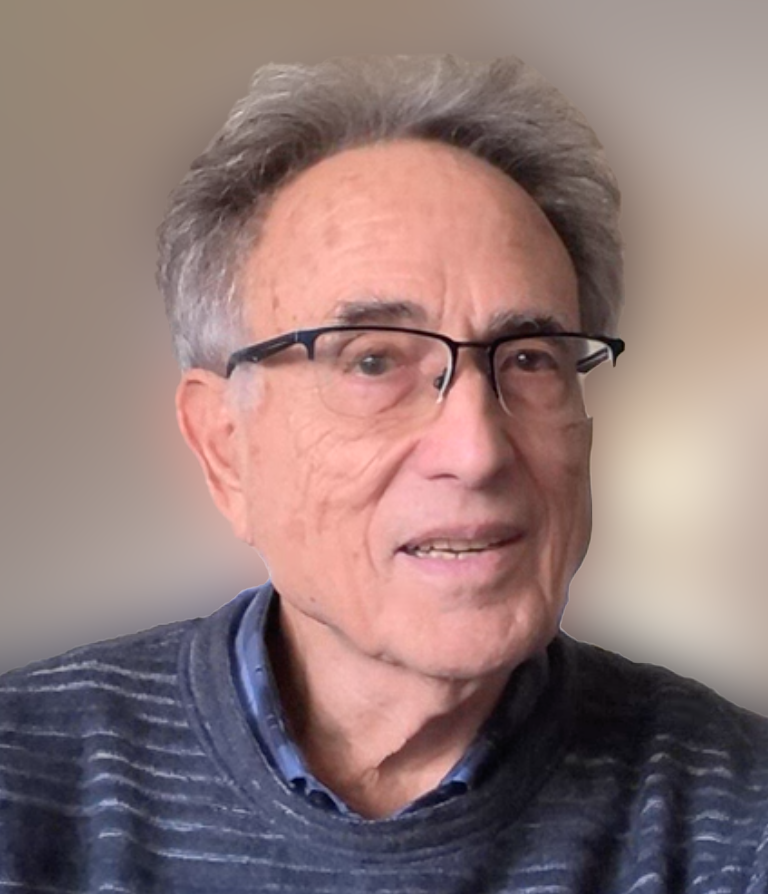
- Robert Socolow in March 2024
- Born: December 27, 1937 (age 88); New York City, U.S.
- Education: Harvard College (BA); Harvard University (PhD)
- Known for: Concept of the climate stabilization wedge
- Awards: John Scott Medal (2023); Leadership in the Environment Award (2010); Leo Szilard Lectureship Award (2003)
- Scientific career
- Fields: Physics; Environmental science Industrial ecology
- Workplaces: Princeton University
- Thesis: Electromagnetic Self-Energies and Weak Decays in Unitary Symmetry (1964)
- Doctoral advisors: Sidney Coleman
- Website: https://socolow.princeton.edu

Robert Harry Socolow (born December 27, 1937; surname pronunciation sŏc'-ŏ-lō) is an American environmental scientist, theoretical physicist and professor emeritus of Mechanical and Aerospace Engineering at Princeton University. He was a founder of the Carbon Mitigation Initiative of Princeton University. He has articulated pathways to reduction of carbon dioxide emissions for minimizing climate change, especially the concept of climate stabilization wedge. Socolow has developed equitable approaches to climate change mitigation that balance reductions in greenhouse gas emissions with economic development.

Socolow was a 2023 recipient of the John Scott Medal for his innovations in environmental science and climate stabilization. The award citation highlighted his ability to frame environmental problems in practical terms that aid in consensus-building.

The American Physical Society stated that Socolow had a leadership role in establishing energy and environmental problems as interdisciplinary research fields for physicists consistent with the highest scientific standards. In this regard, with ecologist John Harte, in 1971 Socolow authored Patient Earth which was an early casebook on environmental science. His research was characterized as pioneering in energy efficiency research in the context of environmentalism. Socolow's scientific investigations influenced the decision to cancel the Miami Jetport project and the Tocks Island Dam project in northern New Jersey. He articulated approaches to industrialization of the developing countries through environmentally responsible means.

== Early life and education ==
Socolow was born in 1937 in New York City to parents Abraham Walter Socolow and Edith Socolow (née Gutman). He attended the Ethical Culture Fieldston School. His father, A. Walter Socolow, was a founder of the Reconstructionist Rabbinical College of Pennsylvania and served as president of the Board of Jewish Education of Greater New York and also the Society for the Advancement of Judaism.

Socolow graduated summa cum laude in 1959 from Harvard College with a Bachelor of Arts degree in physics. Through a program at Harvard, he traveled for a year in Africa and Asia, having been awarded a Frederick Sheldon Travel Scholarship. Socolow then earned his Ph.D. in physics from Harvard University working on theoretical problems, finishing his doctorate in 1964. His doctoral thesis was on "Electromagnetic Self-Energies and Weak Decays in Unitary Symmetry" which was research conducted with Harvard professor Sidney Coleman. Between 1964 and 1966 he was National Science Foundation Postdoctoral Fellow in Physics, at the University of California at Berkeley and the European Center for Nuclear Research (CERN) in Geneva, Switzerland.

In 1962 Socolow married literary scholar Elizabeth Socolow (née Sussman).

Socolow's upbringing and early education emphasized arts, culture, and languages. He became multilingual, especially French and Russian. Socolow has stated his parents and teachers instilled in him with a sense of Weltschmerz (melancholy about the state of the world) and Tikkun Olam (relating to actions for the restoration of the world).

In 1957 during his undergraduate years, Socolow worked as a summer student at the Brookhaven National Laboratory. His time there exposed him to the rapid advances in the field of particle physics and convinced him to pursue an undergraduate degree in physics. Later, in 1961 when Socolow was in graduate school, he worked at the Pugwash Conferences on Science and World Affairs at which time he realized that scientific rigor is useful in developing public policy.

== Career ==
In 1966, Socolow joined the faculty at Yale University as an assistant professor of physics, where he remained until 1971. During the period shortly after completing his doctorate, Socolow continued his research in theoretical physics, collaborating with physicist Sheldon Glashow. They published jointly on aspects of mesons and other subatomic particles.

While at Yale, Socolow and other faculty members organized a "Day of Reflection" to discuss the role of scientists in the military and the Vietnam War, as part of the peace movement of the era. The event was held on March 4, 1969.

=== Environmental research ===
In 1969, through his antiwar activities, Socolow became acquainted with then Princeton physics professor Marvin Goldberger. Goldberger encouraged Socolow to participate in a summer case study program sponsored by the National Academy of Sciences at Stanford University on management of the environment. With fellow participant and Yale colleague John Harte, Socolow evaluated the environmental impact of the proposed Big Cypress Jetport in the Florida Everglades. They concluded that the impact on local water supplies was too large to justify continued construction of the airport. This study was influential in the decision to discontinue the project. As a result of this experience, Socolow redirected his scientific investigations and career endeavors to matters related to environmentalism, energy efficiency and sustainable development.

Shortly thereafter, Socolow and Harte published Patient Earth, which was an early casebook on environmental science.

Partly through the influence of Marvin Goldberger, in 1971 Socolow moved to Princeton University, with the rank of Associate Professor, serving in the Department of Aerospace and Mechanical Sciences, with the responsibility of organizing its newly created Center for Environmental Studies. An early endeavor at Princeton was the Twin Rivers Project, in which Socolow led a study that included several members of the Princeton faculty to evaluate the energy efficiency of individual homes at the Twin Rivers housing development in New Jersey. Twin Rivers was a middle class housing development in Mercer County. The study lasted seven years and evaluated energy usage in ordinary middle class homes and ways of improving the energy efficiency of individual homes. The project outcome was reported in a book Saving Energy in the Home: Princeton's Experiments at Twin Rivers, in which they showed that a 75% reduction in energy consumption was possible.

Beginning in 1972, Socolow led a study of the environmental impact of the Tocks Island Dam project, which was the proposed construction of a dam in the Delaware Water Gap between Pennsylvania and New Jersey. This was to be the largest dam constructed in the eastern portion of the United States. Socolow assembled a multi-disciplinary team to conduct the evaluation, and his team issued a report entitled Boundaries of Analysis: An Inquiry into the Tocks Island Dam Controversy. Ultimately political decision makers canceled the project.

A Guggenheim Fellowship and German Marshall Fund Fellowship from 1976 to 1977 enabled Socolow to study international energy issues at Cavendish Laboratory, University of Cambridge, U.K. In 1977 he became full professor and Associate Director of Princeton's Center for Energy and Environmental Studies. Socolow was also a faculty member in the Princeton University School of Engineering and Applied Science. During this time period, Socolow also taught frequently in the Woodrow Wilson School of Public and International Affairs.

Socolow continued at Princeton University, serving as director of the university's Center for Energy and Environment Studies from 1979 to 1997. During his tenure at the CEES, Socolow worked on initiatives that would enable economic advancements of the developing world that are environmentally responsible, approaches to environmentally improved means of delivering nitrogen fertilizer in agricultural settings, economically viable approaches to carbon sequestration for reduction of atmospheric carbon dioxide levels, and industrial ecology. He further contended that each generation has a moral and ethical obligation to leave successive generations with improved means for environmental stewardship.

Socolow worked with physicist Frank N. von Hippel and others on approaches to electricity generation through nuclear fission while rendering inaccessible the plutonium isotopes that could be used for fabrication of weapons. Socolow advocated nuclear power constrained in this way as an environmentally benign approach to electricity generation.

Princeton University president Robert F. Goheen had significant interest in matters related to energy and the environment, and he believed that Princeton could have a leadership role in such matters. To this end, he recruited Socolow to Princeton University, charging him with developing a multidisciplinary approach to energy and the environment. In 1971, Socolow moved to Princeton's newly-formed CEES and became a faculty member of the university's School of Engineering and Applied Science.

=== Carbon mitigation initiative ===
Beginning in 2000, Socolow collaborated with Princeton colleagues Robert H. Williams and Stephen W. Pacala to establish the carbon mitigation initiative (CMI). The goal of CMI was to address the problem of anthropogenic climate change through more effective management and reduction of atmospheric carbon dioxide emissions. CMI was established as a long term project, funded as of 2024 through 2025. The initiative was sponsored by BP with some initial participation by the Ford Motor Company.

Through their collaboration at CMI, Socolow and Pacala conceived of the idea of climate stabilization wedges. The intent was to devise manageable and realistic approaches to stabilize carbon dioxide emissions to the atmosphere at current levels for a duration of 50 years. The "stabilization triangle" is the area in the graph of carbon dioxide emissions versus time between projected future atmospheric emissions of carbon dioxide compared to constant emissions at current levels. Socolow and Pacal divided the stabilization triangle into triangular "wedges," each of which describes a specific amount of carbon dioxide emissions mitigation based on the application of a particular currently existing technology.

As first published, the climate stabilization wedges consisted of seven wedges which in combination would provide the needed carbon dioxide mitigation. These could be selected from existing technologies that include: Energy efficiency and conservation; Improved power generation; Carbon sequestration; Alternative energy sources; and Agriculture / Forestry. The wedges selected need not be the same for the Developing world and the Industrialized world. Socolow and Pacala first published the concept of climate stabilization wedges in the journal Science in 2004.

Emphasizing the implementation of existing technologies as a portfolio of options for carbon dioxide mitigation, Socolow and Pacala stated in the journal Scientific American:

"Holding carbon dioxide emissions constant for 50 years, without choking off economic growth, is within our grasp."

The book An Inconvenient Truth by former United States Vice President Al Gore referred to Socolow and Pacala (Note: An Inconvenient Truth refers to Socolow and Pacala as economists rather than environmental scientists.) and their work on climate stabilization wedges, emphasizing that the needed technology is already available to halt rise in atmospheric carbon dioxide levels.

=== Later career ===
In a 2009 scientific publication with ecologist G. David Tilman and others, Socolow cautioned against biofuels that are implemented poorly. Tilman and Socolow's scientific publication on the subject stated that biofuels should not compete with food crops or cause land-clearing and that they should offer overall greenhouse gas emissions as indicated by life cycle analysis.

In his on-going involvement with Princeton's Andinger Center for Energy and the Environment, Socolow led a group that wrote a series of environmentally-relevant monographs covering such topics as wind and solar power, grid power storage, small scale nuclear reactors, and nuclear fusion.

Socolow coined the term "destiny studies" in 2012 as a planetary-wide, interdisciplinary view of what Earth could look like. (Note: At times Socolow used the term destiny science, instead of destiny studies, emphasizing the role of scientists in visualizing long term environmental effects of human activity.) Following his 2013 retirement from his professorship, Socolow became an emeritus professor, while continuing his research at Princeton University. Destiny studies became an on-going endeavor at Princeton University and was the subject of a 2019 symposium conducted in honor of Socolow's retirement from full professorship.

Around the same time, Socolow articulated practical approaches to climate change mitigation based on an analysis of demand, supply and the relationship to international politics, as well as the role of populations growth. He acknowledged the uncertainty in the degree of urgency and that resistance is natural and to be expected. He discussed impediments resulting from factions that rarely communicate with one another, such as the nuclear power industry and the renewable fuels industry.

Regarding the impact of the developing world on climate change, Socolow stated that an equitable approach is through the concept of the personal carbon footprint, which emphasized emissions of carbon dioxide through activities of individuals rather than societies as a whole. The basis of this method of analysis is that affluent people in the developing world account for the majority of the carbon dioxide emissions within nations of the developing world even though they are a small portion of the population. Socolow first articulated the concept of the personal carbon footprint in a 2006 journal article of the Proceedings of the National Academy of Sciences co-authored by his colleague Pacala.

In a follow-up publication, Socolow and his co-authors elaborated on the responsibilities of "high emitters" who reside in developing nations.

Socolow pointed out the environmental impact of population growth and its role in population ecology.

In a scientific publication that refers to "witnessing for the middle", Socolow advocated for a middle ground that avoids overstating the case for drastic environmental actions while simultaneously preserving a sense of urgency among the public and policy makers. He contended that this middle ground minimizes polarization of climate change issues.

With colleague Chris Grieg, Socolow published an opinion piece in The Washington Post stating that there can be an important role for the fossil fuel industry while simultaneously reducing carbon dioxide emissions through carbon sequestration.

== Personal life ==
Socolow resides in Princeton, New Jersey, with his partner, Mimi Schwartz, a writer and scholar of creative non-fiction. He has two sons and was married three times. Elizabeth Anne (Sussman) Socolow is a published poet. The late Dr. Jane Reis Pitt, a physician-scientist, was a researcher on HIV pediatric infections at Columbia Presbyterian. Emily Matthews is an editor who worked for many years at the World Resources Institute.

Socolow and his siblings established the annual A. Walter Socolow Writing Prize to honor their deceased father.

== Awards and recognition ==
From 1992 to 2002 Socolow was an editor for Annual Review of Energy and the Environment. He served on two committees of the National Academies: America's Energy Future and America's Climate Choices and in 2004 became lifetime national associate of the National Academy of Sciences. He received the Leo Szilard Lectureship Award in 2003. The Szilard Lectureship Award citation stated about Socolow, "for leadership in establishing energy and environmental problems as legitimate research fields for physicists, and for demonstrating that these broadly defined problems can be addressed with the highest scientific standards".

Socolow is a fellow of the American Physical Society (elected in 1983) and of the American Association for the Advancement of Science.

Time (magazine) in 2007 recognized Socolow and Pacala's concept of climate stabilization wedges as a means of addressing some of Earth's most difficult problems. Then, in 2009, Time listed the "personal carbon footprint" as number 12 on the list of 50 best inventions of the year. Socolow and other Princeton colleagues were inventors on the personal carbon footprint concept.

Socolow and Pacala's publication in the journal Scientific American, "A Plan to Keep Carbon in Check", was one of 28 scientific articles included in the 2007 edition of the book The Best American Science and Nature Writing.

In 2010, Socolow received the Keystone Award for Leadership in the Environment from the Keystone Center of Colorado. He was a 2023 winner of the John Scott Medal for his career-long contributions for understanding and addressing anthropogenic climate change.

Socolow served on the Deutsche Bank Climate Change Advisory Board from 2008 to 2017 and on the U.S. Department of Energy Task Force on Carbon Dioxide Utilization. In 2014 Socolow became a member of the American Academy of Arts and Sciences.

Socolow was a long-time member of the board of directors of the National Audubon Society.

== Representative scholarly publications ==
These lists are non-exhaustive.

Books

- John Harte; Robert H Socolow. Patient earth. New York, Holt, Rinehart and Winston, 1971, 364 pages, ISBN 0030851033.
- Feiveson, Harold, Frank Sinden, and Robert Socolow. Boundaries of Analysis: an Inquiry Into the Tocks Island Dam Controversy. Cambridge, Mass.: Ballinger Publishing Company, 1976.
- OIES Global Change Institute & Socolow, R. H. (1994). Industrial ecology and global change. Cambridge University Press, ISBN 0521471974.

Journal articles

- S. Pacala, R. Socolow, Stabilization Wedges: Solving the Climate Problem for the Next 50 Years with Current Technologies. Science 305, pp. 968-972 (2004).
- Chakravarty, Shoibal, Ananth Chikkatur, Heleen De Coninck, Stephen Pacala, Robert Socolow, and Massimo Tavoni. "Sharing global CO2 emission reductions among one billion high emitters." Proceedings of the National Academy of Sciences 106, no. 29 (2009): 11884-11888.
- Robert H. Socolow, Truths We Must Tell Ourselves to Manage Climate Change, 65, Vanderbilt Law Review 1455 (2019).
- Robert H. Socolow, "Witnessing for the Middle to Depolarize the Climate Change Conversation," Dædalus 149 (4) (Fall 2020).

Reports

- R.H. Socolow, ed., 1997. Fuels Decarbonization and Carbon Sequestration: Report of a Workshop.
- R.H. Socolow et al., 2011. Direct Air Capture of CO2 with Chemicals.
