= Preben Maegaard =

Danish renewable energy pioneer (1935–2021)

- Born: 25 September 1935; Ærø, Denmark
- Died: 25 March 2021 (aged 85)
- Occupations: Founder and director emeritus of Nordic Folkecenter for Renewable Energy, renewable energy pioneer, author, expert
- Years active: 1974–2021

Preben Maegaard (25 September 1935 – 25 March 2021) was a Danish renewable energy pioneer, author and expert. From the oil crisis in 1974 he worked for the transition from fossil fuels to renewable energy. Maegaard was co-founder of the Nordic Folkecenter for Renewable Energy, established in 1983, and its director 1984 till 2013.

== Life and work ==
Maegaard worked locally, nationally and internationally at the organisational, political and technological levels within broad spectrum of renewable energy technologies.

From 1979 to 1984 Maegaard was chairman of the Danish Renewable Energy Association (OVE) from 1991, vice-president of Eurosolar (the European Renewable Energy Association) and in 2006, appointed senior vice-president. From 1992 he was co-ordinator of the European Solar Prize in Denmark and member of the European Solar Prize Jury. In 1995 he became Member of Senate, UTER, Technical University, Havana. In 1996 and the following years, Maegaard was member of the board of EUROSUN, an intergroup set up by the European Parliament. From 1999, he was a board member of the European Renewable Energies Federation (EREF) and Renewable Energy Adviser to the President of Mali, Alpha Konare, leading to the establishment of the Mali Folkecenter. In 2001, he became a chairperson of the Committee of the World Council for Renewable Energy (WCRE). When the World Wind Energy Association (WWEA) was founded in 2001, he became its first president, a position he held till 2005. In May 2006, the World Wind Energy Institute (WWEI) was initiated in Kingston, Canada, involving seven institutes from China, Brazil, Cuba, Canada, Russia, Egypt and Denmark. Maegaard was appointed the first president of the WWEI. He was co-founder of the SolarSuperState Association when it was founded in 2012 and became its first president.

As the director of the Folkecenter he was responsible for the technological innovation of windmills, including design, construction and implementation of sizes from 20 to 525 kW, farm biogas digesters from 50 to 1000 m3 as well as integrated energy systems including hydrogen and biofuels for transport. The technological development and implementation activities took place in cooperation with DS Trade and Industry. The Folkecenter under his leadership provided transfer of renewable energy technology to many countries, and set up numerous pilot projects worldwide. In 2002, the liberal government suspended the national renewable energy development and implementation activities and programs in which Maegaard held positions. Danish State support to the Folkecenter received from 1983 was suspended as well. From 2005, Folkecenter received funding from the Energifonden and from 2012 support from the Danish state.

Maegaard served on several Danish national governmental committees and councils for the development and implementation of renewable energy as member of:

- Renewable Energy Steering Group (1981–1991);
- National Board of Technology; National Renewable Energy Council in Denmark (1991–1996);
- National Committee Biomass for Energy (1985–1989);
- National Committee for Solar Energy (1995–2002);
- National Committee for Wave Power (1997–2002);
- National Committee for Hydrogen from Renewable for Transport Purposes (1998–2002).

For over three decades, Maegaard was conference director, organiser, speaker and/or participant of numerous national and international seminars, workshops and conferences, chairman of the World Wind Energy Conferences: WWEC2003 in Cape Town, WWEC2004 in Beijing and WWEC2005 in Melbourne. Maegaard was author and/or co-author of numerous reports, books, articles and periodicals in Danish, English, German and Japanese within the field of renewable energy and sustainable development and received a number of awards. In March 2010 Maegaard was featured in documentary film The Fourth Revolution: Energy.

Maegaard died on 25 March 2021, at the age of 85.

== Professional career ==
Education

- 1957–1962: Economist, graduated in Microeconomics, Human Resources and International Trade. Copenhagen School of Business and Economics.

Studies, Law and Ethnography, Copenhagen University.

- 1962–1965: Economist, Statistical Planning Bureau, Ministry of Housing

Early Career

- 1965–1970: Lecturer, Adult Education, Social Sciences and Human Ecology, Open University Courses and Danish Folk High Schools
- 1970–1975: Manager, NORDENFJORD College of Innovative Productions and Human Development
- 1975–1983: Consultant and Project Implementation Manager for Small and Medium Size Enterprises, Renewable Energy.

Project management | Organisation: Dansk Smedemesterforening (DS Trade & Industry)

- 1976–1982: Cooperation about development of construction manuals. 11, 22, 55 kW wind turbines for the Danish market. Marketing strategies. Association of 2000 members, 20 companies directly involved. Coordination, testing and approval.
- 1980–1982: Coordination of project group design engineering and product implementation. 100 kW wind turbine (Rudbjerg). Supported by Danish Agency of Industry.
- 1981–1985: Farm biogas, 50, 100, 200 cubic meter. Cooperation about development of construction manuals. Marketing strategies. Four companies directly involved. Coordination, testing and approval. Supported by Danish Agency of Industry

Founder and director | Organisation: Nordic Folkecenter for Renewable Energy

- 1984–1992: Development of construction manual. Wind turbine, 150, 200, 275 and 525 kW. Corporation development of manufacturing incl. subcontractors.
- 1987–1988: Large-scale solar collector for direct heating. Supported by Danish Agency of Industry.
- 1987–1989: Local island production and usage. Prototype development. Wind turbine project Bornholm, Denmark, 9 x 99 kW. Local production within the Baltic Power organization.
- 1988–1995: Concept development, technology research, project development, coordination and advising of Danish local cogeneration scheme. The target group was local consumer owned district heating associations. Appx. 200 installations with a grand total of 2.700 MW by 1995.
- 1990–1992: Organization of local production of wind power in Poland. Local production organization, building and testing. 95 kW. Supported by Danish Agency of Industry
- 1991–1994: Technology transfer of Hydrogen-electrolyze system from Ukraine to Denmark.
- 1992: Solar technology, Hungary. Technology transfer. Partly local production. Training of local staff.
- 1992–1993: University of Pernambuco, Recife, Brazil. Transfer and installation of FC type 75 kW wind turbine for island wind-diesel operation. Supported by Danish Agency of Industry
- 1996–1997: 600 kW wind turbine project in Kaliningrad. Supported by Danish Environmental Protection Agency.
- 1997–1999: 10 kW wind turbine tech to Bayamo, Cuba, Technical University in Havana. Technology transfer, erection and testing. Local production.
- 1998: Home power, Transylvania, Rumania, 3 kW wind turbine and solar cell system. Remote area, stand alone system. Supported by European Commission.
- 1998: Biogas plant, Kaunas, Lithuania, Development, production, installation and commissioning using local producers. Supported by Danish Environmental Protection Agency.
- 1998–2002: Advisor to the President of Mali, Alpha Konaré. Implementation of village electrification in the Sikasso region. Building and operation of RE training center in Tabaccoro, Mali. Supported by Danida
- 1990–1995: Information and marketing of renewable energy and technology transfer of Danish know-how. Mobile exhibition campaigns and information to eight East European countries. Committee member in Danish board technology.
- 2001: Biogas plant, Yubetsu, Japan, Development, production in Denmark. Installation and commissioning using local assistance. Coordination for Kawasaki Engineering.
- 2009–main speaker at an event organised in Uganda to discuss solar energy organised by Joint Energy Environment Projects (JEEP). (As at July 2024, the Nordic Folkecenter is a partner and funder of JEEP)

== Awards ==
- 1978, Solar Prize, Danish Organisation for Renewable Energy (OVE)
- 1985, Plum Environmental Prize, Plum Fonden
- 1987, Environmental Prize, Association of Danish Engineers
- 1992, Wind Energy Prize, Denmark's Windmill Owners Association
- 1997, European Solar Prize, EUROSOLAR
- 2002, The GAIA Prize, Gaia Trust
- 2002, MERKUR Pioneer Prize, MERKUR cooperative Bank
- 2005, Nuclear-Free Future Award
- 2008, World Wind Energy Award, World Wind Energy Association
- 2010, CommunityPower Award, Toronto, Canada

== Later publications ==
- Beuse, E.; Boldt, J.; Maegaard, P.; Meyer, N.I.; Windeleff, J.; Ostergaard, I. (2000) Vedvarende energi i Danmark. En krønike om 25 opvækstår 1975 – 2000, OVE's Forlag; Aarhus
- Maegaard, P.; Kruse, J. (2001) Energien fra Thy. Fra de lokale til det globale, Nordvestjysk Folkecenter for Vedvarende Energi; Hurup Thy
- Maegaard, P. (2003) Wind Energy for the Future, Keynote paper prepared for the 13th Islamic Academy of Science, IAS, Conference; Kuching, Malaysia
- El Bassam, N.; Maegaard, P. (2004) Integrated Renewable Energy for Rural Communities, ELSEVIER; Amsterdam and London.
- Maegaard, P. (2004) Die Kraft der Sonne in den Dienst der Menschheit stellen. In Hermann Scheer. Praktische Visionen, Ponte Press; Bochum
- Maegaard, P. (2004) Laudatio for Dr. Hermann Scheer, The WORLD WIND ENERGY AWARD, WWEC2004; Beijing
- E Thybo Andersen, Finn; Maegaard, Preben: (2006) Byvandringer 1968 ¤ Bykulturen ved vejs ende, YNKB TEMA 12; København, ISSN 1602-2815
- Maegaard, P., (2010) "Wind Energy Development and Application Prospects, of Non-Grid-Connected Wind Power," in: Proceedings of 2009 World Non-Grid-Connected Wind, Power and Energy Conference. IEEE Press.
- Maegaard, P.: (2012) "Integrated Systems to Reduce Global Warming" in "Handbook of Climate Mitigation", Vol IV, Springer Science, New York,
- El Bassam, N., Maegaard, P., Schlichting, M.L., (2013) "Distributed Renewable Energies for Off-Grid Communities," Elsevier Science, New York
- Maegaard, P., Palz, W., Krenz, A.: (2013) "Wind Power for the World, The Rise of Modern Wind Energy", Vol 2, Part I, Pan Stanford, Singapore
- Maegaard, P., Palz, W., Krenz, A.: (2013) "Wind Power for the World, International Reviews and Developments", Vol 2, Part II, Pan Stanford, Singapore
