= Bent Sørensen =

Bent Sørensen may refer to:

- Bent Sørensen (composer) (born 1958), Danish composer
- Bent Sørensen (footballer) (1926–2011), Danish footballer
- Bent Sørensen (physicist) (born 1941), Danish physicist
