= Energy Watch Group =

- Abbreviation: EWG
- Formation: 2006 (20 years ago)
- Type: Independent think tank comprising network of scientists and parliamentarians
- Location: Berlin, Germany
- Official language: German, English
- President: Hans-Josef Fell
- Key people: Werner Zittel; Christian Breyer; Claudia Kemfert
- Website: www.energywatchgroup.org

The Energy Watch Group (EWG) is an international network of scientists and parliamentarians. The EWG conducts research and publishes studies on global energy developments concerning both fossil fuels and renewables. The organization states that it seeks to provide energy policy with objective information.

The EWG was founded in 2006 by the former German parliamentarian and Order of Merit of the Federal Republic of Germany recipient Hans-Josef Fell and further parliamentarians from other countries to provide both experts and political decision makers as well as the public with information on energy issues. In 2023, the Energy Watch Group transitioned into a non-profit legal entity, now known as EWG Energy Watch UG.

== Research areas ==
The EWG conducts research on energy issues, including natural gas, crude oil, coal, renewables and uranium. In particular, they focus on three interrelated topics:

- the shortage of fossil and atomic energy resources,
- development scenarios for regenerative energy sources as well as
- strategies deriving from these for a long-term secure energy supply at affordable prices

The EWG studies examines ecological, technological and economic connections in the energy sector to estimate developments in the availability and supply of different energy sources and production techniques. The results of the EWG studies are to be presented not only to experts but also to the politically interested public. All EWG studies are open access and are available on the website.

Next to topics covering the energy transition towards a system based on 100% renewable energy, the EWG is also monitoring and regularly informing about the latest developments in the global divestment movement on their website.

== Research and statements ==
Studies of the EWG by and large come to the conclusion that the planet will run out of fossil fuels earlier than previously thought. The global supply of fossil fuels is therefore extremely strained. An early study of the EWG estimates that there is far less coal available than what is commonly expected. Moreover, coal is distributed very unevenly across countries. 85% of global coal reserves are situated in six countries: USA, Russia, India, China and South Africa. The report suggests that a global peak of coal production will occur in 2025 the latest. The situation for crude oil is even more critical. Global oil production is said to collapse to 40% in 2030 compared to production in 2012. According to calculations by the EWG, peak-oil has already been reached in 2006 with a global oil production maximum of 81 million barrels per day and is now on a steep decline.

The EWG further maintains that neither new production techniques such as fracking, nor nuclear power nor a diversification of the fossil fuel portfolio can reverse the trend of a collapsing conventional energy system. A recent EWG report warns that fracking not only has catastrophic consequences for the environmental and detrimental health impacts, but is also economically unviable, particularly in Europe. The US is heading straight to a peak in shale gas extraction after which production will plummet within this decade. Another study claims that a diversification of natural gas imports to decrease the EU's dependence on Russia is not an option. Neither Russia nor any other producer of natural gas can be a reliable energy supplier for the European Union. As Russian gas supply is declining, there is increasing demand in other countries, including China and Japan, competing for gas resources. Moreover, liquid natural gas (LNG) cannot contribute to security of supply. Although the EU has the capacity to import 200 billion m^{3}/year, it only imported 45 billion m^{3}/year. According to the EWG, this is a clear indication that the producing countries lack export capacities. Substitution of declining fossil fuel reserves with nuclear energy is also doomed to fail due to two factors. First, with the proven reserves, the stocks will be exhausted in 30 years if demand remains constant. Second, as only 3–4 reactors per year are currently being completed, the competition of 15-20 would be required to maintain present reactor capacity.

Several other studies argue that a global shortage of fossil energy supply can only be intercepted by a rigorous extension of the renewable energy system. The potential for this endeavour is greater than previously thought, according to the EWG. An EWG study posits that such arguments against wind power as fluctuations of wind, lack of grid connections and lack of reserve capacities do not hold due to improvements in planning, growing price incentives and technical improvements. In 2008, the EWG estimated that 17–29% of global energy demand can be covered by renewable energy depending on the willingness to invest. The report maintains that political will is the most crucial obstacle to a global energy transition.

In 2016/17, the main focus of EWG's studies based on model based approaches concerning how a transformation towards a 100% RE system can be achieved sustainably, e.g. for India, Iran and Nigeria. Also storage technologies are an important factor of a successful energy transition, thus this topic is covered in a paper about the transition of the energy system in Ukraine.

A collaborative study with the Lappeenranta University of Technology is currently in progress (April 2017). It will tackle the question how a global solution towards an energy system based on 100% renewables can be achieved in a feasible and low cost way and across four major sectors: electricity, heating, industrial demand and transport.

== Controversy and debates ==
Several statements made by the EWG are in stark contrast with those of the International Energy Agency (IEA) and other organizations in the field. The EWG even claims that the IEA is institutionally biased towards conventional energy sources and follows a 'hidden agenda' to keep up the belief of an abundant supply of fossil energy sources while downplaying the potential for renewable energy and publishing misleading data.

In 2013, the EWG predicted world natural gas production would peak in 2020.

The Energy Watch Group criticism of the IEA credibility has attracted a lot of attention in the international media. The EWG achieved a partial victory when the IEA confirmed the EWG's warnings of a shrinking global supply of fossil fuels in 2010.

Since then, the EWG has published a series of studies examining what it calls the biased and misleading scenarios of the IEA, including the study on the World Energy Outlook Reports from 1994 to 2004. the analysis of the/ IEA's Medium Term Renewable Energy Market Report 2016, and the analysis of the World Energy Outlook 2015 and the World Energy Outlook 2016. The EWG findings were also revisited by specialist media.

The Energy Watch Group has also criticized the German government in recent years for their controversial policies in regard to climate change and Energiewende. The targets set by the German Federal Government are insufficient to meet the climate targets of the international Paris Agreement and also slow down the installation of renewable energy sources, according to EWG.

== EWG studies ==
Forthcoming

- Energy Watch Group & Lappeenranta University of Technology (2016/ 2017) Global Energy System Based on 100% Renewables – A Feasible and Low Cost Solution for Electricity, Heat, Mobility and Industrial Demand
  - Prof. Herres, Potential global biofuel production and its implications on CO2 in air, water and soil, Presentation (part of the Study on 100% RE)

2017

- Child, M., Breyer, Ch., Bogdanov, D., Fell, H.J. (2017) The role of storage technologies for the transition to a 100% renewable energy system in Ukraine. 11th International Renewable Energy Storage Conference, Düsseldorf
- Fell, H.J. (01.2017) Energy Sector in Ukraine: Challenges and Chances. (Policy brief)
- EWG Press Release, 17 March 2017: India, Iran and Nigeria Can Switch To 100% Renewable Electricity by 2050

2016

- EWG Analysis of the World Energy Outlook (30 November 2016): The International Energy Agency undermines global climate protection and energy security in its latest World Energy Outlook
  - EWG Pressemitteilung, 30 November 2016: Die Internationale Energieagentur schadet erneut dem Klimaschutz und der globalen Energiesicherheit mit dem jüngsten World Energy Outlook
- EWG Analysis of the IEA's Medium-Term Renewable Energy Market Report 2016 (27 October 2016): International Energy Agency's Renewables Forecast: Old Wine in New Bottles
  - EWG Pressemitteilung, 28 October 2016: IEAs Erneuerbare Energien Projektionen: Alter Wein in neuen Schläuchen
- Schwarz, J., Fell, H.J. (2016) Deutsche Klimapolitik – vom Vorreiter zum Bremser. Energy Watch Group & ASPO Deutschland, Berlin.
- Breyer, Ch., Fell, H.J., Gulagi, A. (2016) Sustainable and Low-Cost Energy System for India without Nuclear and Coal Base Load. Energy Watch Group, Berlin

2015

- Breyer, Ch., Fell, H.J. Zittel, W. (2015) IEA creates misleading future scenarios for solar power generation . Energy Watch Group, Berlin
- Breyer, Ch., Fell, H.J. Zittel, W. (2015) Energy Watch Group calls on the IEA to release realistic scenarios. Energy Watch Group, Berlin
- Breyer, Ch., Fell, H.J. Zittel, W. (2015) IEA Keeps Assuming Linear Growth for Renewable Energy. Energy Watch Group, Berlin
- Breyer, Ch., Fell, H.J., Metayer, M. (2015) The projections for the future and quality in the past of the World Energy Outlook for solar PV and other renewable energy technologies. Energy Watch Group (Berlin) and Lappeenranta University of Technology (Finland).
- Zittel, W. (2015) Fracking – Eine Zwischenbilanz. Energy Watch Group, Berlin (english executive summary)

2014

- Zittel, W. (2014) The EU's dependency on Russia for natural gas can only be reversed with a rapid expansion of renewable energy sources . Energy Watch Group, Berlin

2013

- Zittel, W., Zerhusen, J., Zerta, M. (2013) Fossil and Nuclear Fuels – the Supply Outlook. Energy Watch Group, Berlin

2010

- Zittel, W. (2010) Worldwide Estimated Yearly Energy Costs. Energy Watch Group, Berlin

2009

- Rechsteiner, R. (2009) Wind Power in Context – A Clean Revolution in the Energy Sector. Energy Watch Group, Berlin

2008

- Schindler, J., Zittel, W. (2008) Crude Oil – The Supply Outlook. Energy Watch Group, Berlin
- Peter, S., Lehmann, H. (2008) Renewable Energy Outlook 2030: Energy Watch Group Global Renewable Energy Scenarios . Energy Watch Group, Berlin

2007

- Schindler, J., Zittel, W. (2007) Coal: Resources and Future Production. Energy Watch Group, Berlin

2006

- Zittel, W., Schindler, J.(2006) Uranium Resources and Nuclear Energy. Energy Watch Group, Berlin
