= 100% renewable energy =

Exclusively using renewable resources for all energy

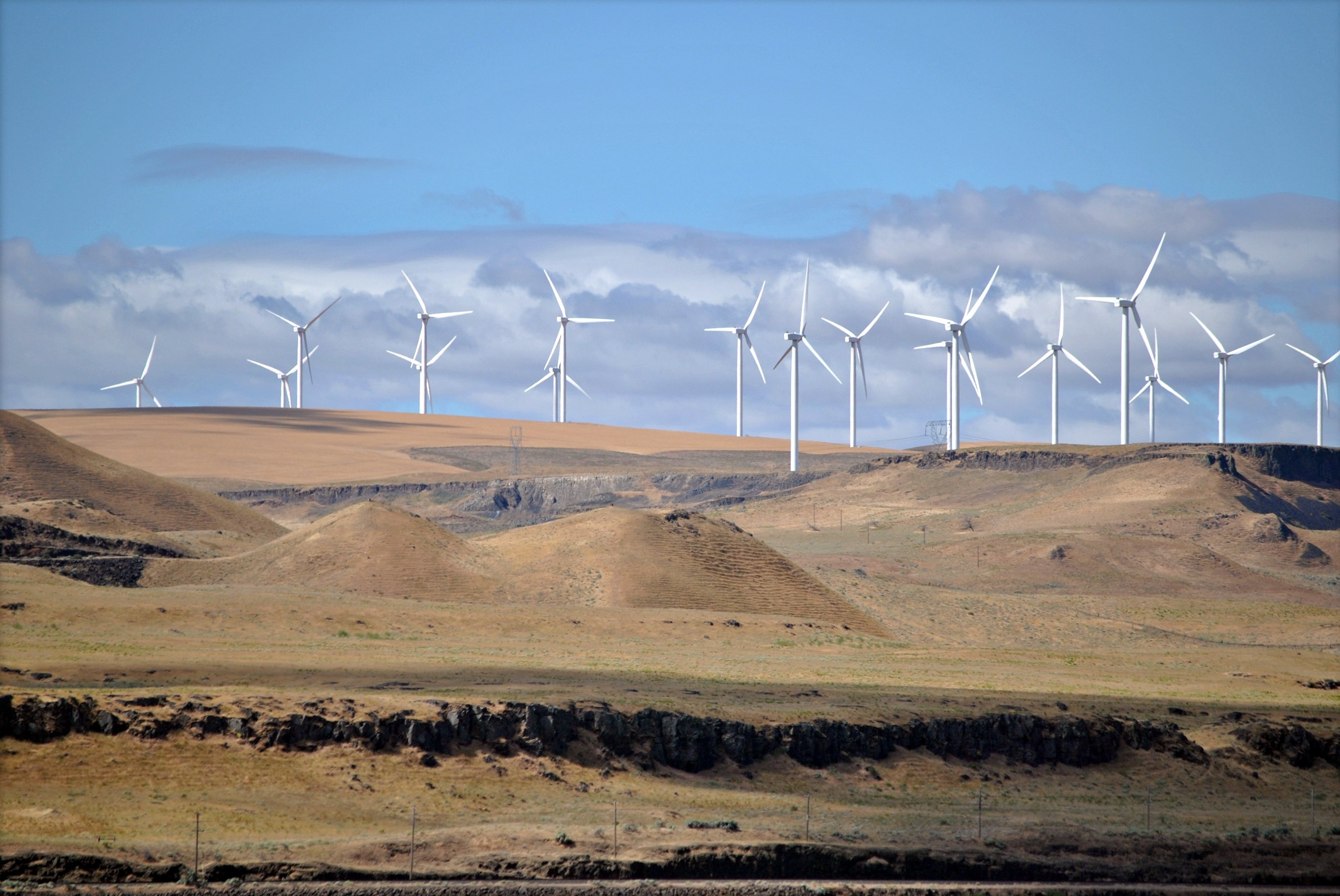
The Shepherds Flat Wind Farm is an 845 megawatt (MW) wind farm in the U.S. state of Oregon.

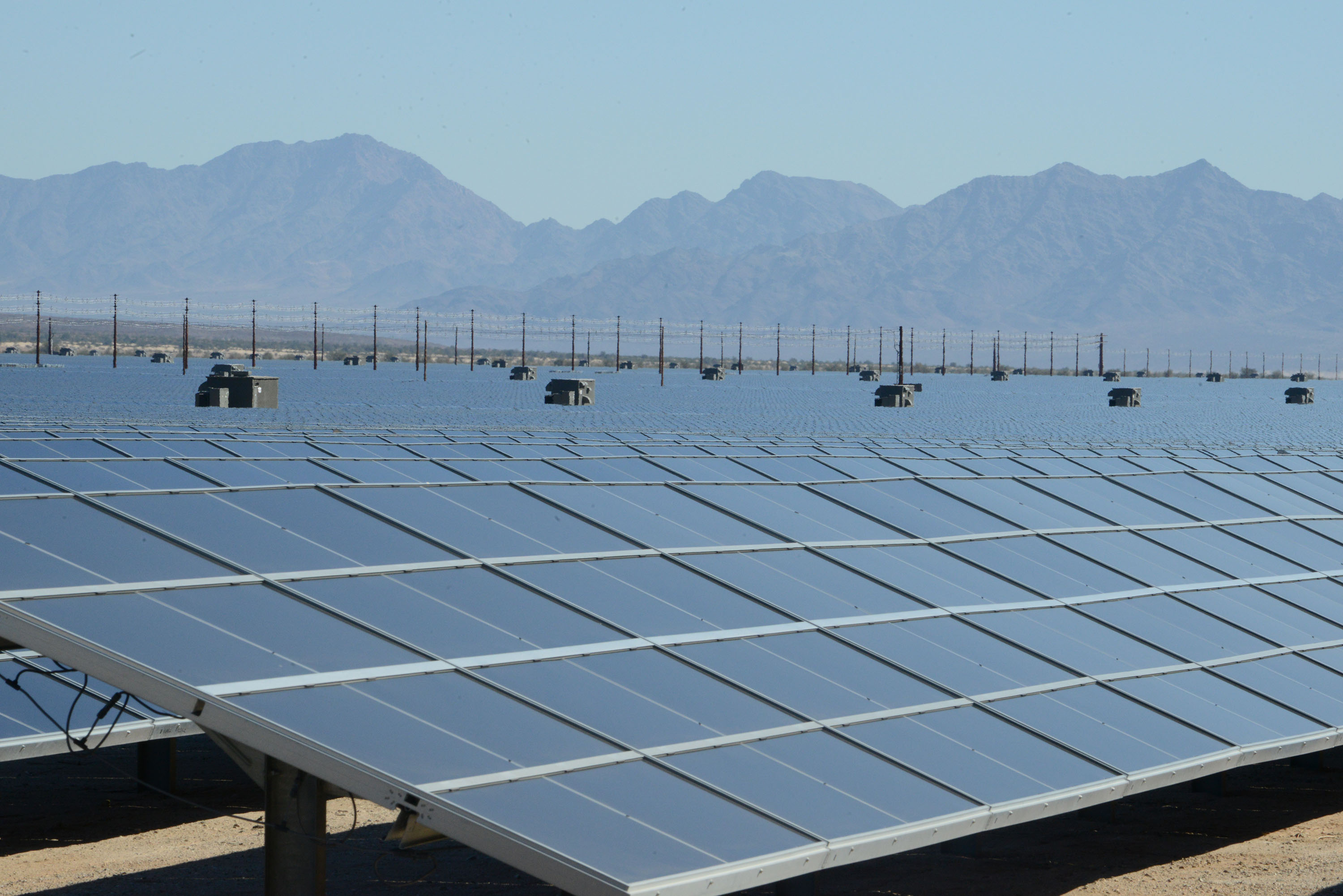
The 550 MW Desert Sunlight Solar Farm in California

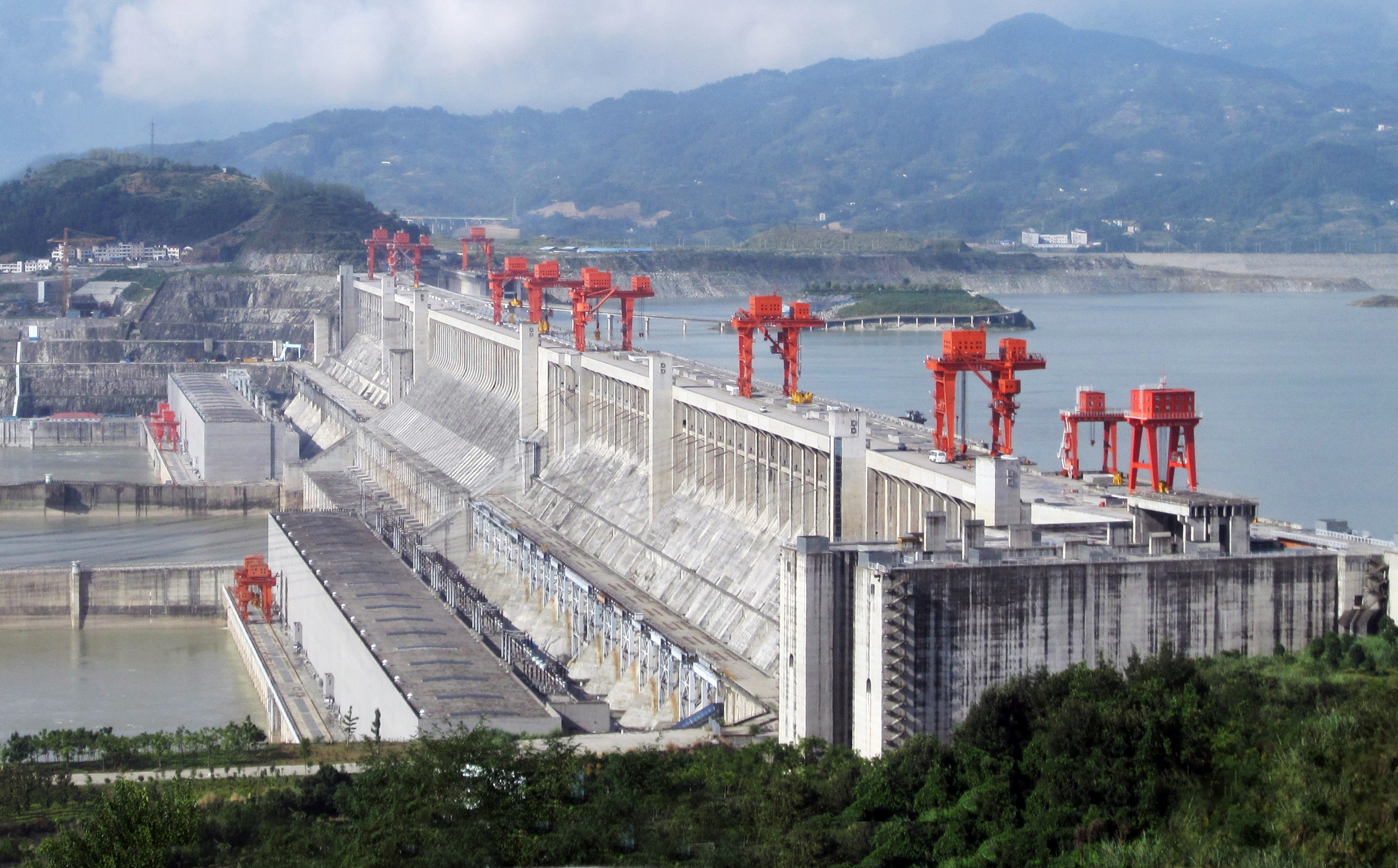
The Three Gorges Dam on the Yangtze River, China

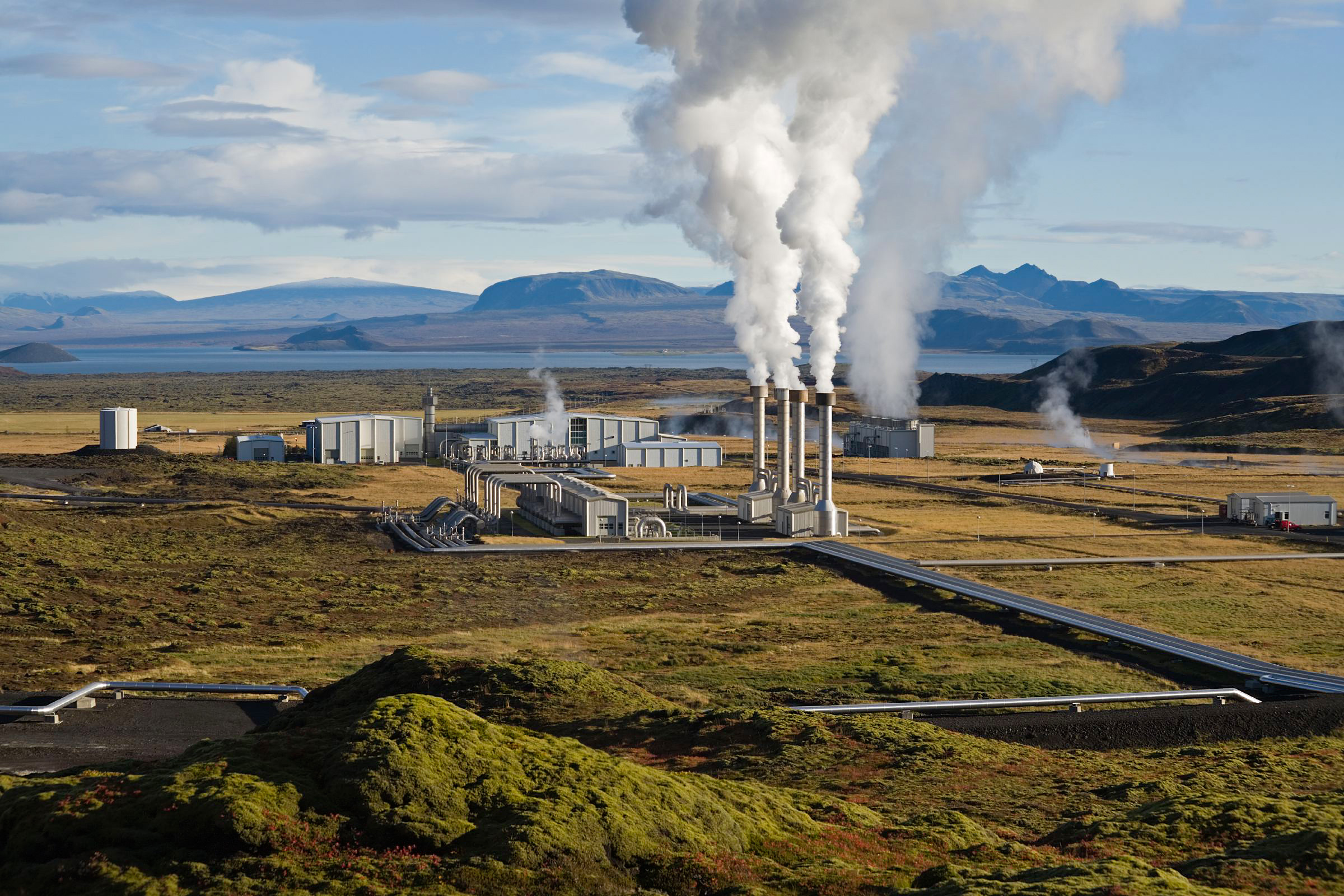
The Nesjavellir Geothermal Power Plant in Þingvellir, Iceland

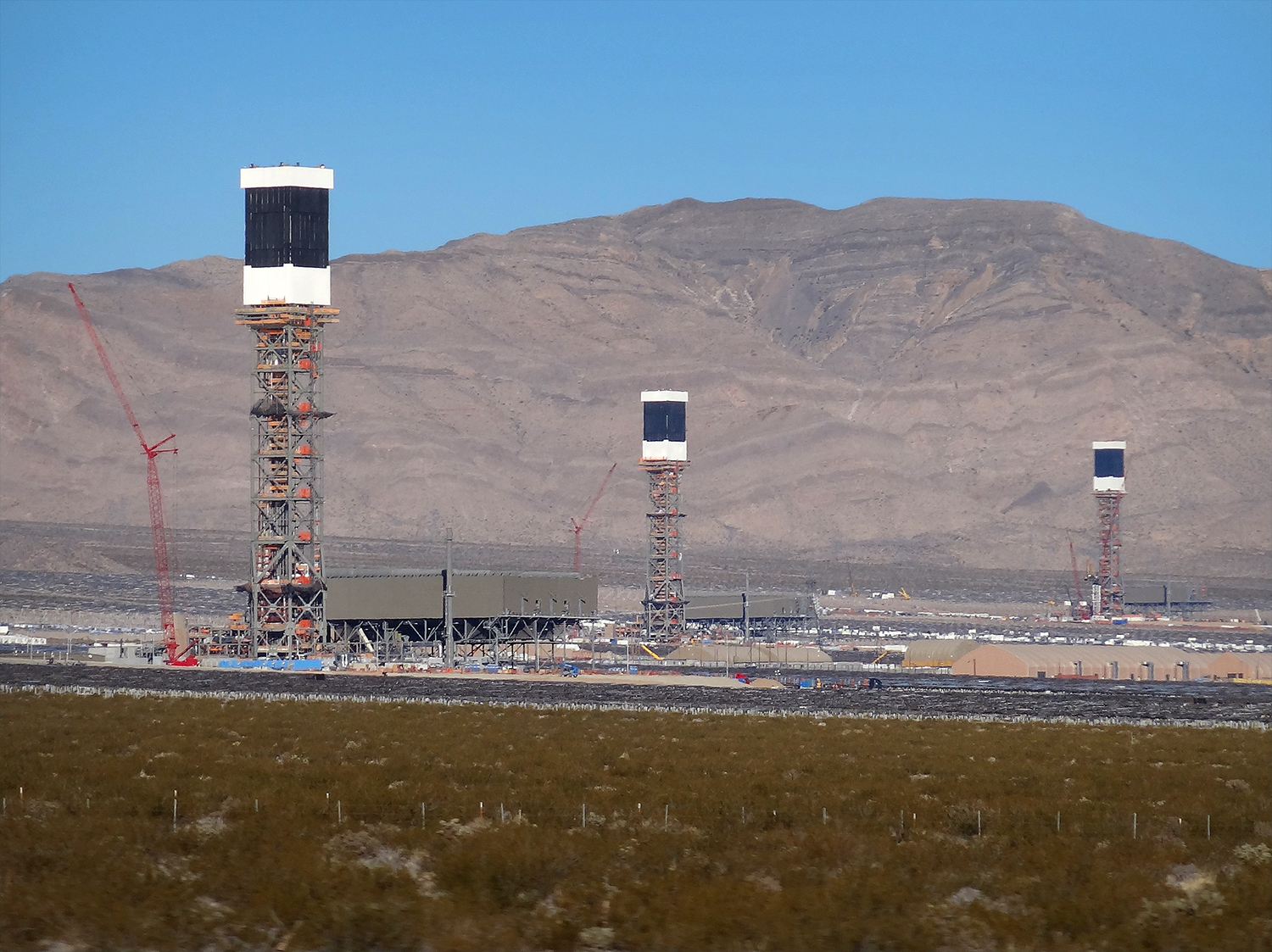
The 392 MW Ivanpah Solar Power Facility in California: The facility's three towers.

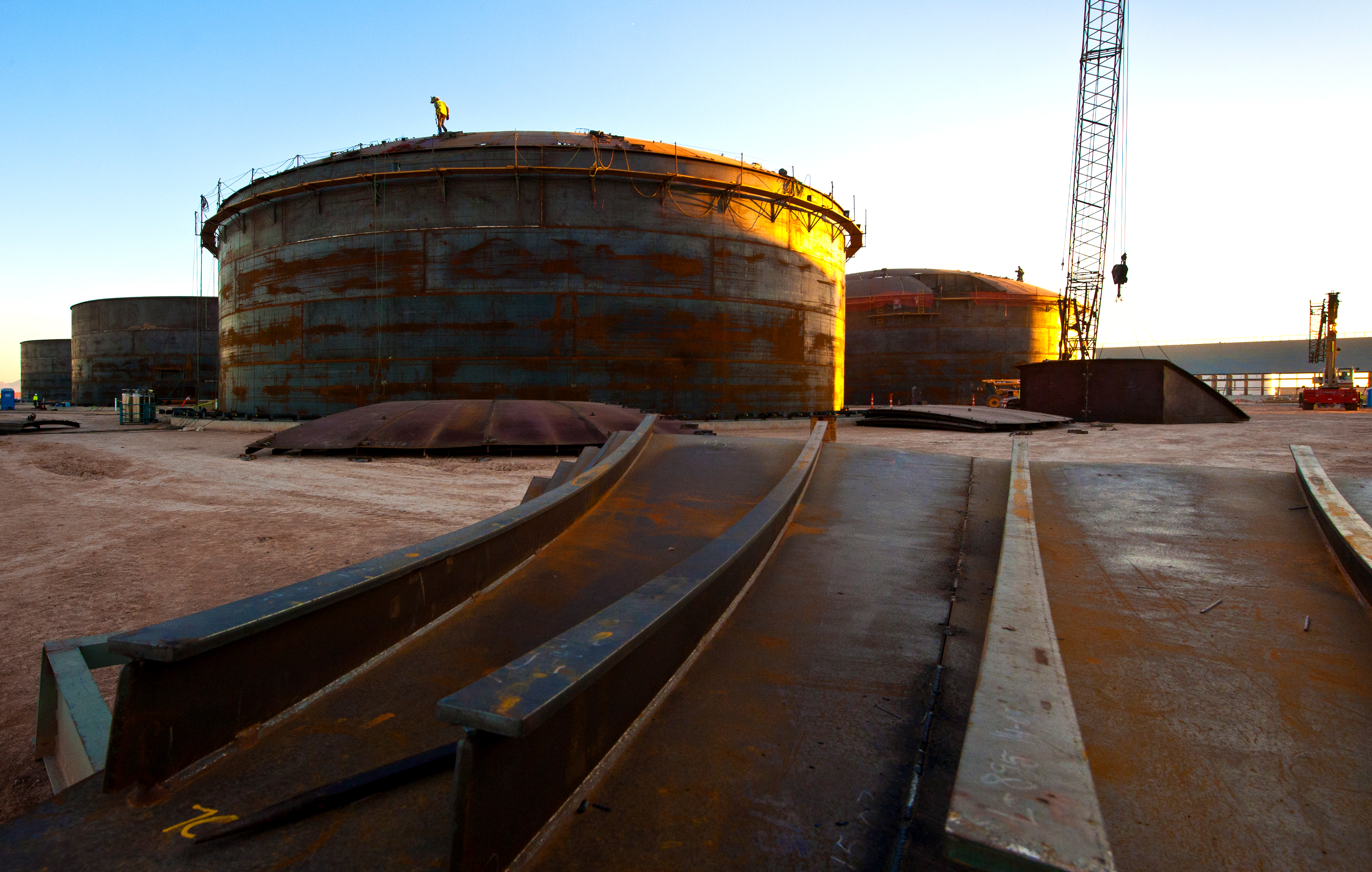
Construction of the Salt Tanks, which provide efficient thermal energy storage so that output can be provided after the sun goes down, and output can be scheduled to meet demand requirements. The 280 MW Solana Generating Station is designed to provide six hours of energy storage. This allows the plant to generate about 38 percent of its rated capacity over the course of a year.

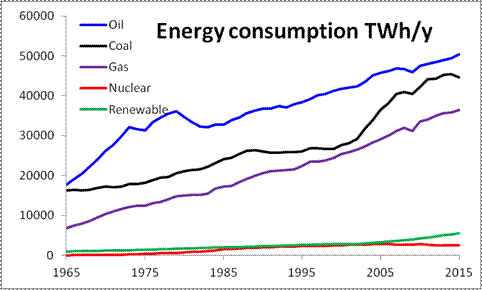
Comparing trends in worldwide energy use. The growth of renewable energy to 2015 is the green line.

100% renewable energy is the goal of using fully renewable resources for all electric energy consumption. 100% renewable energy for electricity, heating, cooling and transport is motivated by greenhouse gas emissions, pollution, and other environmental issues, as well as economic and energy security concerns. Shifting the total global primary energy supply to renewable sources requires a transition of the energy system, since most of today's energy is derived from non-renewable fossil fuels.

Research into this topic is fairly new, with few studies published before 2009, but has gained increasing attention in recent years. A cross-sectoral, holistic approach is seen as an important feature of 100% renewable energy systems and is based on the assumption "that the best solutions can be found only if one focuses on the synergies between the sectors" of the energy system such as electricity, heat, transport or industry.

== Feasibility ==
No uniform definition for 100% renewable energy systems has been adopted across the published literature.

Recent studies show that a global transition to 100% renewable energy across all sectors – power, heat, transport and desalination well before 2050 is feasible. According to a review of the 181 peer-reviewed papers on 100% renewable energy that were published until 2018, "[t]he great majority of all publications highlights the technical feasibility and economic viability of 100% RE systems." A review of 97 papers published since 2004 and focusing on islands concluded that across the studies 100% renewable energy was found to be "technically feasible and economically viable." A 2022 review found that the main conclusion of most of the literature in the field is that 100% renewables is feasible worldwide at low cost.

Existing technologies, including storage, are capable of generating a secure energy supply at every hour throughout the year. The sustainable energy system is more efficient and cost effective than the existing system. The United Nations Intergovernmental Panel on Climate Change (IPCC) stated in their 2011 report that there is little that limits integrating renewable technologies for satisfying the total global energy demand.

Mark Z. Jacobson, professor of civil and environmental engineering at Stanford University and director of its Atmosphere and Energy program, says that producing all new energy with wind power, solar power, and hydropower by 2030 is feasible, and that existing energy supply arrangements could be replaced by 2050. Barriers to implementing the renewable energy plan are seen to be "primarily social and political, not technological or economic". Jacobson says that energy costs today with a wind, solar, and water system should be similar to today's energy costs from other optimally cost-effective strategies. The main obstacle against this scenario is the lack of political will. His conclusions have been disputed by other researchers. Jacobson published a response that disputed the piece point by point and claimed that the authors were motivated by allegiance to energy technologies that the 2015 paper excluded.

Jacobson says that energy costs today with a wind, solar, and water system should be similar to today's energy costs from other optimally cost-effective strategies and he has rebutted their criticisms. A followup paper was published by Jacobson and others in 2022, in which paths to 100% renewable energy by 2035 and 2050 were developed for 145 countries. The study concluded that a wind-water-solar (WWS) based system "requires less energy, costs less, and creates more jobs than business as usual". The cost reduction was primarily due to the substantial (-56.4%) decrease in overall energy demand thanks to the increased efficiency of relying on renewable electricity for all energy needs.

In 2014, renewable sources such as wind, geothermal, solar, biomass, and burnt waste provided 19% of the total energy consumed worldwide, with roughly half of that coming from traditional use of biomass. The largest sector in terms of energy consumption is electricity with a renewable share of 22.8%, most of it coming from hydropower with a share of 16.6%, followed by wind with 3.1%. As of 2018, according to REN21, transformation is picking up speed in the power sector, but urgent action is required in heating, cooling and transport.

There are many places around the world with grids that are run almost exclusively on renewable energy. At the national level, at least 30 nations already have renewable energy contributing more than 20% of the energy supply. Renewable energy use has grown more quickly than even advocates anticipated. As of 2019, however, it needs to grow six times faster to limit global warming to 2 °C (3.6 °F).

=== Energy transition ===
100% renewable energy is an energy system where all energy use is sourced from renewable energy sources. The endeavor to use 100% renewable energy for electricity, heating/cooling and transport is motivated by global warming, pollution and other environmental issues, as well as economic and energy security concerns. Shifting the total global primary energy supply to renewable sources requires a transition of the energy system, since most of today's energy is derived from non-renewable fossil fuels.

According to the Intergovernmental Panel on Climate Change there are few fundamental technological limits to integrating a portfolio of renewable energy technologies to meet most of total global energy demand. Renewable energy use has grown more quickly than even advocates anticipated. As of 2019, however, it needs to grow six times faster to limit global warming to 2 °C (3.6 °F).

100% renewable energy in a country is typically a more challenging goal than carbon neutrality. The latter is a climate mitigation target, politically decided by many countries, and may also be achieved by balancing the total carbon footprint of the country (not only emissions from energy and fuel) with carbon dioxide removal and carbon projects abroad.

As of 2018 according to REN21 transformation is picking up speed in the power sector, but urgent action is required in heating, cooling and transport. There are many places around the world with grids that are run almost exclusively on renewable energy. At the national level, at least 30 nations already have renewable energy contributing more than 20% of the energy supply.

According to a review of the 181 peer-reviewed papers on 100% renewable energy published until 2018, "[t]he great majority of all publications highlights the technical feasibility and economic viability of 100% RE systems." While there are still many publications that focus on electricity only, there is a growing number of papers that cover different energy sectors and sector-coupled, integrated energy systems. This cross-sectoral, holistic approach is seen as an important feature of 100% renewable energy systems and is based on the assumption "that the best solutions can be found only if one focuses on the synergies between the sectors" of the energy system such as electricity, heat, transport or industry.

Stephen W. Pacala and Robert H. Socolow of Princeton University have developed a series of "climate stabilization wedges" that can allow us to maintain our quality of life while avoiding catastrophic climate change, and "renewable energy sources", in aggregate, constitute the largest number of their "wedges".

Similarly, in the United States, the independent National Research Council has noted that "sufficient domestic renewable resources exist to allow renewable electricity to play a significant role in future electricity generation and thus help confront issues related to climate change, energy security, and the escalation of energy costs ... Renewable energy is an attractive option because renewable resources available in the United States, taken collectively, can supply significantly greater amounts of electricity than the total current or projected domestic demand."

The main barriers to the widespread implementation of large-scale renewable energy and low-carbon energy strategies are political rather than technological. According to the 2013 Post Carbon Pathways report, which reviewed many international studies, the key roadblocks are: climate change denial, the fossil fuels lobby, political inaction, unsustainable energy consumption, outdated energy infrastructure, and financial constraints.

Studies have shown that Southeast Asia countries could achieve almost 100% renewable elecitricity based on solar, wind, and off-river pumped hydro energy storage at a competitive LCOE of around US$55–115/MWh.

== History ==
Using 100% renewable energy was first suggested in a paper in Science published in 1975 by Danish physicist Bent Sørensen, which was followed by several other proposals. In 1976, energy policy analyst Amory Lovins coined the term "soft energy path" to describe an alternative future where energy efficiency and appropriate renewable energy sources steadily replace a centralized energy system based on fossil and nuclear fuels.

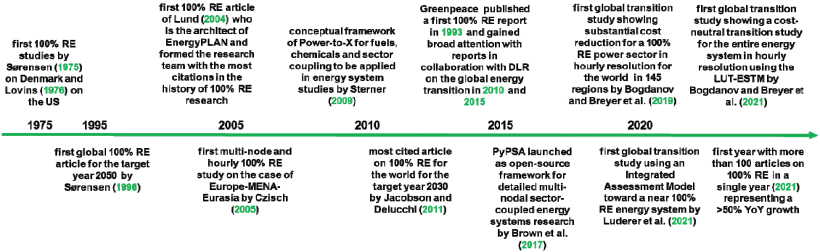
Timeline of selected key milestones of 100% renewable energy systems research

In 1998, the first detailed analysis of scenarios with high shares of renewables were published. These were followed by the first detailed 100% scenarios. In 2006, a PhD thesis was published by Czisch in which it was shown that in a 100% renewable scenario energy supply could match demand in every hour of the year in Europe and North Africa. In the same year, Danish Energy professor Henrik Lund published a first paper in which he addresses the optimal combination of renewables, which was followed by several other papers on the transition to 100% renewable energy in Denmark. Since then, Lund has been publishing several papers on 100% renewable energy. After 2009, publications began to rise steeply, covering 100% scenarios for countries in Europe, America, Australia and other parts of the world.

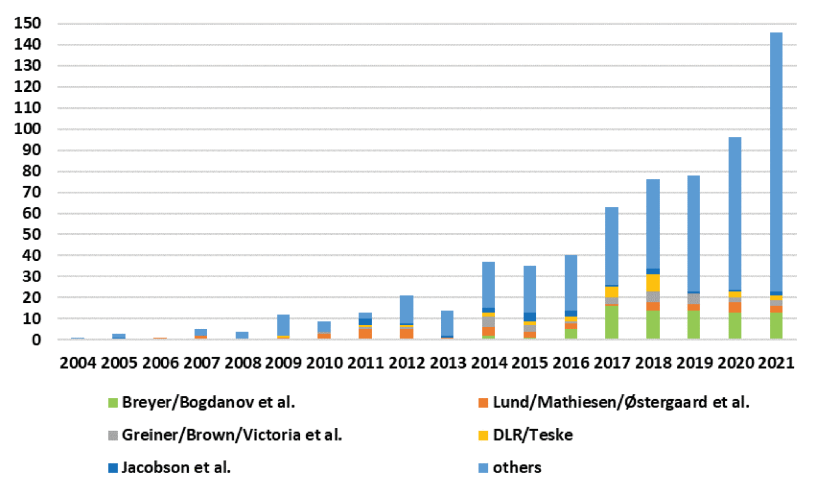
Development of peer-reviewed journal articles based on 100% RE system analyses for concrete geographic entities

Even in the early 21st century, it was extraordinary for scientists and decision-makers to consider the concept of 100% renewable electricity. However, renewable energy progress has been so rapid that things have totally changed since then:

Solar photovoltaic modules have dropped about 75 percent in price. Current scientific and technological advances in the laboratory suggest that they may become less expensive than the cost of installation of a photovoltaic system on residential or commercial buildings. On-shore wind power is spreading over all continents and is economically competitive with fossil and nuclear power in several regions. Concentrated solar thermal power (CST) with thermal storage has moved from the demonstration stage of maturity to the limited commercial stage and still has the potential for further cost reductions of about 50 percent.

Renewable energy use has grown much faster than even advocates had anticipated. Wind turbines generate 39 percent of Danish electricity, and Denmark has many biogas digesters and waste-to-energy plants as well. Together, wind and biomass provide 44% of the electricity consumed by the country's six million inhabitants. In 2010, Portugal's 10 million people produced more than half their electricity from indigenous renewable energy resources. Spain's 40 million inhabitants meet one-third of their electrical needs from renewables.

Renewable energy has a history of strong public support. In America, for example, a 2013 Gallup survey showed that two in three Americans want the U.S. to increase domestic energy production using solar power (76%), wind power (71%), and natural gas (65%). Far fewer want more petroleum production (46%) and more nuclear power (37%). Least favored is coal, with about one in three Americans favouring it.

REN21 says renewable energy already plays a significant role and there are many policy targets that aim to increase this:

At the national level, at least 30 nations around the world already have renewable energy contributing more than 20% of energy supply. National renewable energy markets are projected to continue to grow strongly in the coming decade and beyond, and some 120 countries have various policy targets for longer-term shares of renewable energy, including a binding 20% by 2020 target for the European Union. Some countries have much higher long-term policy targets of up to 100% renewables. Outside Europe, a diverse group of 20 or more other countries target renewable energy shares in the 2020–2030 time frame that range from 10% to 50%.

Supporters of 100% renewable energy do not consider nuclear power as renewable or sustainable due to perceived risks of disasters and high-level waste management, and consider carbon capture and storage to have limited safe storage potential. These constraints have also led to an interest in 100% renewable energy. A well established body of academic literature has been written over the past decade, evaluating scenarios for 100% renewable energy for various geographical areas. In recent years, more detailed analyses have emerged from government and industry sources. The incentive to use 100% renewable energy is created by global warming and ecological as well as economic concerns, post peak oil.

The first country to propose 100% renewable energy was Iceland, in 1998. Proposals have been made for Japan in 2003, and for Australia in 2011. Albania, Iceland, and Paraguay obtain essentially all of their electricity from renewable sources (Albania and Paraguay 100% from hydroelectricity, Iceland 72% hydro and 28% geothermal). Norway obtains nearly all of its electricity from renewable sources (97 percent from hydropower). Iceland proposed using hydrogen for transportation and its fishing fleet. Australia proposed biofuel for those elements of transportation not easily converted to electricity. The road map for the United States, commitment by Denmark, and Vision 2050 for Europe set a 2050 timeline for converting to 100% renewable energy, later reduced to 2040 in 2011. Zero Carbon Britain 2030 proposes eliminating carbon emissions in Britain by 2030 by transitioning to renewable energy. In 2015, Hawaii enacted a law that the Renewable Portfolio Standard shall be 100 percent by 2045. This is often confused with renewable energy. If electricity produced on the grid is 65 GWh from fossil fuel and 35 GWh from renewable energy and rooftop off grid solar produces 80 GWh of renewable energy, then the total renewable energy is 115 GWh and the total electricity on the grid is 100 GWh. Then the RPS is 115 percent.

Cities like Paris and Strasbourg in France, planned to use 100% renewable energy by 2050.

Similarly, in the United States, the independent National Research Council has noted that "sufficient domestic renewable resources exist to allow renewable electricity to play a significant role in future electricity generation and thus help confront issues related to climate change, energy security, and the escalation of energy costs ... Renewable energy is an attractive option because renewable resources available in the United States, taken collectively, can supply significantly greater amounts of electricity than the total current or projected domestic demand."

It is estimated that the world will spend an extra $8 trillion over the next 25 years to prolong the use of non-renewable resources, a cost that would be eliminated by transitioning instead to 100% renewable energy. Research that has been published in Energy Policy suggests that converting the entire world to 100% renewable energy by 2050 is both possible and affordable, but requires political support. It would require building many more wind turbines and solar power systems but wouldn't utilize bioenergy. Other changes involve use of electric cars and the development of enhanced transmission grids and storage. As part of the Paris Agreement, countries periodically update their climate change targets for the future, by 2018 no G20 country had committed to a 100% renewable target.

Until 2018, there were 181 peer-reviewed papers on 100% renewable energy. In the same year, 100% renewable energy was also mentioned in the Special Report on Global Warming of 1.5 °C as a potential means to "expand the range of 1.5 °C pathways", if the findings can be corroborated.

World total primary energy consumption by type in 2020
1. Oil (31.2%)
2. Coal (27.2%)
3. Natural Gas (24.7%)
4. Hydro (renewables) (6.90%)
5. Nuclear (4.30%)
6. Others (renewables) (5.70%)

As of 2021, wind and solar were consistently increasing their share worldwide, but still represented just 5% of global primary energy consumption, albeit far more of useful energy consumption. A report by J.P. Morgan Asset Management (the biggest lender to fossil fuels in the world) analyzed renewable energy forecasts made by eight scientists and research bodies (including Bent Sorensen, Mark Z. Jacobson, Amory Lovins) between 1970 and 2020 and claimed that all of them were unrealistically optimistic as they ignored "energy density, intermittency and the complex realities of incumbent energy systems".

== Places with near 100% renewable electricity ==
The following places meet 90% or more of their average yearly electricity demand with renewable energy (incomplete list):

- Albania: Hydroelectric
- American Samoa
  - Tau: ~100% solar power, with battery backup
- Australia
  - Tasmania: Hydropower supplies 100 percent of Tasmania's electricity. (Pending legislation plans for %200 renewable power by 2040, with the remainder to be sent to mainland Australia via submarine power cables)
- Austria
  - Lower Austria: 63% hydroelectricity, 26% wind, 9% biomass, 2% solar
- Bhutan: Largely hydroelectricity; exports 70% of its production due to excess energy generated; no fossil fuel power plants.
- Canada
  - British Columbia: 97% hydroelectric
  - Manitoba: 97% hydroelectricity, 3% wind, <1% petroleum (diesel in four off-grid communities), <1% natural gas
  - Newfoundland and Labrador: 95% hydroelectricity
  - Quebec: 99% renewable electricity is the main energy used in Quebec (41%), followed by oil (38%) and natural gas (10%)
  - Yukon: 94% hydroelectricity
- Costa Rica: 99% renewable electricity. Hydroelectric (90%), geothermal, wind (and others)
- Democratic Republic of the Congo: Almost 100% hydro, but only 9% have access to electricity.
- Denmark
  - Samsø: Net greater than 100% wind power and biomass, connected to mainland for balance and backup power
- Ethiopia: Mostly hydroelectricity (>90%). Smaller quantities of wind, solar, and geothermal. 45% of the population has access to electricity As of 2018, and there is a 100% access target set in 2017 for 2025.
- Germany
  - Aller-Leine Valley: 63.5% wind, 30% biogas, 10.7% hydro, 3.1% solar
  - Wildpoldsried, Bavaria: 500% wind, solar, hydro
- Greece
  - Tilos: 100% wind and solar power, with battery backup
- Iceland: 72% hydroelectricity, 28% geothermal, wind, and solar power, less than 0.1% combustible fuel (off-grid diesel)
- Norway: 96% hydroelectricity, 2% combustible fuel, 2% geothermal, wind, and solar
- New Zealand
  - South Island: 98.2% hydroelectricity and 1.6% wind. Around one-fifth of generation is exported to the North Island.
  - Tokelau: 93% solar power, with battery backup and 7% coconut biofuel
- Paraguay: Electricity sector in Paraguay is 100% hydroelectricity, about 90% of which is exported, remaining 10% covers domestic demand
- Tajikistan: Hydropower supplies nearly 100 percent of Tajikistan's electricity.
- United Kingdom
  - Scotland: 97% of electricity (2020) produced from renewables, mainly wind followed by hydroelectric.
- United States
  - Kodiak Island, Alaska: 80.9% hydroelectricity, 19.8% wind power, 0.3% diesel generator
  - Palo Alto, California: 50% hydro, rest a combination of solar, wind and biogas
  - Aspen, Colorado: Hydroelectric, wind and solar and geothermal
  - Greensburg, Kansas: 100% - wind balanced with grid connection
  - Georgetown, Texas: 100% - 154MW solar and wind balanced with grid connection
  - Burlington, Vermont: 35.3% hydro, 35.3% wood, 27.9% wind, 1.4% solar photovoltaic
  - Washington
    - Centralia: 90.6% hydro, 7.9% nuclear
    - Chelan County: 100% renewable energy made up of 99.98% hydroelectric and 0.02% wind power.
    - Douglas County: 100% hydro
    - Pend Oreille County: 97.1% hydro
    - Seattle: 86% hydroelectricity, 7% wind, 1% biogas
    - Tacoma: 85% hydro, 6% wind
- Uruguay: 94.5% renewable electricity; wind power (and biomass and solar power) is used to stretch hydroelectricity reserves into the dry season

Some other places have high percentages, for example the electricity sector in Denmark, as of 2014, is 45% wind power, with plans in place to reach 85%. The electricity sector in Canada and the electricity sector in New Zealand have even higher percentages of renewables (mostly hydro), 65% and 75% respectively, and Austria is approaching 70%. As of 2015, the electricity sector in Germany sometimes meets almost 100% of the electricity demand with PV and wind power, and renewable electricity is over 25%. Albania has 94.8% of installed capacity as hydroelectric, 5.2% diesel generator; but Albania imports 39% of its electricity. In 2016, Portugal achieved 100% renewable electricity for four days between 7 and 11 May, partly because efficient energy use had reduced electricity demand. France and Sweden have low carbon intensity, since they predominantly use a mixture of nuclear power and hydroelectricity. In 2018 Scotland met 76% of their demand from renewable sources.

Although electricity is currently around a quarter of world energy supply and consumption; primary energy use is expected to decrease with renewable energy deployment as electricity use increases, as it is likely to be combined with some degree of further electrification. For example, electric cars achieve much better fuel efficiency than fossil fuel cars, and another example is renewable heat such as in the case of Denmark, which is proposing to move to greater use of heat pumps for heating buildings to provide multiple kilowatts of heat per kilowatt of electricity.

== 100% clean electricity ==
Other electricity generating sources are considered clean, though not necessarily renewable, as they also do not emit carbon dioxide or other greenhouse gases and air pollutants. The largest of these is nuclear energy, which produces no emissions. Some argue that transitioning to 100% renewable energy would be too slow to limit climate change, and that closing down nuclear power stations is a mistake. Carbon capture and storage projects may still use coal or natural gas but capture carbon dioxide for storage or alternative uses. Pathways to eliminate greenhouse gases may include these in addition to renewable energy to save money, or to avoid shutting down existing plants and allow for flexibility in designing a carbon-free electric grid.

In 2018, California passed SB 100, which mandates 100% clean, carbon-free by 2045, including a 60% renewable electricity goal by 2030. 2019 legislation in Washington also requires 100% clean electricity by 2045, eliminating coal by 2025. Further states and territories to require 100% carbon-free electricity are Hawaii, Maine, Minnesota, Nevada, New Mexico, New York, Virginia, Puerto Rico, and Washington, DC. According to a study by Global Energy Monitor, China is expected to generate 1,200 gigawatts of renewable energy (wind and solar) by 2025.

== Obstacles ==
According to Mark Z. Jacobson, the most significant barriers to the widespread implementation of large-scale renewable energy and low carbon energy strategies, at the pace required to prevent runaway climate change, are primarily political and not technological. According to the 2013 Post Carbon Pathways report, which reviewed many international studies, the key roadblocks are:

- Climate change denial
- Efforts to impede renewable energy by the fossil fuel industry
- Political paralysis
- Unsustainable consumption of energy and resources
- Path dependencies and outdated infrastructure
- Financial and governance constraints

In 2011, the Intergovernmental Panel on Climate Change, some of the world's leading climate researchers selected by the United Nations, said "as infrastructure and energy systems develop, in spite of the complexities, there are few, if any, fundamental technological limits to integrating a portfolio of renewable energy technologies to meet a majority share of total energy demand in locations where suitable renewable resources exist or can be supplied". IPCC scenarios "generally indicate that growth in renewable energy will be widespread around the world". The IPCC said that if governments were supportive, and the full complement of renewable energy technologies were deployed, renewable energy supply could account for almost 80% of the world's energy use within forty years. Rajendra Pachauri, chairman of the IPCC, said the necessary investment in renewables would cost only about 1% of global GDP annually. This approach could contain greenhouse gas levels to less than 450 parts per million, the safe level beyond which climate change becomes catastrophic and irreversible.

Stephen W. Pacala and Robert H. Socolow have developed a series of "climate stabilization wedges" that can allow societies to maintain their quality of life while avoiding catastrophic climate change, and "renewable energy sources", in aggregate, constitute the largest number of their "wedges".

=== Lack of urgency and coordination ===
Lester R. Brown founder and president of the Earth Policy Institute, a nonprofit research organization based in Washington, D.C., says a rapid transition to 100% renewable energy is both possible and necessary. Brown compares with the U.S. entry into World War II and the subsequent rapid mobilization and transformation of the US industry and economy. A quick transition to 100% renewable energy and saving of our civilization is proposed by Brown to follow an approach with similar urgency.

=== Required minerals ===
According to World Bank the "below 2 °C" climate scenario requires 3 billions of tonnes of metals and minerals by 2050. Supply of mined resources such as zinc, molybdenum, silver, nickel, copper must increase by up to 500%. A 2018 study analysed the metal requirements to transition the global energy system up to 2060. Currently used battery technologies and known reserves are not compatible with the transition scenario as a result of insufficient cobalt and lithium reserves. Batteries containing less or no cobalt are feasible. Lithium is much more difficult to replace with maintained performance and cost.

=== Institutional inertia ===
A review suggests large institutions are prone to resisting "the challenge of 100% RE scenarios based on the dogma that the world cannot do without fossil fuels and nuclear energy". Institutions that have received extensive criticism include the International Energy Agency and the Intergovernmental Panel on Climate Change, with the latter also being criticized for not including studies on 100% RE systems in their IPCC reports.

=== Manufacturing concentration in China ===
A report found that China is about to produce "almost 95% of the world's polysilicon and the ingots and wafers" of the solar panel supply chain, with this level of concentration in any global supply chain "would represent a considerable vulnerability".

=== Intermittency ===
One of the main obstacles to 100% renewable energy is the intermittency or variability of renewable energy sources – such as times when sufficient amounts of energy can be generated neither via wind nor via solar power ("Dunkelflauten").

Proposed notable options to manage this intermittency by the time the first transitional period to 100% renewable energy is completed include:

- certain forms of (flexible) dispatchable generation such as biomass (including forms of pellet fuel, woodchips, algae fuel/bioreactors, and biomass grown on land formerly used for meat-production) or hydroelectricity
- diversification of (nonsynchronous) renewables
- super grids (due to foreign unique capacities/resources for generation and storage) and strengthening interconnections and larger grids in general (due to differences in weather or daytime)
- curtailing excess generation and power-to-X (e.g. producing green hydrogen immediately when there is abundant energy)
- Geothermal energy to reduce energy storage needs or potentially as dispatchable energy via in-reservoir storage
- oversizing solar and wind capacities
- flexible energy demand- and supply-regulating smart grids
  - Demand response technologies
  - Vehicle-to-grid uses a vehicle's battery to supply the grid when needed
  - Smart scheduling
  - Monitoring and/or controlling energy use that is noncritical during periods of peak power consumption, and returning their function during nonpeak hours, such as for residential devices (like washing machines)
  - Optimizing the interaction between electricity, heat, transport, and industry
- technologies and options for energy storage For example:
  - Batteries
  - Thermal energy storage
  - Ammonia
  - Green hydrogen

In 2013, Smil analyzed proposals to depend on wind and solar-generated electricity including the proposals of Jacobson and colleagues, and writing in an issue of Spectrum prepared by the Institute of Electrical and Electronics Engineers, he identified numerous points of concern, such as cost, intermittent power supply, growing NIMBYism, and a lack of infrastructure as negative factors and said that "History and a consideration of the technical requirements show that the problem is much greater than these advocates have supposed." Smil and Hansen are concerned about the variable output of solar and wind power. According to Amory Lovins the electricity grid alone can compensate for variability, just as it routinely backs up nonworking coal-fired and nuclear plants with working ones.

In November 2014 the Intergovernmental Panel on Climate Change came out with their fifth report, saying that in the absence of any one technology (such as bioenergy, carbon dioxide capture and storage, nuclear, wind and solar), climate change mitigation costs can increase substantially depending on which technology is absent. For example, it may cost 40% more to reduce carbon emissions without carbon dioxide capture. (Table 3.2) According to a 2018 study, "in the absence of firm low-carbon [dispatchable] resources, the cost of decarbonizing power generation rises rapidly as the emissions limit approaches zero" and a renewable-only generation (with batteries) results in energy prices 42-163% higher in regions with lower VRE availability, and 11-105% higher in regions with higher VRE availability. The study introduced the term "firm low-carbon energy source" (e.g. nuclear, geothermal), which is intended to operate along "fast-burst" sources (e.g. batteries) and "fuel saving" (VRE).

The International Energy Agency says that there has been too much attention on issue of the variability of renewable electricity production. The issue of intermittent supply applies to popular renewable technologies, mainly wind power and solar photovoltaics, and its significance depends on a range of factors that include the market penetration of the renewables concerned, the balance of plant and the wider connectivity of the system, as well as the demand side flexibility. Variability is rarely a barrier to increased renewable energy deployment when dispatchable generation such as hydroelectricity or solar thermal storage is also available. But at high levels of market penetration it requires careful analysis and management, and additional costs may be required for back-up or system modification. Renewable electricity supply in the 20-50+% penetration range has already been implemented in several European systems, albeit in the context of an integrated European grid system:

=== Seasonal energy storage ===
Hydropower is currently the only large scale low-carbon seasonal energy storage. In countries with high variation in energy demand by season (for example the UK uses far more gas for heating in the winter than it uses electricity) but lacking hydropower electrical interconnectors to countries with lots of hydropower (e.g. UK - Norway), electricity from hydropower is likely to be insufficient and development of a hydrogen economy would likely be needed: this is being trialled in the UK and 8 TWh of inter-seasonal hydrogen energy storage has been proposed.

In Australia, as well as storing renewable energy as hydrogen, it is also proposed to be exported in the form of ammonia. This project has been cancelled.

=== Cost ===
McKinsey estimates that it will cost 7.5% of global domestic product between 2021 and 2050 to achieve net zero (not 100% renewable, which will be more expensive). Current spending is just over half of this.

=== Open research questions ===
A review identified major gaps and neglected aspects – open research questions – in the 100% RE literature. These include:

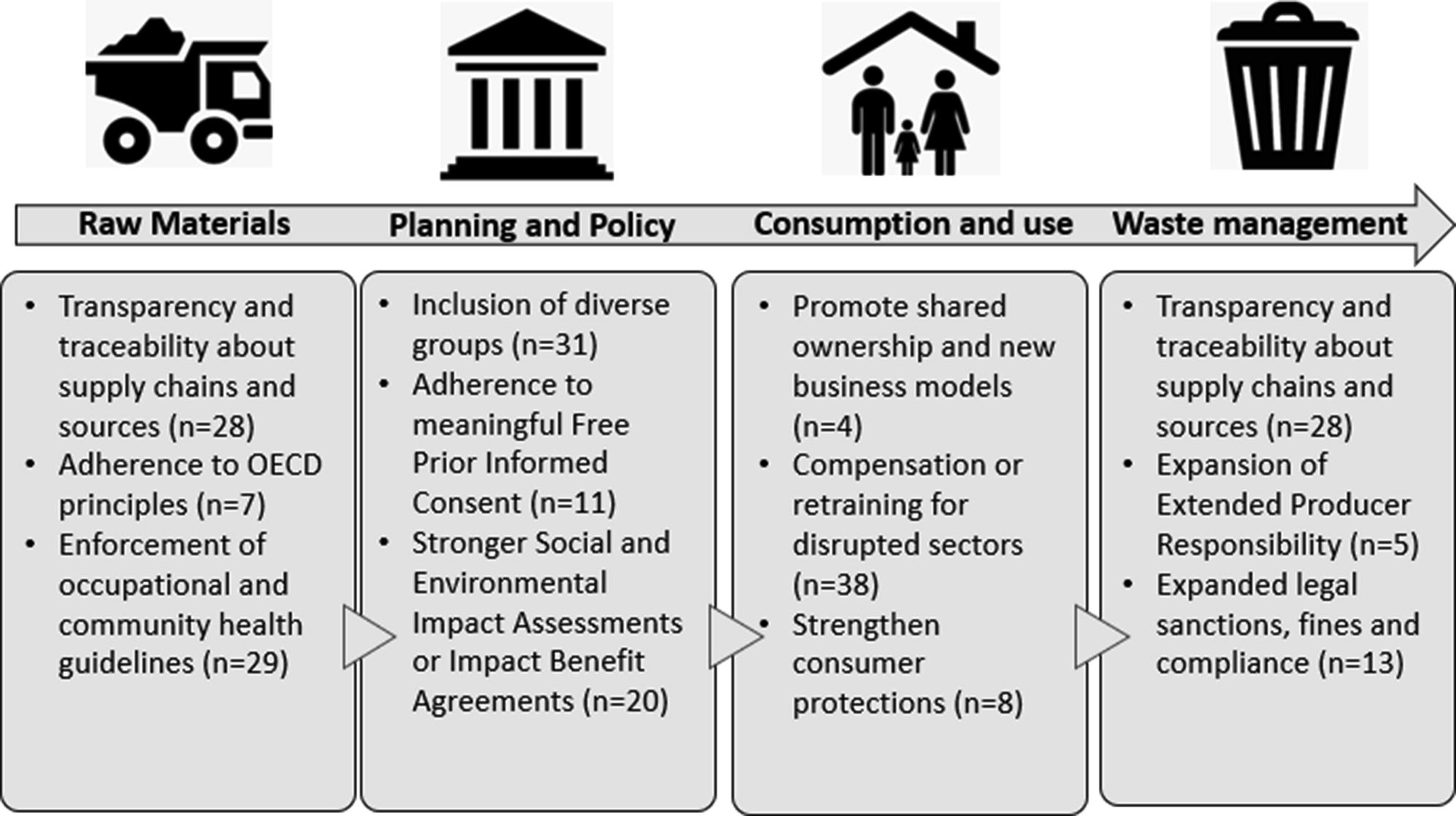
A multi-scalar policy mix for reducing vulnerability to low-carbon transitions

- Coupling of energy system models and integrated assessment models
- Holistic analysis of material criticality for 100% RE systems, with consideration of recycling
- Impact of inter-annual resource variations and respective inter-annual storage demand
- District heating and cooling in transition scenarios
- Increased geo-spatial resolution and coverage of global 100% RE system analyses
- Including off-grid solutions or a transition of off-grid and on-grid solutions in comprehensive energy system transition pathways
- Societal risks and issues of the transition, including linking it to energy security and consequences for peace and stability, and maximum area availability in societies
- Model intercomparisons of analyses
- Various questions for design particulars of intermittency management
- Issues of equity, environmental issues, community wellbeing, energy justice, social acceptance, and good governance – research on how to make RE technologies more equitable, accountable, and just, which may help to both contextualize and manage this potential barrier (including policy mechanisms)

== Plans and models ==
Name of Plan	Organization	Regional Scale	Publication (year)	Warming Target	Timescale	Total Investments	Number of Jobs	Total CO2 Emissions (gt CO2)	Primary Energy Supply (GW)	Final Energy Demand (GW)	Energy Sources at End of Timeline				
Name of Plan	Organization	Regional Scale	Publication (year)	Warming Target	Timescale	Total Investments	Number of Jobs	Total CO2 Emissions (gt CO2)	Primary Energy Supply (GW)	Final Energy Demand (GW)	Solar	Wind	Biomass	Hydro	Other
Project Drawdown (Global)	Project Drawdown	Global	Living	1.5-2C		N/A	N/A	N/A	N/A	N/A					N/A
Princeton Net-Zero by 2050 (USA)	Princeton	USA	2020	N/A	2020-2050	5910	8.5 million	78	20465.29121	14582.09104	29%	53%	17%	1%	0%
Carbon-Neutral Pathways for the United States: Central (USA)	University of San Francisco / UC Berkeley	USA	2021	2, 1.5, 1C	no target	Decarbonization: 600/Yr	0	0	15190	0	34%	64%	0%	2%	0%
Carbon-Neutral Pathways for the United States: 100% RE (USA)	University of San Francisco / UC Berkeley	Global	2021	2C, 1.5C, and 1C	2070	0.2-1.2% of annual GDP	0	74.8	15190	0	0%	Several different scenarios clearly laid out in SI	0%	0%	0%
Achieving the Paris Climate Agreement Goals Global and Regional 100% Renewable Energy Scenarios with Non-energy GHG Pathways for +1.5 °C and +2 °C (Global)	University of Technology Sydney - Institute for Sustainable Futures	USA	2019	1.5 C by 2050	2020-2050	63500 (total investments from 2015 to 2020)	47.8 million	450	114444	70277	32%	17%	14%	2%	0%
Designing a Model for the Global Energy System—GENeSYS-MOD: An Application of the Open-Source Energy Modeling System (OSeMOSYS) (Global)	Workgroup for Infrastructure and Policy, TU Berlin	Global	2017	650 Gt of CO2 (compared to the predicted 550-1300 emitted between 2011 and 2050) / 1.5-2 C (section 3.5)	2020-2050	N/A	N/A	519	N/A	97575	23%	36%	32%	8%	0%
Global Energy System Based on 100% Renewable Energy	LUT University	Global	2019	net-zero emissions by 2050	2050	7200	35 million	115	141189	134018	72%	18%	6%	3%	0%
Energy System Model (GENeSYS-MOD) (Mexico)	DIW Berlin, Cide Mexico	Mexico	2019	Full decaronization of the energy system by 2050.		n/a	n/a	7.16 for renewable target and 12 for national target. P. 15	n/a	320.73 GW for national target, 842.89, GW 100% renewables	78%	22%	0%	<1%	0%
Energy System Model (GENeSYS-MOD) - 100% RE Scenario	DIW Berlin, Cide Mexico	Mexico		Full decaronization of the energy system by 2050.		N/A	N/A	7.16	N/A	8835.914153	58%	27%	15%	1%	0%
Transformation towards a Renewable Energy System in Brazil and Mexico—Technological and Structural Options for Latin America		Mexico	2018	70-95% emissions reduction		N/A	0	0	0	0	0%	0%	0%	0%	0%
Advanced Energy [r]evolution	Greenpeace	Global	2021	>2 degrees		48	0	0	0	149722.222	32%	32%	1%	1%	34%
Basic Energy [r]evolution	Greenpeace	Global		>2 degrees		64.6	0	0	0	80277.7778	16%	30%	4%	10%	38%
100% Clean and Renewable Wind, Water, and Sunlight All-Sector Energy Roadmaps for 139 Countries of the World	Stanford	Global/intern.	2017	Net Zero by 2050		124700	24262122	N/A	N/A	N/A	58%	37%	0%	4%	-36%
Full energy sector transition towards 100% renewable energy supply: Integrating power, heat, transport and industry sectors including desalination	LUT University	Global	2020	Net Zero by 2050	2050										
Zero air pollution and zero carbon from all energy at low cost and without blackouts in variable weather throughout the U.S. with 100% wind-water-solar and storage	Stanford	USA	2021	Net Zero by 2050	2050										

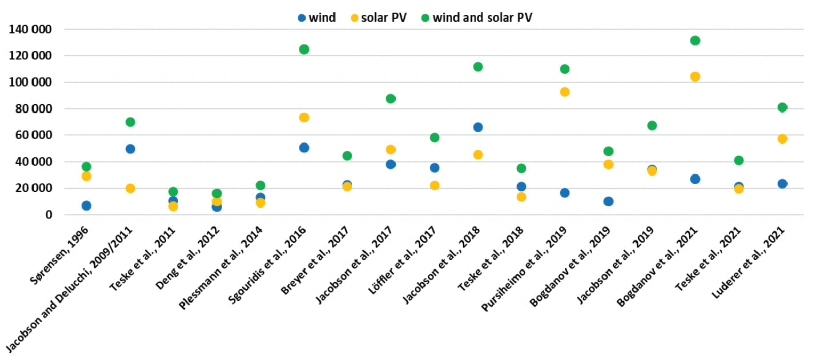
Solar PV and wind electricity generation in (TWh per yr) in global 100% RE scenarios in the year 2050

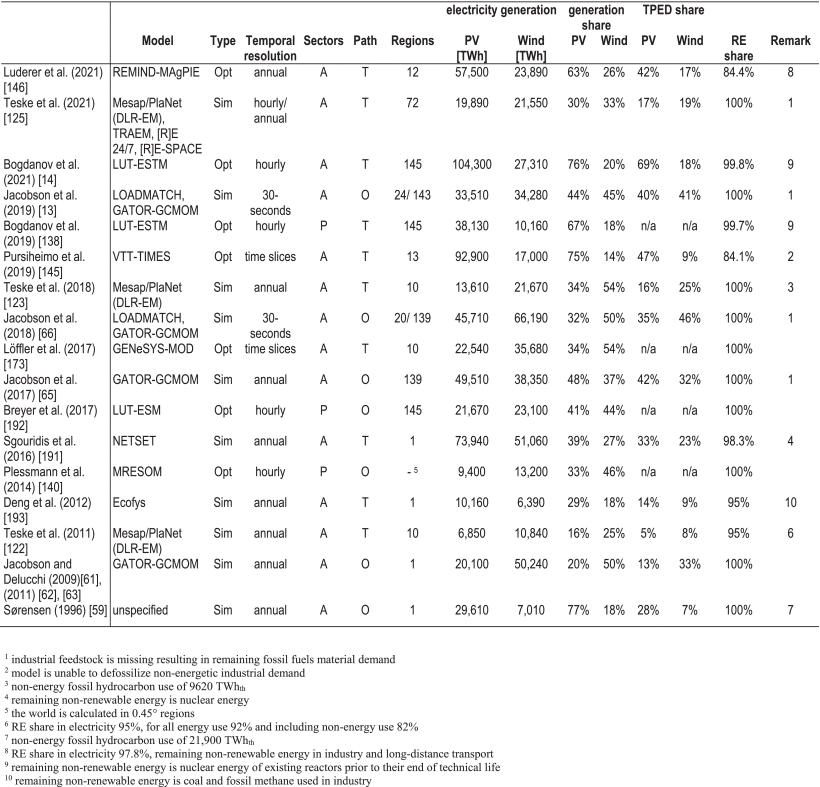
Global 100% RE system analyses

== Recent developments ==
The Fourth Revolution: Energy is a German documentary film released in 2010. It shows the vision of a global society, which lives in a world where the energy is produced 100% with renewable energies, showing a complete reconstruction of the economy to reach this goal. In 2011, Hermann Scheer wrote the book The Energy Imperative: 100 Percent Renewable Now, published by Routledge.

Reinventing Fire is a book by Amory Lovins released in October 2011. Lovins claims that combining reduced energy use with energy efficiency gains would result in a $5 trillion saving and a faster-growing economy. This can all be done with the profitable commercialization of existing energy-saving technologies, through market forces, led by business. Former US president Bill Clinton says the book is a "wise, detailed and comprehensive blueprint". The first paragraph of the preface says:

Imagine fuel without fear. No climate change. No oil spills, dead coal miners, dirty air, devastated lands, lost wildlife. No energy poverty. No oil-fed wars, tyrannies, or terrorists. Nothing to run out. Nothing to cut off. Nothing to worry about. Just energy abundance, benign and affordable, for all, for ever.

The Intergovernmental Panel on Climate Change has said that there are few fundamental technological limits to integrating a portfolio of renewable energy technologies to meet most of total global energy demand. In a 2011 review of 164 recent scenarios of future renewable energy growth, the report noted that the majority expected renewable sources to supply more than 17% of total energy by 2030, and 27% by 2050; the highest forecast projected 43% supplied by renewables by 2030 and 77% by 2050.

In 2011, the International Energy Agency has said that solar energy technologies, in its many forms, can make considerable contributions to solving some of the most urgent problems the world now faces:

The development of affordable, inexhaustible and clean solar energy technologies will have huge longer-term benefits. It will increase countries' energy security through reliance on an indigenous, inexhaustible and mostly import-independent resource, enhance sustainability, reduce pollution, lower the costs of mitigating climate change, and keep fossil fuel prices lower than otherwise. These advantages are global. Hence the additional costs of the incentives for early deployment should be considered learning investments; they must be wisely spent and need to be widely shared.

In 2011, the refereed journal Energy Policy published two articles by Mark Z. Jacobson, a professor of engineering at Stanford University, and research scientist Mark A. Delucchi, about changing the energy supply mix and "Providing all global energy with wind, water, and solar power". The articles analyze the feasibility of providing worldwide energy for electric power, transportation, and heating/cooling from wind, water, and sunlight (WWS), which are safe clean options. In Part I, Jacobson and Delucchi discuss WWS energy system characteristics, aspects of energy demand, WWS resource availability, WWS devices needed, and material requirements. They estimate that 3,800,000 5 MW wind turbines, 5350 100 MW geothermal power plants, and 270 new 1300 MW hydroelectric power plants would be required. In terms of solar power, an additional 49,000 300 MW concentrating solar plants, 40,000 300 MW solar photovoltaic power plants, and 1.7 billion 3 kW rooftop photovoltaic systems would also be needed. Such an extensive WWS infrastructure could decrease world power demand by 30%. In Part II, Jacobson and Delucchi address variability of supply, system economics, and energy policy initiatives associated with a WWS system. The authors advocate producing all new energy with WWS by 2030 and replacing existing energy supply arrangements by 2050. Barriers to implementing the renewable energy plan are seen to be "primarily social and political, not technological or economic". Energy costs with a WWS system should be similar to today's energy costs.

In general, Jacobson has said wind, water and solar technologies can provide 100 percent of the world's energy, eliminating all fossil fuels. He advocates a "smart mix" of renewable energy sources to reliably meet electricity demand:

Because the wind blows during stormy conditions when the sun does not shine and the sun often shines on calm days with little wind, combining wind and solar can go a long way toward meeting demand, especially when geothermal provides a steady base and hydroelectric can be called on to fill in the gaps.

A 2012 study by the University of Delaware for a 72 GW system considered 28 billion combinations of renewable energy and storage and found the most cost-effective, for the PJM Interconnection, would use 17 GW of solar, 68 GW of offshore wind, and 115 GW of onshore wind, although at times as much as three times the demand would be provided. 0.1% of the time would require generation from other sources.

In March 2012, Denmark's parliament agreed on a comprehensive new set of promotional programs for energy efficiency and renewable energy aimed at reaching 100 percent of electricity, heat and fuels from renewables by 2050. IRENEC is an annual conference on 100% renewable energy started in 2011 by Eurosolar Turkey. The 2013 conference was in Istanbul.

More recently, Jacobson and his colleagues have developed detailed proposals for switching to 100% renewable energy produced by wind, water and sunlight, for New York, California and Washington states, by 2050. As of 2014, a more expansive new plan for the 50 states has been drawn up, which includes an online interactive map showing the renewable resource potential of each of the 50 states. The 50-state plan is part of The Solutions Project, an independent outreach effort led by Jacobson, actor Mark Ruffalo, and film director Josh Fox.

As of 2014, many detailed assessments show that the energy service needs of a world enjoying radically higher levels of wellbeing can be economically met entirely through the diverse currently available technological and organizational innovations around wind, solar, biomass, biofuel, hydroelectric, oceanic and geothermal energy. Debate over detailed plans remain, but transformations in global energy services based entirely around renewable energy are in principle technically practicable, economically feasible, socially viable, and so realisable. This prospect underpins the ambitious commitment by Germany, one of the world's most successful industrial economies, to undertake a major energy transition, Energiewende.

In 2015 a study was published in Energy and Environmental Science that describes a pathway to 100% renewable energy in the United States by 2050 without using biomass. Implementation of this roadmap is regarded as both environmentally and economically feasible and reasonable, as by 2050 it would save about $600 billion of health costs a year due to reduced air pollution and $3.3 trillion global warming costs. This would translate in yearly cost savings per head of around $8300 compared to a business as usual pathway. According to that study, barriers that could hamper implementation are neither technical nor economic but social and political, as most people didn't know that benefits from such a transformation far exceeded the costs.

In June 2017, twenty-one researchers published an article in the Proceedings of the National Academy of Sciences of the United States of America rejecting Jacobson's earlier PNAS article, accusing him of modeling errors and of using invalid modeling tools. They further asserted he made implausible assumptions through his reliance upon increasing national energy storage from 43 minutes to 7 weeks, increasing hydrogen production by 100,000%, and increasing hydropower by the equivalent of 600 Hoover Dams. Article authors David G. Victor called Jacobson's work "dangerous" and Ken Caldeira emphasized that increasing hydropower output by 1,300 gigawatts, a 25% increase, is the equivalent flow of 100 Mississippi Rivers. Jacobson published a response in the same issue of the PNAS and also authored a blog post where he asserted the researchers were advocates of the fossil fuel industry. Another study published in 2017 confirmed the earlier results for a 100% renewable power system for North America, without changes in hydropower assumptions, but with more realistic emphasis on a balanced storage portfolio, in particular seasonal storage, and for competitive economics.

=== Grid integration simulation ===
In 2015, Jacobson and Delucchi, together with Mary Cameron and Bethany Frew, examined with computer simulation (Loadmatch), in more detail how a wind-water-solar (WWS) system can track the energy demand from minute to minute. This turned out to be possible in the United States for 6 years, including WWS variability by extreme weather events. In 2017, the plan was further developed for 139 countries by a team of 27 researchers and in 2018, Jacobson and Delucchi with Mary Cameron and Brian Mathiesen published the Loadmatch results for 20 regions in which the 139 countries in the world are divided. According to this research, a WWS system can follow the demand in all regions.

The program Loadmatch receives as input estimated series, per half minute during 2050–2055, of

- the energy demand
- the intermittent wind and solar energy supply predicted with a 3D global climate / weather model GATOR-GCMOM
- the hydropower, geothermal, tidal and wave energy

and specifications of

- the capacities and maximum loading / unloading speeds of the different types of storage
- losses due to storage, transport, distribution and maintenance
- a demand-supply management system (smart grid).

The program has been carried out for each region 10-20 times with adapted input for the storage capacities, until a solution was found in which the energy demand was followed, per half minute for 5 years, with low costs.

The WWS system is assumed to connect in the electric network

- geographically dispersed variable energy sources, concentrated solar power (CSP) and hydro power
- storage facilities: pumped hydro, as heat in CSP plants, in batteries, as hydrogen by electrolysis of water, or as compressed air underground.

	World	China	United States	Europe	Africa
Supply 2018	860	244	92	169	24
Supply 2050	12040	3223	1400	1157	580
Unused supply	2215	598	336	84	40
Transmission loss	807	221	98	77	37
Other loss	325	76	24	56	22
End-use	8693	2327	939	940	482
Storage (TWh)		1279	321	664	109

In 2020, Jacobson clarified in a textbook computer simulation results of a WWS energy system. To match demand with supply every minute more solar and wind farms and high-voltage lines must be installed than to match year-averaged demand and supply. Oversizing (also in a conventional energy system) ensures that the demand can be followed during peak hours, but causes unused supply during off-peak hours. In a WWS system, more energy exchange between areas leads to more transmission loss. The table shows WWS supply, unused supply, losses and end-use, in GW average power to reliably supply the world and four major regions with energy by 2050. See textbook Table 8.10; energy in TWh is divided by 26.3 kh (1000 hours) to get power in GW. The bottom row is the storage capacity of pumped hydro plants (Table 8.7).

== See also ==
- Carbon bubble
- Carbon neutrality
- Energy transition
- Individual and political action on climate change
- International Renewable Energy Agency
- Nuclear power proposed as renewable energy
- Timeline of sustainable energy research 2020–present
