= Energy Autonomy =

2006 book by Hermann Scheer

Energy Autonomy: The Economic, Social and Technological Case for Renewable Energy
- Author: Hermann Scheer
- Language: English
- Subject: Renewable energy
- Genre: Non-fiction
- Publisher: Routledge
- Publication date: 1 December 2006
- Media type: Print (Hardcover) e-Book
- Pages: 320
- ISBN: 1844073556

Energy Autonomy: The Economic, Social & Technological Case for Renewable Energy is a 2006 book written by Hermann Scheer. It was first published on 1 December 2006 through Routledge and discusses the topic of renewable energy.

== Synopsis ==
In the book Scheer discusses that for the past two hundred years industrial civilization has relied predominantly upon fossil fuels, which are abundant and cheap but also have adverse social and environmental effects. Scheer argues that it would be more beneficial if they transition to renewable energy and distributed, decentralized energy generation, as this is a model that has already been proven to be successful. Much progress with renewable energy commercialization has already been made in Europe where the renewable energy industry is a multi-billion Euro industry with high growth rates.

== Reception ==
Critical reception has been mostly positive. The Doctors for the Environment Australia gave the book a favorable review, commenting that "Energy Autonomy is engagingly written, well referenced, with informative tables and a good index." Ecological Economics also reviewed the book and wrote "Although some may find it a bit dry, heavy with policy, this book, by the director of EUROSOLAR, the European Association for Renewable Energy, gets right to the heart of the energy policy puzzle, wrestling with questions that are often skirted."

== See also ==
- Energy security and renewable technology
- List of books about renewable energy
