= Hermann Scheer =

German politician

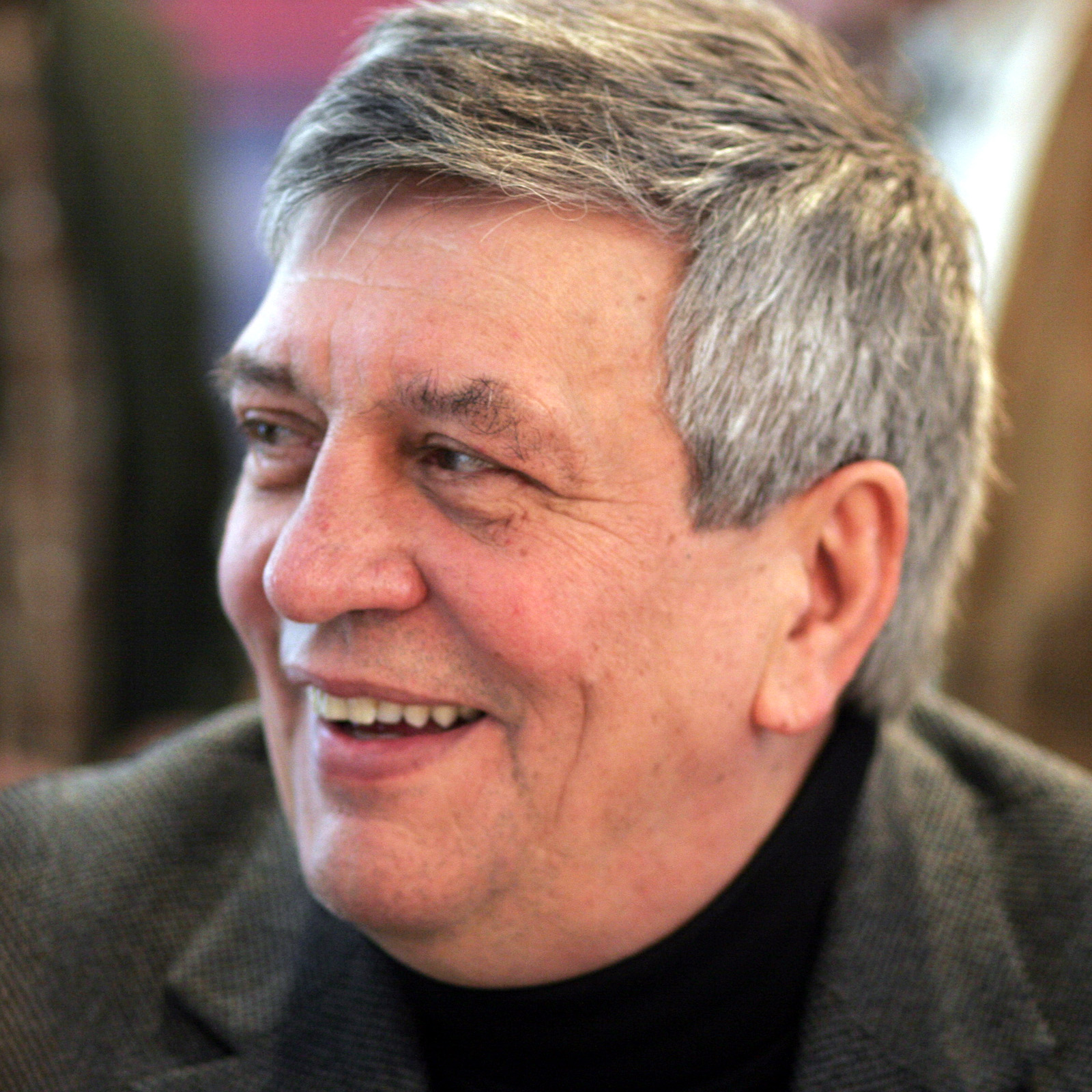
- Scheer in 2008

Member of Parliament for Social Democrat member of the German Bundestag (parliament)

Personal details
- Born: 29 April 1944 Wehrheim, Germany
- Died: 14 October 2010 (aged 66) Berlin, Germany
- Party: Social Democrat
- Occupation: Social Democrat member of the German Bundestag (parliament); President of Eurosolar (European Association for Renewable Energy)
- Awards: Right Livelihood Award

Hermann Scheer (29 April 1944 – 14 October 2010) was a Social Democrat member of the German Bundestag (parliament), President of Eurosolar (European Association for Renewable Energy) and General Chairman of the World Council for Renewable Energy. In 1999, Scheer was awarded the Right Livelihood Award for his "indefatigable work for the promotion of solar energy worldwide".

Scheer believed that the continuation of current patterns of energy supply and use would be environmentally, socially, economically, and politically damaging, with renewable energy being the only realistic alternative. Scheer had concluded that it is technically and environmentally feasible to harness enough solar radiation to achieve a total replacement of the foclear (fossil/nuclear) energy system by a global renewable energy economy. The main obstacle to such a change is seen to be political, not technical or economic. In 1999 he was one of the initiators of the German feed-in tariffs that were the major source of the rise of renewable energies in Germany during the following years.

== Life ==
Scheer was born in Wehrheim, and was an excellent swimmer and member of the national youth pentathlon team. He became a member of the Social Democratic Party of Germany in 1965 during his military service as an officer in the Bundeswehr. From 1967 to 1972, Scheer studied law, politics, social sciences and economics at the Ruprecht Karls University of Heidelberg and the Free University of Berlin, graduating with a degree in political science and public law. In 1979, he received his Dr. rer. pol. degree from the Free University of Berlin.

As a student, he was involved in the re-establishment of the Social Democratic University Association in Heidelberg. In 1973, he became state chairman of the Baden-Württemberg Young Socialists and in 1974 their deputy federal chairman. Scheer supported the new, emphatically socialist course of the SPD youth organization, which was influenced by the student movement.

He worked as postgrade scientist at Universität Stuttgart and as a scientist (1976 till 1980) at the Forschungszentrum Karlsruhe (a large nuclear and basic research center). He became a member of the Bundestag in 1980, representing Baden-Württemberg; in 1993, he also became a member of the federal steering committee (Bundesvorstand) of the Social Democratic Party. Scheer had a solid track record as an anti-establishment figure within his own party.

In 1988, he was one of the co-founders of the non-profit association for renewable energies Eurosolar. Scheer had been its honorary president ever since, and his wife was its full-time managing director. Since June 2001, Scheer had been co-founder and honorary president of the newly founded World Council for Renewable Energy (WCRE).

From 1993 to 2009, he was a member of the SPD's federal executive committee. He had a significant influence on the SPD's environmental and energy policy. In the 2008 state election for the Landtag of Hesse, Scheer was originally pegged as minister for development, environment and economics in the shadow cabinet of Andrea Ypsilanti, candidate for Minister-President of Hesse in the election. He announced ambitious energy policy plans, which failed to gain favour with his own party and possible coalition partners. Leading SPD figures such as Jürgen Walter and Wolfgang Clement, a former Minister President of North Rhine Westphalia from the right wing of the party, who later left the party, were rather critical. Scheer however believed Ypsilanti's strategies would result in a big triumph of his party at the federal elections 2009. The election result saw the christian-liberal governing parties CDU and FDP lose the majority they had held since 1999 in the traditionally social democratic state. Yet, the result was very difficult because a left majority was not possible without the party The Left (which had been a merger of the ex-communist PDS and left SPD and labour union members, disappointed by the politics of former chancellor Gerhard Schröder). Although Ypsilanti had promised not to work with The Left, a party to which the SPD still had a controversial relationship but also had already worked with many years ago in other states, she refused to govern in a grand coalition under the CDU and did not want to give away the chance to form a new left government. So she successfully negotiated a minority coalition with the Greens, which would be tolerated by The Left. The final list for the proposed government put Scheer as secretary of a downsized ministry of economics still including the task to lead the transition to renewable energies. Ypsilanti's attempt to officially form her government was set to fail when four SPD representatives declined to elect a government with the support of The Left. This led to a disastrous result for the SPD in the following snap election in 2009, in which Scheer did not take part anymore, with CDU and FDP returned to a government majority. He did not stand for re-election to the federal executive committee in 2009, explaining in a letter that it had become "all too common" to "engage in political power games, produce sham solutions, and take personnel considerations into account that have nothing to do with the issues at hand," and that he did not want to be involved in this.

Scheer was chairman of the International Parliamentary Forum for Renewable Energy. He had been promoting the founding of the International Renewable Energy Agency (IRENA) for a long time, and IRENA was founded on 26 January 2009 in Bonn.

He was one of the co-founders and curator of the Institut Solidarische Moderne (ISM), which was founded in January 2010. He was also a member of the board of trustees of the Energiewerk Foundation and a member of the World Future Council.

His book Energy Autonomy was instrumental in the making of the film Die 4. Revolution – Energy Autonomy. Scheer advocated for the municipal ownership of utility companies, and was a supporter of the Campaign for the Establishment of a United Nations Parliamentary Assembly, an organisation which campaigns for democratic reformation of the United Nations.

In 2010, Scheer died from heart failure in a hospital in Berlin after an unspecified short and severe illness. His wife (since 1970), Irm Pontenagel, managed the solar lobby association Eurosolar for decades. His daughter Nina Scheer managed an eco management consulting company and is herself a member of the Bundestag.

== Member of the Parliament ==
Scheer had been a member of the German Bundestag since 1980. From 1982 to 1990, he was the SPD parliamentary group spokesman for disarmament and arms control, and then became chairman of the German Bundestag's subcommittee on Disarmament and Arms Control. He had been a member of the Parliamentary Assembly of the Council of Europe since 1983. From 1994 to 1997, he was chairman of the Committee on Agriculture. In the German Bundestag, he was one of the initiators of many laws promoting renewable energies, including the Feed-in Tariff Act for Renewable Energies (1990), the amendment to the Federal Building Act to give priority to renewable energies (1996), the 100,000 Roofs Programme (1999), the Renewable Energy Sources Act (2000) Act on Tax Exemption for Biofuels.

Alongside Michaele Hustedt, Hans-Josef Fell (both Alliance 90/The Greens) and Dietmar Schütz (SPD), Scheer is considered one of the founders of the Renewable Energy Sources Act, which included, for example, a cost-covering feed-in tariff for renewable energies such as solar power and became a model for 47 countries around the world.

Scheer was the SPD's direct candidate in the Waiblingen constituency, but was always elected to the Bundestag via the SPD's state list for Baden-Württemberg.

After his death, SPD politician Rita Schwarzelühr-Sutter took over his mandate via the German list system.

== Political positions ==
Since the late 1980s, Scheer had been campaigning at national and international level for the general replacement of nuclear and fossil fuels.

In the 1990s, Scheer was among the politicians who warned against the NATO eastward expansion. In his essay 'NATO Eastward Expansion – A Historically Wrong Course' published in 1996, he described the reasoning behind it as 'flimsy and contradictory' and its consequences as 'risky and dangerous'. It would transform NATO from a defensive alliance into a 'hegemonic alliance', further humiliate Russia in its weak phase and further erode Gorbachev’s and, initially, Yeltsin's visible willingness to disarm. Domestically, it would weaken Russia's democratisation process. It would also keep European countries in a state of 'security policy immaturity' or under US 'tutelage'. Scheer advocated a European security architecture independent of the United States within the framework of the OSCE and the WEU. In 1999, he distanced himself from the Bundeswehr's NATO mission during the Kosovo conflict, calling the intervention a war crime, which led to clashes with fellow SPD members.

Scheer's patron, former development aid minister and SPD politician Erhard Eppler, said of Hermann Scheer's achievements in raising awareness of the value of renewable energies:

"Hermann Scheer was one of my young guards back then, and he too was ridiculed as a crackpot for a long time, just like me. He endured every single mockery, lies, public attacks from all parties and headwinds from the energy companies – and in the end, thanks to his expertise and that of his advisors, he was able to dictate the Renewable Energy Sources Act to the Ministry of the Environment. That was more or less the achievement of a single politician!"

— What you have in mind would be a revolution...: A debate on growth, politics and the ethics of enough (2016)

Scheer criticised the privatisation of Deutsche Bahn AG and was involved in the 'Bürgerbahn statt Börsenbahn' (Citizens' Railway Instead of Stock Exchange Railway) initiative. In 2007, he accused the SPD leadership of pushing ahead with privatisation without democratic discussion, but gave in to the compromise proposal for partial privatisation of the railways during subsequent negotiations in 2008.

Scheer's speeches were featured in the documentary film Let's Make Money (2008) on various aspects of the development of the global financial system. He also played a central role in the film The 4th Revolution – Energy Autonomy (released in March 2010, a few months before Scheer's death), in which he advocated the global use of renewable energies.

Hermann Scheer was a critic of the Desertec desert power project, seeing the project as a reinforcement of the monopoly of energy companies and considering the transport and investment costs to be too high. In the context of the discussion and protests surrounding the Stuttgart 21 construction project, Scheer spoke out in favour of a more direct democracy and saw 'an alienation between citizens and elected representatives'.

Instead of the term renewable energy, Scheer often used the term permanent energy, which is Danish.

"My starting point is not renewable energies, but society – based on the recognition of the fundamental importance of the energy transition for its future viability. I did not come to politics for renewable energies, but rather from my view of the problem and my understanding of political responsibility for renewable energies. The transition to renewable energies is of civilisational significance. That is why we need to know how we can accelerate it. It is not renewable energies that are in short supply, it is time."

— Hermann Scheer: The Energy Imperative (2010),

== Awards ==
- 1990 Order of Merit of the Federal Republic of Germany
- 1997 Honorary Doctorate from the Technical University of Varna, Bulgaria
- 1998 World Prize for Solar Energy
- 1999 Right Livelihood Award
- 2000 World Prize for Bioenergy
- 2001 Wilhelm Dröscher Prize
- 2001 Book Prize from the German Environmental Foundation for the book Climate Change, written together with Carl Amery
- 2002 Hero for the Green Century – Honoured by the American TIME magazine
- 2004 World Prize for Wind Energy
- 2004 Gold Medal of the Federal Association of Hydropower Plants
- 2004 Global Renewable Energy Leadership Award
- 2005 Solar World Einstein Award
- 2007 Honorary Doctorate from the University of Lüneburg
- 2008 European Clean Tech Pioneer Award
- 2008 Honorary Professorship at Tongji University in Shanghai, PR China
- 2009 Karl Böer Medal of Merit for Solar Energy
- 2011 Honorary President of Eurosolar, posthumously

== Honours ==
Hermann Scheer is the namesake for two institutions, the Hermann Scheer School in Berlin-Oberschöneweide (upper secondary school with a focus on economics) and the Centre for Renewable Energies in Elberswalde, as well as streets in Kassel and Lichtenau.

== Hermann Scheer Foundation ==
A few weeks after Hermann Scheer's death, the Hermann Scheer Foundation (German: Hermann-Scheer-Stiftung) was established in Berlin as a non-profit legal entity under civil law. The Hermann Scheer Foundation has an executive board and a foundation council. At the time of its establishment, the foundation had assets of €125,000.

The foundation was established to continue Hermann Scheer's life's work and to contribute to the transition to the age of renewable energies. Among other things, the Hermann Scheer Foundation organises symposia and matinees, operates the information platform Energieallee A 7 in cooperation with Eurosolar and publishes various publications.

== Books ==
- The Energy Imperative: 100 Percent Renewable Now, 2011, Routledge.
- Energy Autonomy, The Economic, Social and Technological Case for Renewable Energy, 2006, Earthscan, ISBN 1-84407-355-6
- A Solar Manifesto, 2005, Earthscan, ISBN 1-902916-51-4
- The Solar Economy, Renewable Energy for a Sustainable Global Future, 2004, Earthscan, ISBN 1-84407-075-1

== See also ==
- Anti-nuclear movement in Germany
- Die 4. Revolution – Energy Autonomy
- Eurosolar
- Hans-Josef Fell
- International Renewable Energy Agency (IRENA)
- Michael Sladek
- Renewable energy commercialization
- Rolf Disch
- World Future Council
