= 2002 in the environment =

This is a list of notable events relating to the environment in 2002. They relate to environmental law, conservation, environmentalism and environmental issues.

== Events ==
- The year 2002 was dedicated as the International Year of Ecotourism and Mountains.
- The ASEAN Agreement on Transboundary Haze Pollution was signed between all ASEAN nations to reduce haze pollution in Southeast Asia.
- A number of protected areas were established in 2002, including Águas do Cuiabá Ecological Station, Brazil, and Black Canyon Wilderness (Nevada).
- At their conference in Berlin, the World Council for Renewable Energy adopts an "action plan for the Global Proliferation of Renewable Energy".

=== March ===
- The Earth observation satellite Envisat is launched by the European Space Agency.
- Native forest logging on public land ends in New Zealand.

=== April ===
- The Melbourne Principles for Sustainable Cities were drawn up in the Australian city of Melbourne.

=== July ===
- The Game and Feral Animal Control Act 2002 passes into law. It aimed to manage and regulate the hunting of game in New South Wales in Australia, but lead to over-population of feral deer.

=== August ===
- The World Summit on Sustainable Development, WSSD or Earth Summit 2002 took place in Johannesburg, South Africa, from 26 August to 4 September 2002. It was convened to discuss sustainable development by the United Nations.

=== November ===
- The Climate Change Response Act 2002 is passed by the government of New Zealand.
- The Prestige oil spill occurred off the coast of Galicia caused by the sinking of an oil tanker. The spill polluted thousands of kilometres of coastline and more than one thousand beaches on the Spanish, French and Portuguese coast, as well as causing great harm to the local fishing industry. The spill is the largest environmental disaster of both Spain's history and Portugal's history.

=== December ===
- The Species at Risk Act became law in Canada. It was designed to meet one of Canada's key commitments under the International Convention on Biological Diversity.

== See also ==
- Human impact on the environment
- List of years in the environment
