= Claudia Kemfert =

German economist

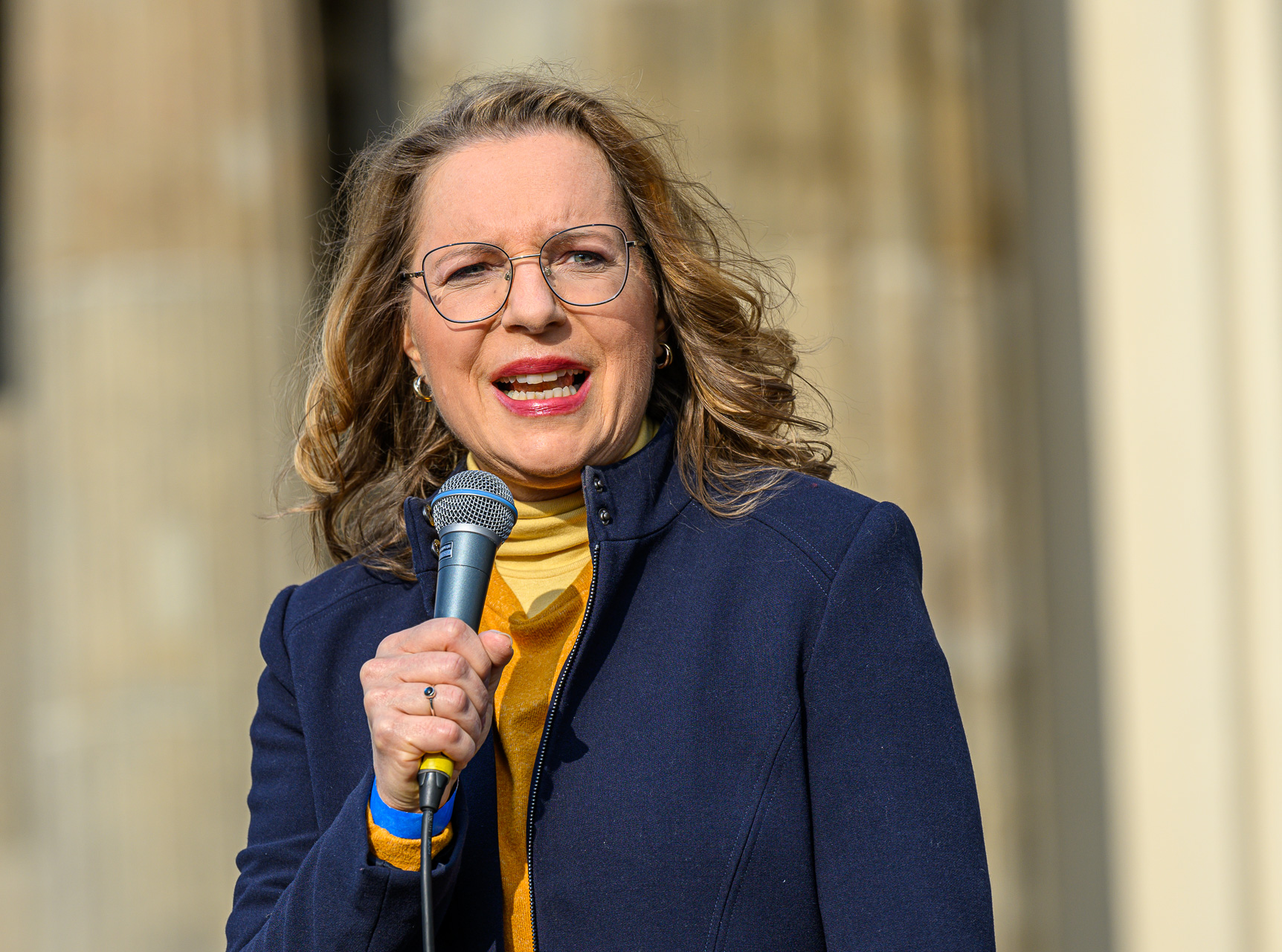
- Kemfert in 2022
- Born: 17 December 1968 (age 57); Delmenhorst, West Germany

Academic background
- Education: University of Oldenburg; Bielefeld University
- Doctoral advisor: Wolfgang Pfaffenberger

Academic work
- Discipline: Energy research; Environmental protection
- Website: Information at IDEAS / RePEc

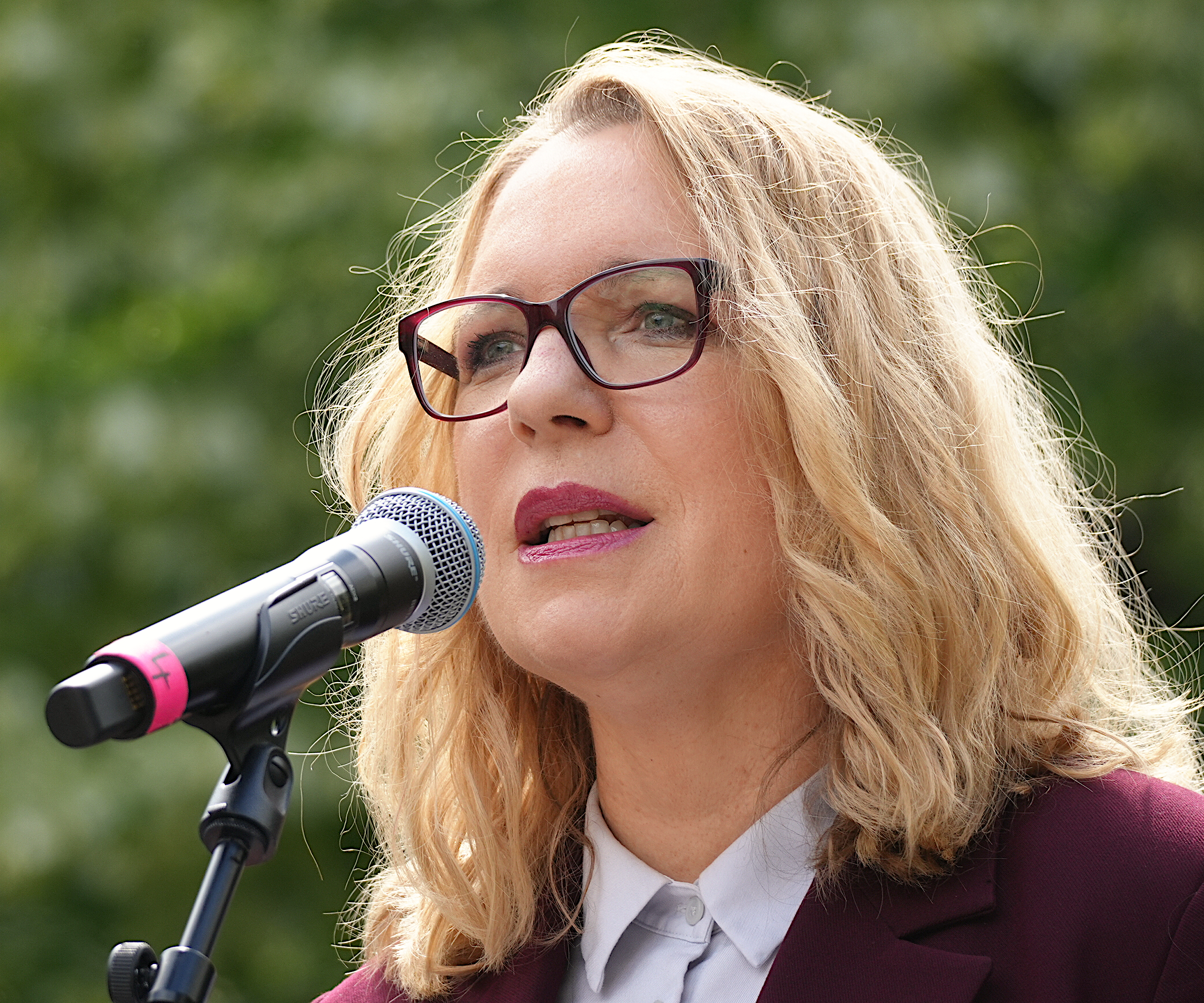
Kemfert speaking at Fridays for Future rally in Berlin, Germany on 31 May 2024

Claudia Kemfert (born 17 December 1968) is a German economist focussing on energy research and environmental protection. She was a Professor of Energy Economics and Sustainability at the Hertie School of Governance in Berlin until 2019. She heads the Energy, Transportation, and Environment department at the German Institute for Economic Research (DIW Berlin).

== Early life and education ==
Kemfert was born in Delmenhorst, West Germany. She studied Economics at the Bielefeld University, the University of Oldenburg, where she graduated in 1998. After graduating, she held a post-doctoral research visit at the Fondazione Eni Enrico Mattei (FEEM) in Milan in 1998.

== Career ==
Following her post-doc, from January 1999 to April 2000, Kemfert led a research group at the Institute for Rational Application of Energies at the University of Stuttgart. As a guest professor, she taught at the University of St. Petersburg (2003–2004), University of Moscow (2000–2001) and University of Siena (1998, 2002–2003). From 2000 to 2004, Kemfert had a position as an assistant professor and was the leader of a research group at the University of Oldenburg. She has led the Energy, Transportation, and Environment department at the German Institute for Economic Research (DIW Berlin) since April 2004. From 2004 until 2009, she was a Professor for environmental economics at the Humboldt University Berlin.

== Other activities ==
Outside of academia, Kemfert served as shadow minister for energy policy in the campaigns of Norbert Röttgen (CDU) in North Rhine-Westphalia (2012) and of Thorsten Schäfer-Gümbel (SPD) in Hesse (2013).

In 2016, Kemfert was appointed by the Federal Ministry for the Environment, Nature Conservation, Building and Nuclear Safety as a member of the German Advisory Council on the Environment. She also advised President of the European Commission José Manuel Barroso in a high-level Group on Energy and Climate. Moreover, she acts as an external expert for the Intergovernmental Panel of Climate Change (IPCC). Kemfert was a member of the High Level Expert Group of the European Commissioner for the Environment and of the Advisory Group on Energy at the European Commission's Directorate-General for Research and Innovation. She also acts as a jury member for several significant sustainability prices.

In addition, Kemfert holds a variety of positions, including the following:

- 100 Prozent Erneuerbar Stiftung, Member of the Board of Trustees
- Austrian Institute of Economic Research (WIFO), Member of the International Board
- Club of Rome, Germany Chapter, Member of the Presidium (since 2011)
- Deutsche Umweltstiftung, Member of the Advisory Board
- Deutsches Museum, Member of the Board of Trustees
- Energie Campus Nürnberg (EnCN), Member of the Advisory Board
- Energy Research Centre of Lower Saxony (EFZN), Member of the Advisory Board
- Energy Watch Group (EWG), Member
- University of Konstanz, Member of the University Council 2002-2022,

== Political positioning ==
While Claudia Kempfert had run for office in 2012 with the CDU and in 2013 with the SPD, in 2023 the Neue Zürcher Zeitung pointed out Kempferts repeated support for the Green party in Germany. In the article, colleagues accused her of delivering the party with ammunition for the political debate. During the campaign for the 2021 German federal election, Kempfert praised the Greens program to fight climate change. In April 2023 she published a study for the Greens, justifying the german Nuclear power phase-out. In it, Kempfert concluded, that Nuclear power has always been among the most expensive forms of energy, unable to compete with prices for fossil or renewable forms of energy production. The study used investment projects in nuclear power, which had exceeded their budget, like the Olkiluoto Nuclear Power Plant, to support its findings, while projects, which stayed in budget, were widely ignored.

== Awards ==
Kemfert got an award from DAAD and was honoured in 2006 as top German Scientist from the German research foundation, Helmholtz and Leibniz Association ("Elf der Wissenschaft"). In 2011 she was awarded with the Urania Medaille as well as B.A.U.M. Environmental Award for Best Science and got the German-Solar-Award and the Adam-Smith-Award for Market-Based Environmental Policy in 2016.

=== Selected publications ===
- Kemfert, C. (2013): The battle about electricity: Myths, power and monopolies, Hamburg: Murmann
- Kemfert, C., Kunz, F., Rosellón, J. (2016): A Welfare Analysis of Electricity Transmission Planning in Germany. In: Energy Policy. 94 (2016), p. 446–452
- The European Electricity and climate policy – complement or substitute?. In: Environment and Planning / C 25 (2007), 1, S. 115–130, 2007
- Haftendorn, C., Holz, F., Kemfert, C. (2012): What about Coal? Interactions between Climate Policies and the Global Steam Coal Market until 2030. In: Energy Policy 48 (2012), pp. 274–283
- Traber, T., Kemfert, C. (2011): Gone with the Wind? Electricity Market Prices and Incentives to Invest in Thermal Power Plants under Increasing Wind Energy Supply. In: Energy Economics (2011), 2, pp. 249–256
- mit P. T. Truong und T. Brucker: Economic Impact Assessment of Climate Change: A Multi-Gas Investigation. In: The Energy Journal, Multi-Greenhouse Gas Mitigation and Climate Policy, Special Issue 3, S. 441–460, 2006
- Induced Technological Change in a Multi-Regional, Multi-Sectoral, Integrated Assessment Model (WIAGEM): Impact Assessment of Climate Policy Strategies. In: Special Issue of Ecological Economics, Vol. 54/2-3 S. 293–305, 2005
- International Climate Coalitions and trade – Assessment of cooperation incentives by issue linkage. In: Energy Policy, Vol. 32, Iss. 4, S. 455–465, 2004
- Global Economic Implications of alternative Climate Policy Strategies. In: Environmental Science and Policy, Vol. 5, Iss. 5, S. 367–384, 2002
