= Joint Energy Environment Projects =

Ugandan not-for-profit organization

- Formation: December 26, 1982; 43 years ago
- Founder: Ruth Kiwanuka
- Headquarters: Kyanja, Gayaza Road, Kampala
- Leader: Ruth Kiwanuka
- Website: jeepfolkecenter.org

Joint Energy Environment Projects (JEEP) is a Ugandan not-for-profit organization that was founded in 1983 by Ruth Kiwanuka after deforestation and soil erosion were identified as major threats to the health and welfare of Ugandans. JEEP's mission is to combat environmental destruction and conserve natural resources where they train and conduct awareness seminars on conservation. JEEP makes energy saving stove and do solar installations and uses a grassroots, practical approach and reaches out primarily to rural farmers.

== Field of expertise ==
JEEPS has its focus on adoption / Behavior Change, Capacity Building, Climate/Environment, Gender / Women's Empowerment, Humanitarian/Emergency Response, Livelihoods, Research, Marketing Awareness, Training & Extension, Tree Planting, Constructions and Promotion of Energy-Saving Stoves, Solar Energy.

== Other organizational expertise ==
JEEP has created Awareness on kitchen energy management to 16,000 people in 13 Districts, and also trained close to 16,000 people in construction of energy wood saving mud stoves in 15 districts. JEEP has created awareness of about 10 million people and built 49 institutional stoves in schools, hospitals, Prisons, Universities, and other institutions.

== Partnerships ==
JEEP is currently working with FAO Uganda, Nordic Folke center for renewable energy (see Preben Maegaard) and Energy North in Denmark on Environmental Conservation Projects.
