= World Council for Renewable Energy =

The World Council for Renewable Energy defends, develops, and promotes policies on the multinational, governmental, regional and individual levels in favor of the use of natural and renewable forms of energy to replace fossil and nuclear energy.

Hermann Scheer was the general chairman of the Council. He died in October 2010.

At their conference at Berlin in 2002, the Council adopted an "action plan for the Global Proliferation of Renewable Energy".

== See also ==
- 2002 in the environment
- Energy law
- Renewable energy
