= Bent Sørensen (physicist) =

Danish physicist (born 1941)

Bent Erik Sørensen
- Born: 13 October 1941 (age 84)
- Occupation: Physicist

Bent Erik Sørensen (born 13 October 1941), is a Danish physicist, distinguished mainly by research into future forms of renewable energy. He is currently professor emeritus in the Department of Environmental, Social and Spatial Change in Roskilde University, Denmark, and president of Novator Advanced Technology Consulting.

== Biography ==
Sørensen gained his MSc in physics and mathematics in 1965 and was awarded a PhD in 1974 by the Niels Bohr Institute in Copenhagen, where he worked until 1980, when he became professor at Roskilde University. He has undertaken sabbatical appointments in Japan, France, USA and Australia and has presented at numerous international events.

He received the Australian Government Award for Eminent European Scientists in 1982 and the European Solar Prize in 2002. In 1989, he was knighted by Queen Margrethe II of Denmark.

== Publications ==
Sørensen has published over five hundred articles, reports and papers, and has written a number of books, including:

- Johannes Jensen; Bent Sørensen (1984). Fundamentals of energy storage. Wiley. ISBN 978-0-471-08604-8.
- Bent Sørensen; Paul Breeze (29 December 2008). Renewable Energy Focus Handbook. Academic Press. ISBN 978-0-12-374705-1.
- Bent Sørensen (7 November 2007). Renewable Energy Conversion, Transmission, and Storage. Academic Press. ISBN 978-0-12-374262-9.
- Bent Sørensen (19 November 2010). Renewable Energy: Physics, Engineering, Environmental Impacts, Economics & Planning. Academic Press. ISBN 978-0-12-375025-9.
- Bent Sorensen (6 June 2011). Life-Cycle Analysis of Energy Systems: From Methodology to Applications. Royal Society of Chemistry. ISBN 978-1-84973-145-4.
- Bent Sorensen (Sorensen) (15 November 2011). Hydrogen and Fuel Cells: Emerging Technologies and Applications. Academic Press. ISBN 978-0-12-396503-5.
- Bent Sørensen (2011). Renewable Energy: Renewable energy technologies II. Earthscan. ISBN 978-1-84407-867-7.
- Bent Sorensen (17 January 2012). A History of Energy: Northern Europe from the Stone Age to the Present Day. Taylor & Francis. ISBN 978-1-84971-384-9.

== See also ==
- List of people associated with renewable energy
