= Eurosolar =

- Europäische Vereinigung für Erneuerbare Energien e.V.
- Abbreviation: Eurosolar
- Formation: 2 August 1988; 38 years ago
- Founded at: Bonn, Germany
- Purpose: To replace nuclear and fossil-fuel energy entirely using renewable energy
- Headquarters: Bonn, Germany
- Chair: Peter Droege
- Managing director: Steffen Otzipka
- Website: www.eurosolar.de/en/

Eurosolar - European Association for Renewable Energies (own spelling: EUROSOLAR) is a German association with headquarters in Bonn. The association has sections in 13 countries (Germany, Bulgaria, Denmark, Georgia, Italy, Luxembourg, Austria, Russia, Spain, Czech Republic, Turkey, Ukraine and Hungary).

Eurosolar is the non-profit European Association for Renewable Energy (German: Europäische Vereinigung für Erneuerbare Energien) that conducts its work independently of political parties, institutions, commercial enterprises, and interest groups. Eurosolar develops and encourages political and economic action plans and concepts for the introduction of renewable energy. Eurosolar has approximately 2,500 members, close to 400 legal groups, and owns the Solar Age magazine, published quarterly. A history of the association is available.

Formed on 2 August 1988 in Bonn, West Germany, Eurosolar runs an annual event called the Solar Prize awards, rewarding progress in renewable energy.

== Gallery ==
Renewable Energies Logo by Melanie Maecker-Tursun

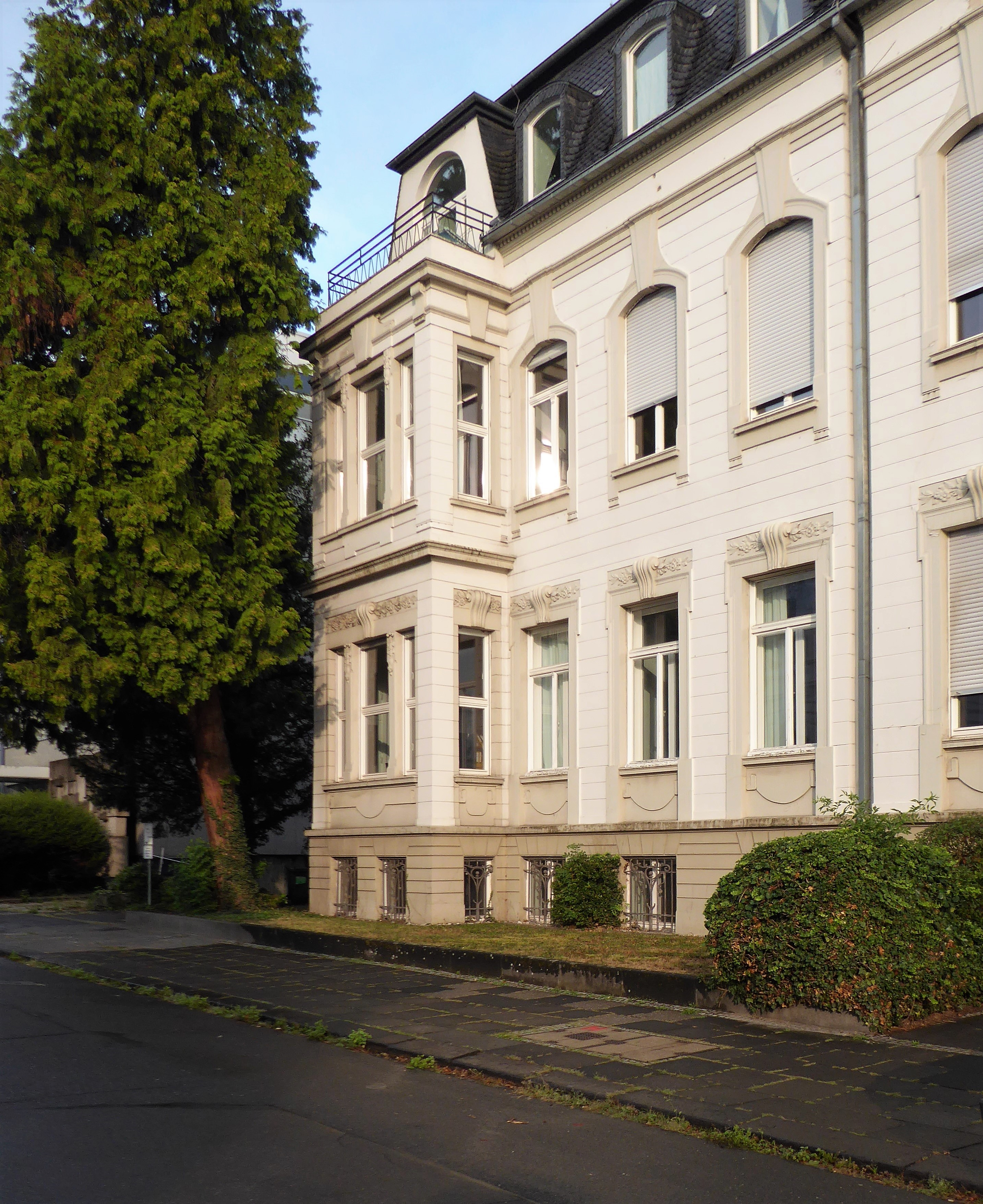
Eurosolar office in Bonn (2018)

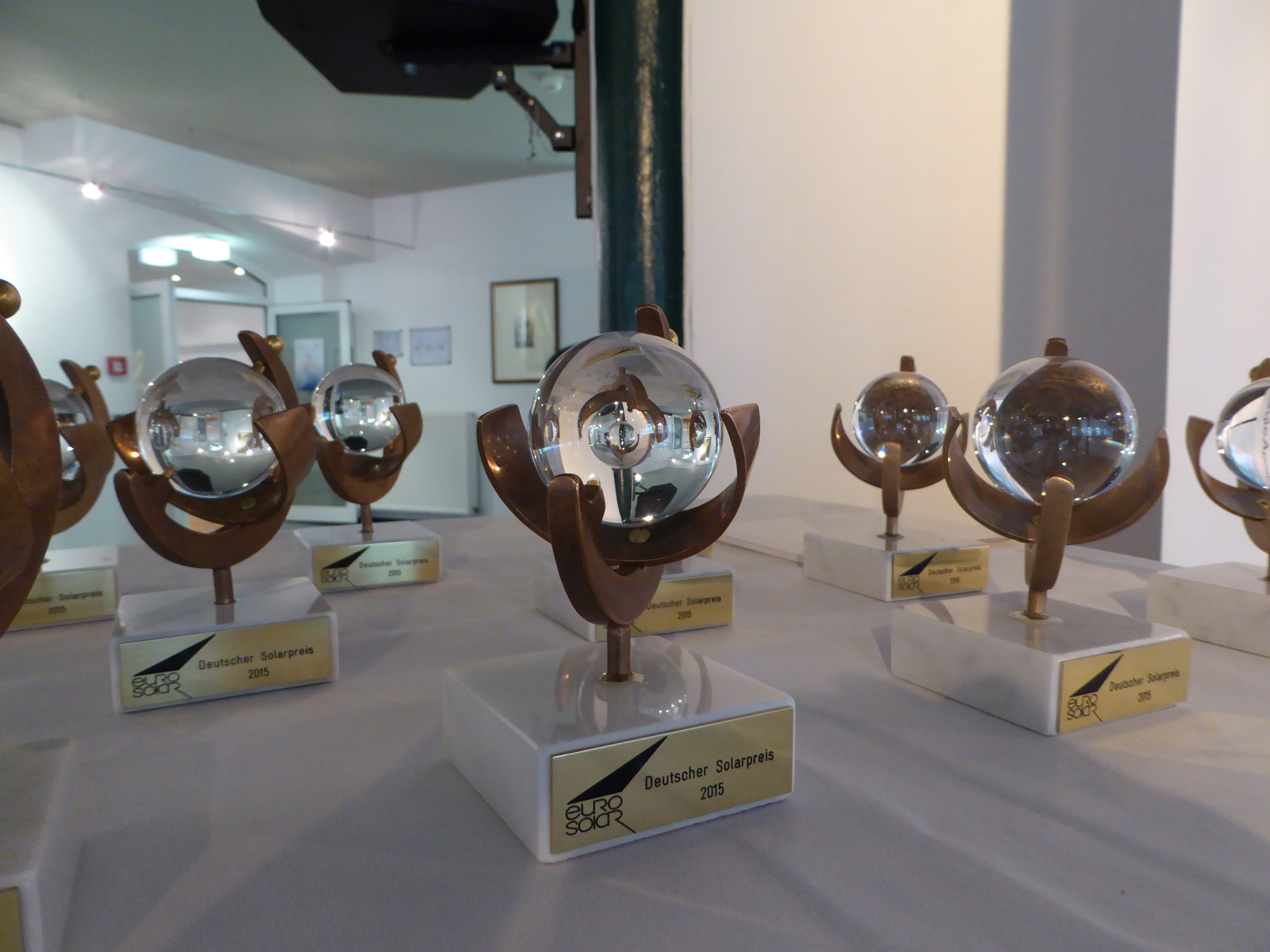
German Solar Prize 2015

== See also ==
- Hermann Scheer, former president
- German Renewable Energy Sources Act, Eurosolar was active during its inception in 1991 and subsequent development
- International Solar Alliance
