= Energiewende =

Ongoing energy transition in Germany

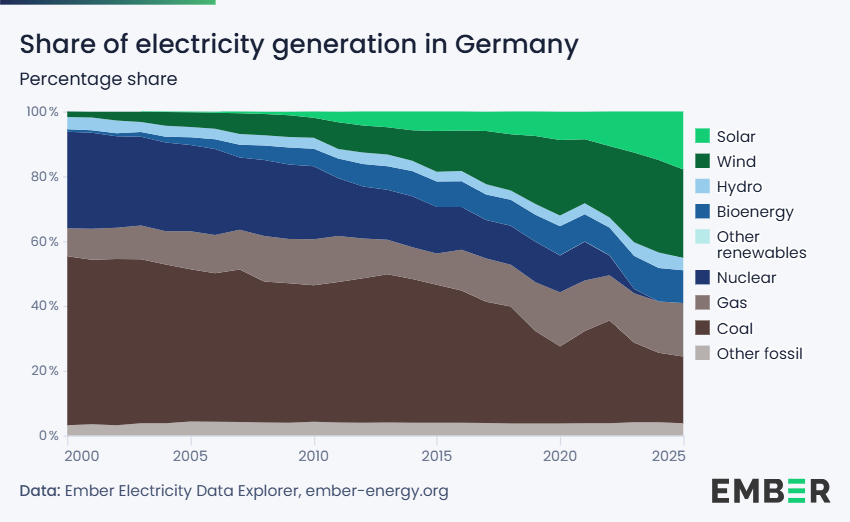
Share of electricity generation in Germany - percentage share

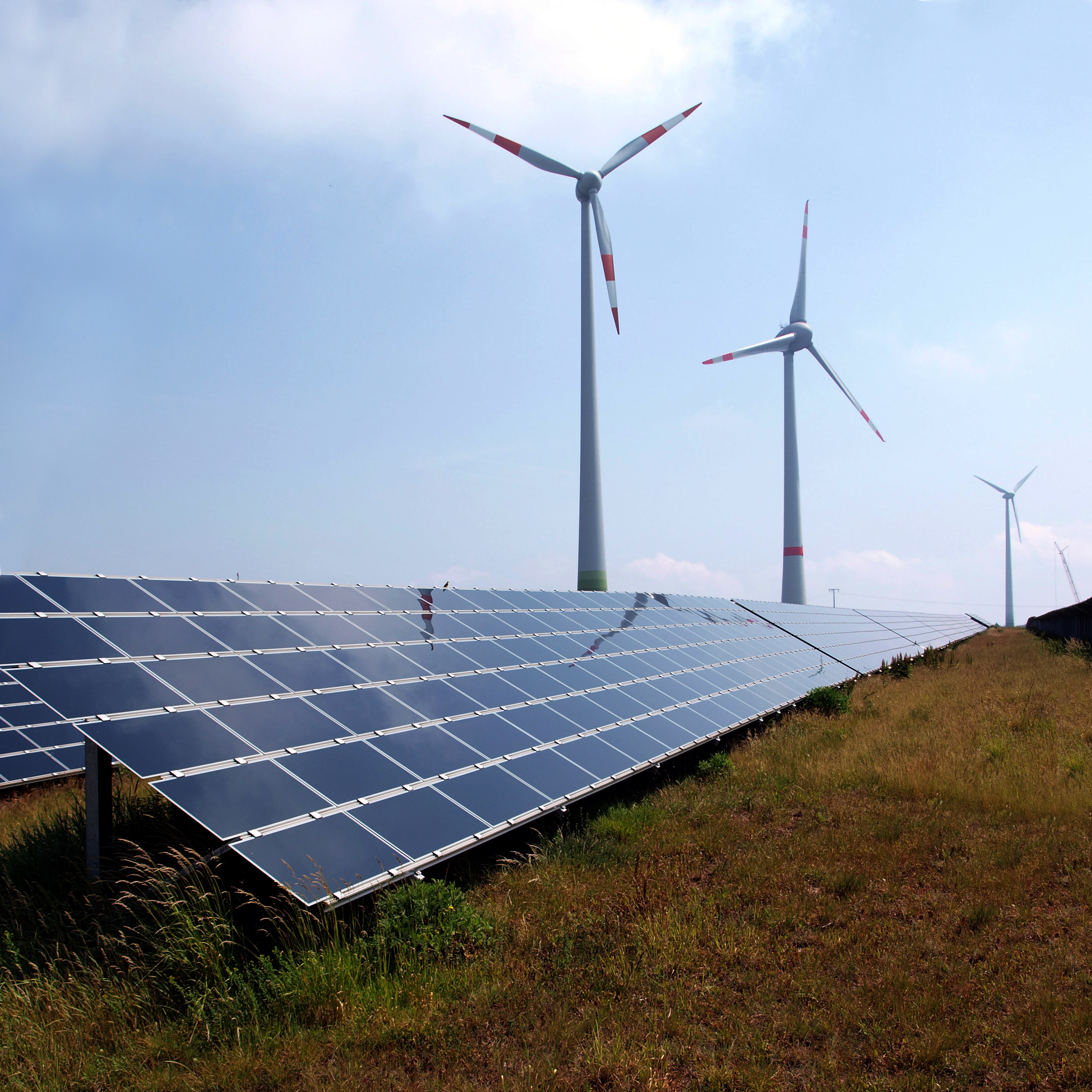
Photovoltaic array and wind turbines at the Schneebergerhof wind farm in the German state of Rheinland-Pfalz

The Energiewende (German for 'energy turnaround') (pronounced [ʔenɐˈɡiːˌvɛndə]) is the ongoing energy transition by Germany. The new system intends to rely heavily on renewable energy (particularly wind, photovoltaics, and hydroelectricity), energy efficiency, and energy demand management.

Legislative support for the Energiewende was passed in late 2010 and included greenhouse gas (GHG) reductions of 80–95% by 2050 (relative to 1990) and a renewable energy target of 60% by 2050. Germany had made progress on its GHG emissions reduction target before the introduction of the program, achieving a 27% decrease between 1990 and 2014. The country would need to maintain an average GHG emissions abatement rate of 3.5% per year to reach its Energiewende goal, equal to the maximum historical value. Germany's energy mix has a high CO_{2} intensity due a significant coal and fossil gas usage.

Germany phased out nuclear power in 2023 as part of the Energiewende, and plans to retire existing coal power plants possibly by 2030, and latest by 2038. By 2023 the early retirement of the country's nuclear power plants was no longer supported by the general public and the plan was controversial among energy experts, fearing that it could have a negative impact on Germany's goals to reduce greenhouse gas emissions.

== Etymology ==
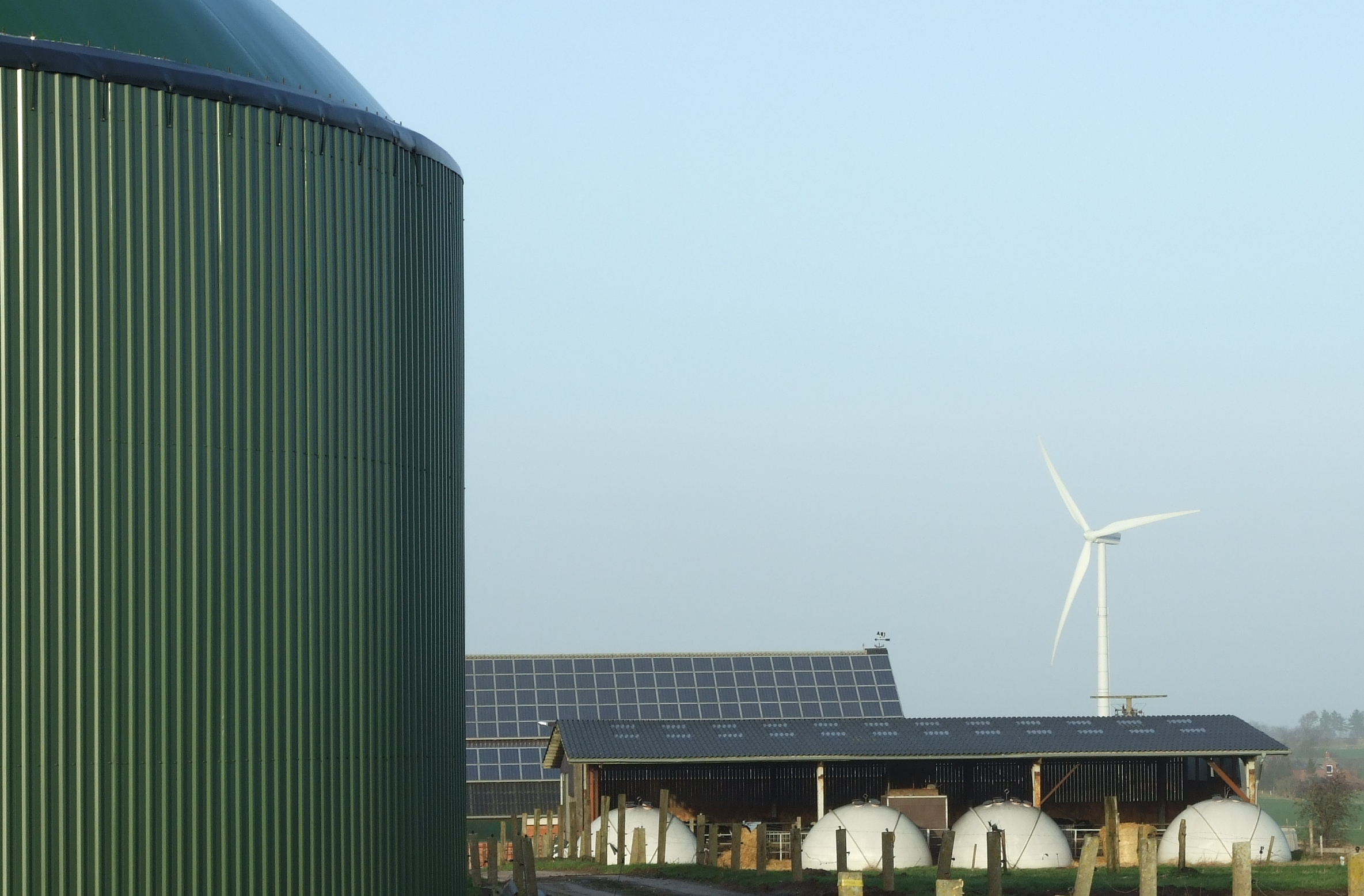
The main renewable energy sources in Germany: biomass, wind energy, and photovoltaics

The term Energiewende is regularly used in English language publications without being translated (a loanword).

The term Energiewende was first contained in the title of a 1980 publication by Öko-Institut, calling for the complete abandonment of nuclear and petroleum energy. The most groundbreaking claim was that economic growth was possible without increased energy consumption. On 16 February 1980, the German Federal Ministry of the Environment hosted a symposium in Berlin called Energiewende: Atomausstieg und Klimaschutz (Energy Transition: Nuclear Phase-Out and Climate Protection). The Öko-Institut was funded by environmental and religious organizations, and the importance of religious and conservative figures like Wolf von Fabeck and Peter Ahmels were crucial. In the following decades, the term Energiewende expanded in scope; in its present form, it dates back to 2002.

Energiewende designated a significant change in energy policy. The term encompassed a reorientation of policy from demand to supply and a shift from centralized to distributed generation (for example, producing heat and power in small co-generation units), which replace overproduction and avoidable energy consumption with energy-saving measures and increased efficiency.

In a broader sense, the transition also entailed a democratization of energy. In the traditional energy industry, a few companies with large centralized power stations were perceived as dominating the market as an oligopoly and consequently amassing a worrisome level of both economic and political power. Renewable energies can be established in a decentralized manner. Public wind farms and solar parks can involve many citizens directly in energy production. Photovoltaic systems can be set up by individuals. Municipal utilities can also benefit citizens financially, while the conventional energy industry profits from a relatively small number of shareholders. The decentralized structure of renewable energies, enables the creation of value locally and minimizes capital outflows from a region. Renewable energy sources, play an important role in municipal energy policy, and local governments promote the sources.

== Status ==
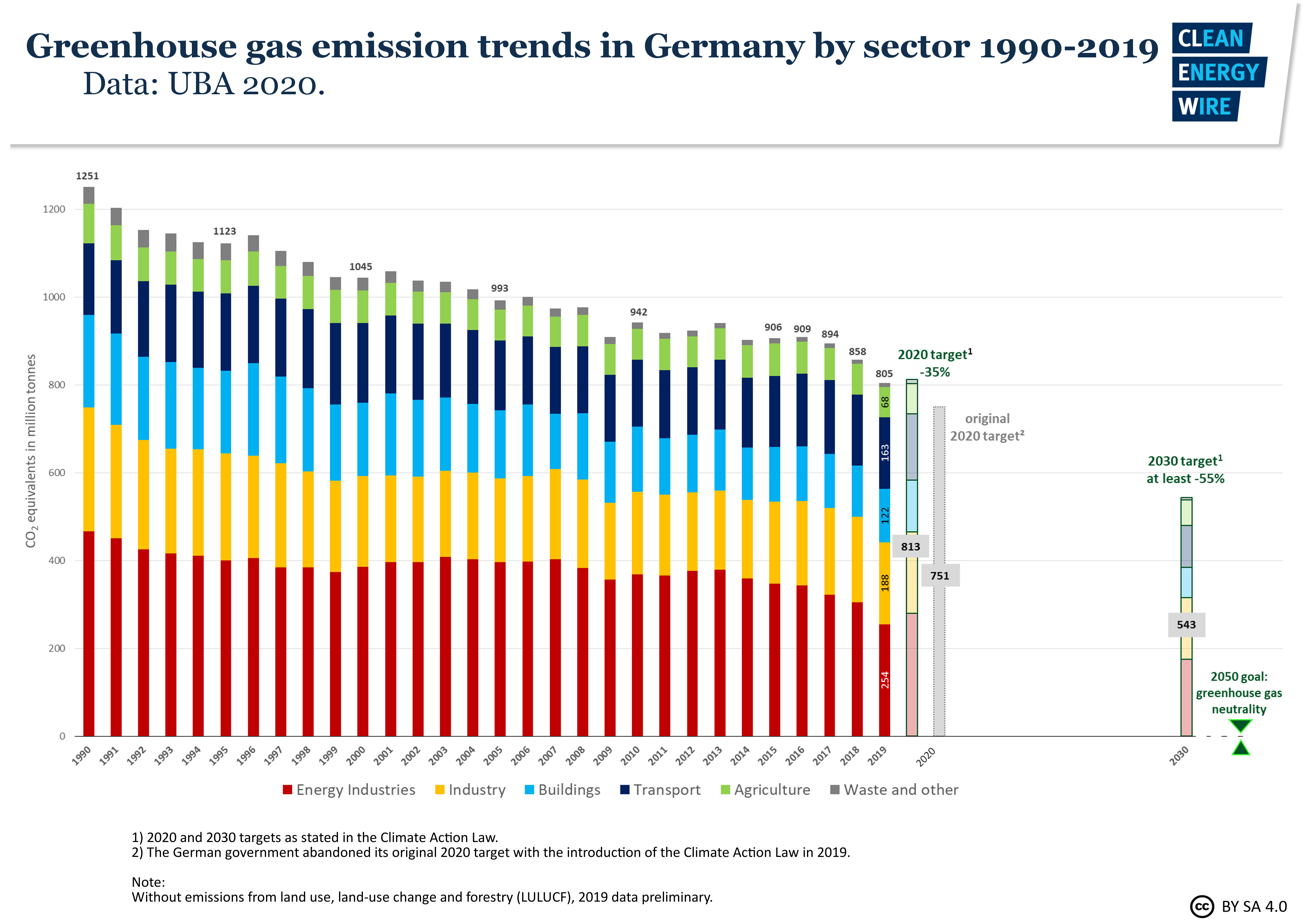

The policy document outlining the Energiewende was published by the German government in September 2010, six months before the Fukushima nuclear accident. Legislative support was passed in September 2010. On 6 June 2011, following Fukushima, the government removed the use of nuclear power as a bridging technology as part of their policy. The program was later described as "Germany's vendetta against nuclear" and attributed to the influence of ideologically anti-nuclear green movements in politics. In 2014, then-Federal Minister for Economic Affairs and Energy Sigmar Gabriel lobbied Swedish company Vattenfall to continue investments in brown coal mines in Germany, explaining that "we cannot simultaneously quit nuclear energy and coal-based power generation." James Hansen reports that Gabriel argued in June 2008 that "coal use was essential because Germany was going to phase out nuclear power. Period. It was a political decision, and it was non-negotiable".

In 2011, the Ethical Committee on Secure Energy Supply was tasked with assessing the feasibility of the nuclear phase-out and transition to renewable energy, and it concluded:

The Ethics Committee is firmly convinced that the phase-out of nuclear energy can be completed within a decade using the energy transition measures presented here.

— Deutschlands Energiewende. Ein Gemeinschaftswerk für die Zukunft, Ethik‐Kommission Sichere Energieversorgung

In 2019, Germany's Federal Court of Auditors determined the program had cost €160 billion over the last 5 years and criticized the expenses for being "in extreme disproportion to the results." Despite widespread initial support, the program is perceived as "expensive, chaotic, and unfair", and a "massive failure" as of 2019.

Russian fossil gas was perceived as a "safe, cheap, and temporary" fuel to replace nuclear power in the initial phase of Energiewende as part of the German policy of integrating Russia with the European Union through mutually beneficial trade relations. German dependency on Russian gas imports was presented as "mutual dependency."

=== Initial phase 2013–2016 ===
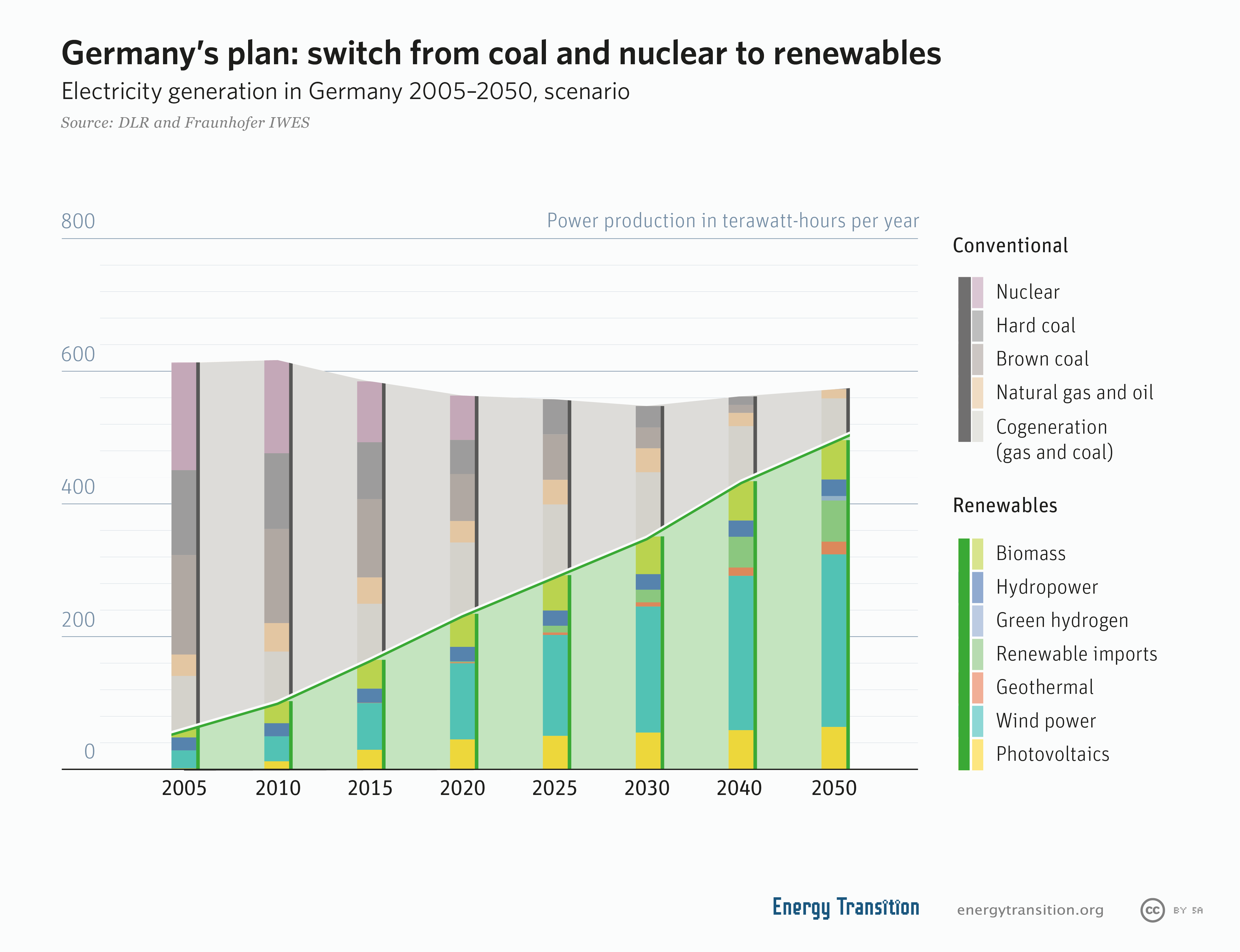
Energy transition scenario in Germany from 2012

After the 2013 federal elections, the new Christian Democratic Union of Germany (CDU) /Christian Social Union in Bavaria (CSU) and Social Democratic Party of Germany (SPD) coalition government continued the Energiewende, with minor modification of its goals in the coalition agreement. The coalition government introduced an intermediate target of a 55–60% share of renewable energy in gross electricity consumption in 2035. The targets were described as "ambitious". The Berlin-based policy institute Agora Energiewende noted that "while the German approach is not unique worldwide, the speed and scope of the Energiewende are exceptional". A characteristic of the Energiewende compared to other planned energy transitions was the expectation that the transition is driven by citizens and not large energy utilities. Germany's switch to renewable energy was described as "democratization of the energy supply". The Energiewende also sought a greater transparency in relation to national energy policy formation.

As of 2013, Germany was spending €1.5 billion per year on energy research to solve the technical and social issues raised by the transition, which are provided by the individual federal states, universities, and the government, which provided €400 million per year. The Government's contribution was increased to €800 million in 2017.

Important aspects included (as of November 2016):

Energiewende policy targets and status as of 2016
Target	2016	2020	2030	2040	2050
Greenhouse gas emissions
Greenhouse gas emissions (the base year 1990)	−27.3%	−40%	−55%	−70%	−80 to −95%
Renewable energy
Share of gross final energy consumption	14.8%	18%	30%	45%	60%
Share of gross electricity consumption	31.6%	35%	50%	65%	80%
Share of heat consumption	13.2%	14%			
Share in the transport sector	6.9%	10%	14%		
Efficiency and consumption
Primary energy consumption (the base year 2008)	−6.5%	−20%			−50%
Final energy productivity (2008–2050)	1.1% per year (2008–2016)	2.1% per year (2008–2050)			
Gross electricity consumption (the base year 2008)	−3.6%	−10%			−25%
Primary energy consumption in buildings (the base year 2008)	−18.3%				−80%
Heat consumption in buildings (base year 2008)	−6.3%	−20%			
Final energy consumption in transport (base year 2005)	4.2%	−10%			−40%

In addition, there was an associated research and development drive. A chart showing German energy legislation in 2016 is available.

The targets went beyond European Union legislation and the national policies of other European states. The policy objectives have been embraced by the German Federal Government and has resulted in an expansion of renewable energy, particularly wind power. Germany's share of renewables has increased from around 5% in 1999 to 22.9% in 2012, surpassing the OECD average of 18% usage of renewables. Producers have been guaranteed a fixed feed-in tariff for 20 years, guaranteeing a fixed income. Energy co-operatives have been created, and efforts were made to decentralize control and profits. Poor investment designs have caused bankruptcies and low returns, and unrealistic promises have been shown to be far from reality.

Nuclear power plants were closed, and the existing nine plants were scheduled to close earlier than planned, in 2022.

A factor that inhibited efficient employment of new renewable energy has been the lack of an accompanying investment in power infrastructure to bring the power to market. It is believed 8,300 km (5,200 mi) of power lines must be built or upgraded. In 2010 legislation has been passed seeking construction and upgrade of 7,700 km (4,800 mi) of new grid lines, 950 km (590 mi) have been built by 2019—and in 2017, 30 km (19 mi) has been built.

The German States have varying attitudes to the construction of new power lines. Industry has had their rates frozen and the increased costs of the Energiewende had been passed on to consumers, who have had rising electricity bills. Germans in 2013 had the highest electricity prices (including taxes) in Europe. In comparison, its neighbours (Poland, Sweden, Denmark and nuclear-reliant France) have some of the lowest costs (excluding taxes) in the EU.

On 1 August 2014, a revised Renewable Energy Sources Act entered into force. Deployment corridors stipulated the extent to renewable energy to be expanded in the future and the funding rates (feed-in tariffs) will no longer be fixed by the government, but will be determined by auction.

Market redesign was perceived as a key part of the Energiewende. The German electricity market needed to be reworked to suit. Wind and solar power cannot be principally refinanced under the current marginal cost based market. Carbon pricing is also central to the Energiewende, and the European Union Emissions Trading Scheme (EU ETS) needs to be reformed to create a genuine scarcity of certificates. The German Federal Government is calling for a reform. Most of the computer scenarios used to analyse the Energiewende rely on a substantial carbon price to drive the transition to low-carbon technologies.

Coal-fired generation needs to be retired as part of the Energiewende. Some argue for an explicit negotiated phase-out of coal plants, along the lines of the well-publicized nuclear phase-out, but as German minister of economy noted, "we cannot shut down both our nuclear and coal-fired power plants". Coal comprised 42% of electricity generation in 2015. A phase-out of fossil fuels together with a shift to 100% renewable energy is required by about 2040.

The Energiewende is made up of various building blocks and assumptions. Electricity storage was hoped to become a useful technology in the future. As of 2019, a number of potential storage projects (power-to-gas, hydrogen storage and others) are still in prototype phase with losses up to 40% of the stored energy in the existing small scale installations.

Energy efficiency plays a key but under-recognised role. Energy efficiency is one of Germany's targets. Integration with national electricity networks can offer benefits. Systems with high shares of renewables can use geographical diversity to offset intermittency.

Germany invested €1.5 billion in energy research in 2013. The German Federal Government spent €820 million supporting projects ranging from basic research to applications. The federal government also foresees an export role for German expertise in the area.

The social and political dimensions of the Energiewende have been subject to study. Sebastian Strunz argues that the underlying technological, political and economic structures will need to change radically—a process He calls "regime shift". Eva Schmid, Brigitte Knopf, and Anna Pechan analyze the actors and institutions that will be decisive in the Energiewende and how latency in the national electricity infrastructure may restrict progress.

On 3 December 2014, the German Federal Government released its National Action Plan on Energy Efficiency (NAPE) in order to improve the uptake of energy efficiency. The areas covered are the energy efficiency of buildings, energy conservation for companies, consumer energy efficiency, and transport energy efficiency. Under the plan, the Federal Government expects the German industry and business sectors to make a sizeable contribution to these national energy-saving targets.

An official Federal Government report on progress under the Energiewende, notes:

- energy consumption fell by 4.7% in 2014 (from 2013) and at 13132 petajoules reached its lowest level since 1990
- renewable generation is the number-one source of electricity
- energy efficiency increased by an average annual 1.6% between 2008 and 2014
- final energy consumption in the transport sector was 1.7% higher in 2014 than in 2005
- for the first time in more than ten years, electricity prices for household customers fell at the beginning of 2015

A commentary on the progress report expands on many of the issues raised.

=== Slowdown from 2016 ===
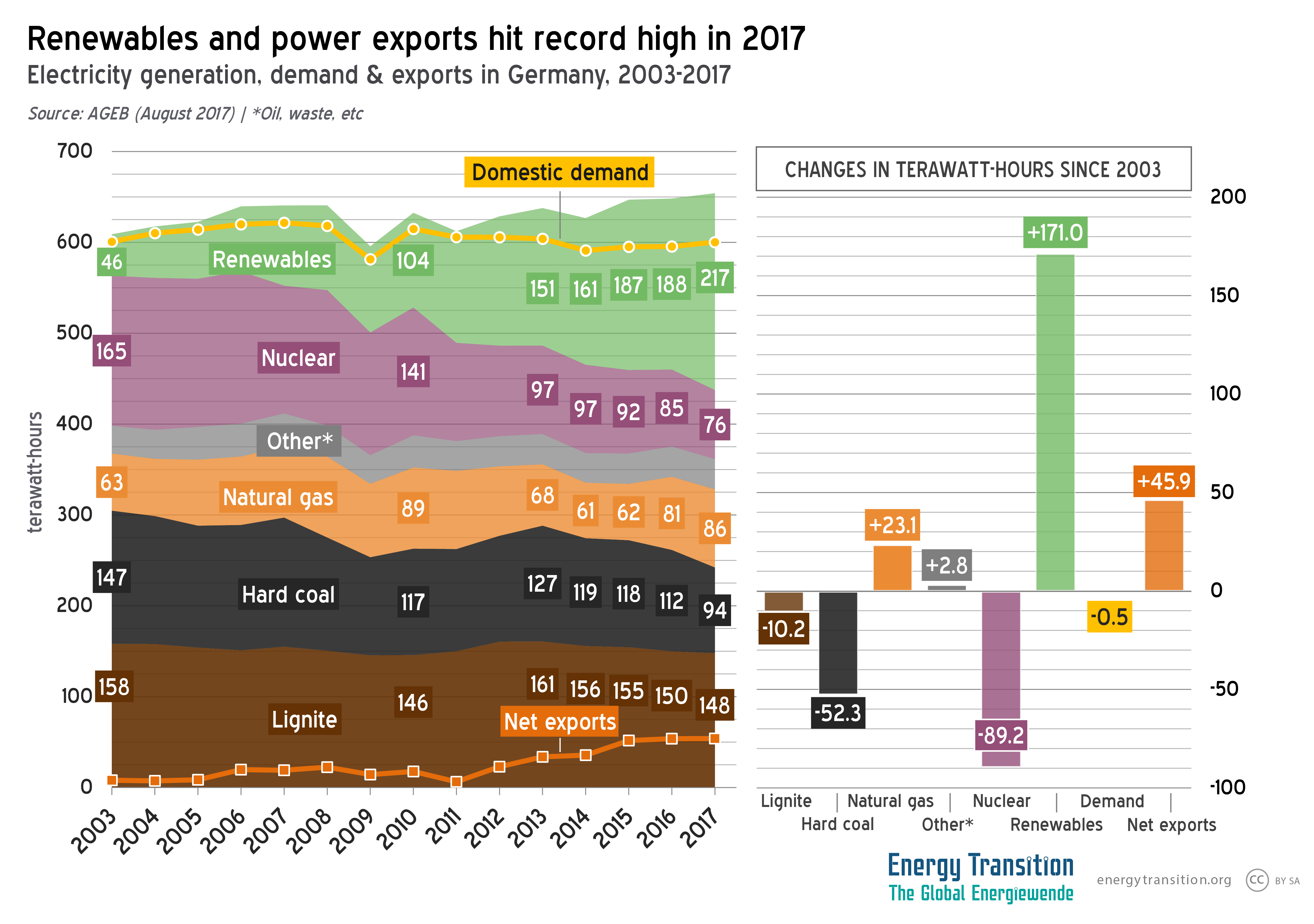
Electricity generation, demands and exports in Germany, 2003–2017

Slow progress on transmission network reinforcement had led to a deferment of new windfarms in northern Germany. The German cabinet approved costly underground cabling in October 2015 in a bid to dispel local resistance against above-ground pylons and to speed up the expansion process.

Development of carbon dioxide emissions

Analysis by Agora Energiewende in late-2016 suggests that Germany will probably miss several of its key Energiewende targets, despite recent reforms to the Renewable Energy Sources Act and the wholesale electricity market. The goal to cut emissions by 40% by 2020 "will most likely be missed ... if no further measures are taken" and the 55–60% share of renewable energy in gross electricity consumption by 2035 is "unachievable" with the current plans for renewables expansion. In November 2016, Agora Energiewende reported on the impact of the EEG (2017) and several other related new laws. It concludes that the new legislation will bring "fundamental changes" for large sections of the energy industry, but have limited effect on the economy and on consumers.

The 2016 Climate Action Plan for Germany, adopted on 14 November 2016, introduced sector targets for greenhouse gas (GHG) emissions. The goal for the energy sector is shown in the table. The plan states that the energy supply must be "almost completely decarbonised" by 2050, with renewable energy as its main source. For the electricity sector, "in the long-term, electricity generation must be based almost entirely on renewable energies" and "the share of wind and solar power in total electricity production will rise significantly". Notwithstanding, during the transition, "less carbon-intensive natural gas power plants and the existing most modern coal power plants play an important role as interim technologies".

Sector targets for greenhouse gas emission reductions for 2030
Sector	1990	2014	2030	Reduction (2030 relative 1990)
Energy	466	358	175–183	61–62%
Buildings	209	119	70–72	66–67%
Transport	163	160	95–98	40–42%
Industry	283	181	140–143	49–51%
Agriculture	88	72	58–61	31–34%
Other	39	12	5	87%
Total	1248	902	543–562	55–56%
Units: million tonnes CO_{2}eq.; 1990 and 2014 values are actual.

The fifth monitoring report on the Energiewende for 2015 was published in December 2016. The expert commission which wrote the report warns that Germany will probably miss its 2020 climate targets and believes that this could threaten the credibility of the entire endeavour. The commission puts forward a number of measures to address the slowdown, including a flat national CO_{2} price imposed across all sectors, a greater focus on transport, and full market exposure for renewable generation. Regarding the carbon price, the commission thinks that a reformed EU ETS would be better, but that achieving agreement across Europe is unlikely.

=== After 2017 ===
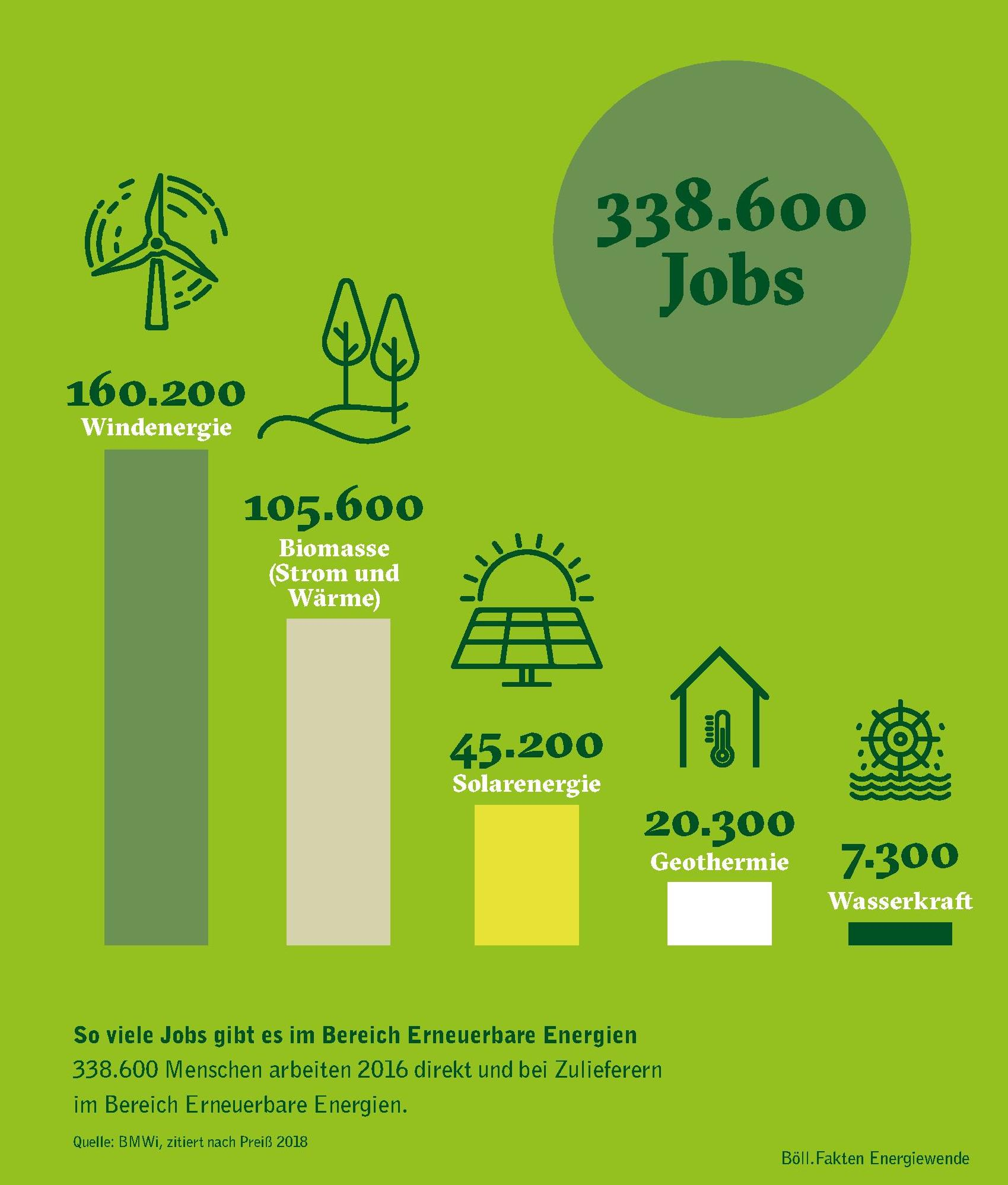
Jobs in the renewable energy sector in Germany in 2018

Since 2017, it had become clear that the Energiewende was not progressing at the anticipated speed, with the country's climate policy regarded as "lackluster" and the energy transition "stalling". High electricity prices, growing resistance against the use of wind turbines over their environmental and potential health impacts, and regulatory hurdles, have been identified as causes for the slowdown. As of 2017 Germany imported more than half of its energy.

A 2018 European Commission case study report on the Energiewende noted 27% decrease in CO_{2} emissions against the 1990 levels with a slight increase over the few preceding years and concluded achieving of the intended 40% reduction target by 2020 in unfeasible, primarily due to the "simultaneous nuclear phase-out and increased energy consumption". 50% increase of electricity prices was observed (compared to base 2007 prices). Germany's energy sector remains the largest single source of CO_{2} emissions, contributing over 40%.

In 2018 the slow-down of deployment of new renewable energy was partially attributed to high demand for land, which has been highlighted as a potential "downside" by a WWF report.

In March 2019, Chancellor Merkel formed a "climate cabinet" to find a consensus on new emissions reduction measures to meet 2030 targets. The result was the Climate Action Program 2030, which Berlin adopted on 9 October 2019. The Program contains plans for a carbon pricing system for the heating and transportation sectors, which are not covered by the EU ETS. It includes tax and other incentives to encourage energy-efficient building renovations, higher EV subsidies, and more public transport investments. The IEA report concludes that "[t]he package represents a clear step in the right direction towards Germany meeting its 2030 targets." The German Coal Commission, composed of 28 industrial, environmental, and regional organizations, voted on the coal phase-out date. 27 members voted in favor of the 2038 coal phase-out date, with only one regional organization from Lusatia voting against, and Greenpeace voting in favor and later releasing a non-binding "dissenting opinion".

As result of phasing out nuclear power and, in long term, coal, Germany declared increased reliance on fossil gas.

We will have phased out nuclear energy by 2022. We have a very difficult problem, namely that almost the only sources of energy that will be able to provide baseload power are coal and lignite. Naturally, we cannot do without baseload energy. Natural gas will therefore play a greater role for another few decades. I believe we would be well advised to admit that if we phase out coal and nuclear energy then we have to be honest and tell people that we'll need more natural gas.

— Angela Merkel, Speech at 49th World Economic Forum Annual Meeting in Davos on 23 January 2019

A similar statement was voiced by SPD MP Udo Bullmann who explained that Germany has to stick with fossil fuels as it is trying to replace both coal and nuclear "at the same time", while countries that rely on nuclear power have "easier task replacing fossil fuels". In 2020 Agora Energiewende also declared a number of new fossil gas plants will be also required to "guarantee supply security as Germany relies more and more on intermittent renewable electricity". In January 2019, Germany's Economy Minister Peter Altmaier did not want to import "cheap nuclear power" from other countries to compensate for planned phase-out of coal. In 2021 Green MEP Sven Giegold admitted that Germany may require new fossil gas power plants in order to "stabilise the more fluctuating power supply of renewables".

In the late 2010s, there starts to be a significant decline in the use of (brown) coal and therefore in emissions.

The 2020 climate goals were successful in the following areas:

- closure of nuclear plants
- increasing renewable energy share
- reducing greenhouse gas emissions

The following climate goals failed:

- increasing renewable energy share in the transport sector
- reducing primary energy consumption
- final energy productivity.

In 2020, a number of previously shut down fossil gas plants (Irsching units 4 and 5) were restarted due to "heavy fluctuations of level of power generated from the wind and sun" and a new fossil gas power plant was announced by RWE near the former Biblis nuclear power plant shut down in 2017. The project is declared as part of "decarbonization plan" where renewable energy capacity is accompanied by fossil gas plants to cover for intermittency. In 2020, a new coal power plant unit, Datteln 4, was also connected to the grid. A new fossil gas power plant will be also opened from 2023 in Leipheim, Bavaria to compensate for loss of power caused by "nuclear exit" in the Region. In 2021, the planned decommissioning of Heyden 4 coal power plant was cancelled and the plant remains online to compensate for shutdown of the Grohnde nuclear power station. In 2022, another coal power plant was restarted in Schongau, Bavaria, for the same reasons.

In June 2021, professor André Thess from Stuttgart university published an open letter accusing Klaus Töpfer and Matthias Kleiner, the authors of the 2011 Ethical Committee for Secure Energy Supply report that served as the scientific background of the "nuclear exit" decision, of disregarding the basic rules of scientific independence. The analysis promised that phase-out of nuclear energy and full transition to renewable energy "can be completed within a decade". Thess highlighted that the authors lacked the expertise necessary to properly understand and "balance between the risk of more rapid climate change without nuclear energy and the risk of slower climate change with nuclear energy".

High average amounts of wind in 2019 and 2020 were presented in Germany as a success of renewable energy, but when the amount of wind was low for the first half of 2021, use of coal rose by 21% as compared to the previous years. In the first half of 2021 coal, gas, and nuclear power delivered 56% of overall electricity in Germany, with proportionally higher CO_{2} intensity due to high inputs from coal and fossil gas. According to another analysis by Oekomoderne, in 2021, Germany produced nearly 260 TWh of electricity from coal in the first half of 2021, making it the single largest source of energy in that period—as it used "one billion tons" of coal.

The situation once again raised questions about the future of weather-dependent electricity system that is dependent on fossil energy for stability and its contradiction with the initial objectives of decarbonization.

Projections Report published in 2021 predicted that Germany will miss its 2030 target by 16% (49% reduction vs 65% planned) and the 2040 target by 21% (67% vs 88% planned). Reduction of emissions in other sectors of the economy is also expected to miss the original targets.

In October 2021, over 20 climate scientists and activists signed an open letter to the German Government to reconsider the nuclear exit as it will lead to emissions of an extra 60 million tons of CO_{2} each year and hinder decarbonization efforts even further.

The new coalition formed after the 2021 elections proposed earlier phase-out of coal and internal combustion cars by 2035, 65% energy generated from renewables by 2030 and 80% by 2040. In addition, 2% of land surface is to be set aside for on-shore wind power, and off-shore wind capacity is to be increased to 75 GW. Fossil gas role was reinforced as "indispensable" transition fuel with low-carbon nuclear power imported from France to ensure stability of supplies.

Throughout the year 2021, the single largest source of electricity in Germany was coal (30.2%), an increase of 24.9% compared to 2020 due to a significant drop in wind (−13.3%) and solar (−0.5%) power output in that year. Solar power produced 8.7% electricity, while nuclear power produced 12.6% as it was going through the process of decommissioning.

In 2022, Agora Energiewende warned that Germany has missed its 2020 emission targets and is likely going to miss the 2030 targets, and increase of total emissions after 2022 is likely. Previously celebrated 2020 record low emissions were described as one-off effect of favorable weather and lower demand due to COVID-19 pandemics. Nuclear phase-out, skyrocketing gas prices, and low wind and solar output resulting in increased reliance on coal were also attributed to the increase in emissions.

In January 2022 the new coalition government reiterated its opposition to the inclusion of nuclear power in the EU sustainable taxonomy, but also requested that fossil gas is instead included as a "transitional" fuel and carbon intensity thresholds for gas are relaxed. As the subsidies for gas were upheld, a number of new fossil gas plants plan to benefit from the subsidies, while expecting increased profits thanks to "rising wholesale electricity prices" as result of "the last nuclear power plants to be removed from the grid" at the same time.

In 2023, Germany achieved its lowest greenhouse gas emissions since the 1950s with a 20% reduction, largely impacted by a decline in industrial production due to economic factors like the Ukraine war and high energy prices. The Berlin-based think-tank Agora Energiewende attributed approximately half of the reduction to decreased coal-fired power generation, while only 15% resulted from technological improvements such as enhanced renewable energy utilization. Despite these gains, with over 50% of Germany's electricity now derived from renewable energy, concerns persist about the industrial sector's competitiveness and sustainability, as emission levels in construction and transport have not changed, putting Germany at risk of missing its EU emission targets.

=== Post-2022 ===
Following the 2022 Russian invasion of Ukraine, Germany announced it would re-open 10 GW of coal power to allegedly "conserve natural gas" following the shortage in Europe. This led to a subsequent criticism of Energiewende's strategy, and how this impacted different countries in Europe. Michael Kretschmer (CDU) declared the Energiewende to be a failure, highlighting that renewable generation is insufficient and baseload capabilities have reached their limits. He called for nuclear power phase-out to be cancelled and remaining reactors restarted, until a new feasible strategy is created.

From February 2022, there was a heated debate about pausing the nuclear phase-out and restarting still operational reactors in order to better cope with the energy crisis caused by the Russian invasion of Ukraine. In August 2022, German counter-intelligence started an investigation into two high-ranked officials at German ministry of energy suspected of representing interests of Russia.

In October 2022, Germany ministry of energy approved extension of RWE brown coal open pit mine in Lutzerath, claiming it is "necessary for energy security". In October 2022, the Government also declared the operational nuclear power plants will not be shut down by end of 2022, but will instead operate until 15 April to help cope with the electricity demand through the winter.

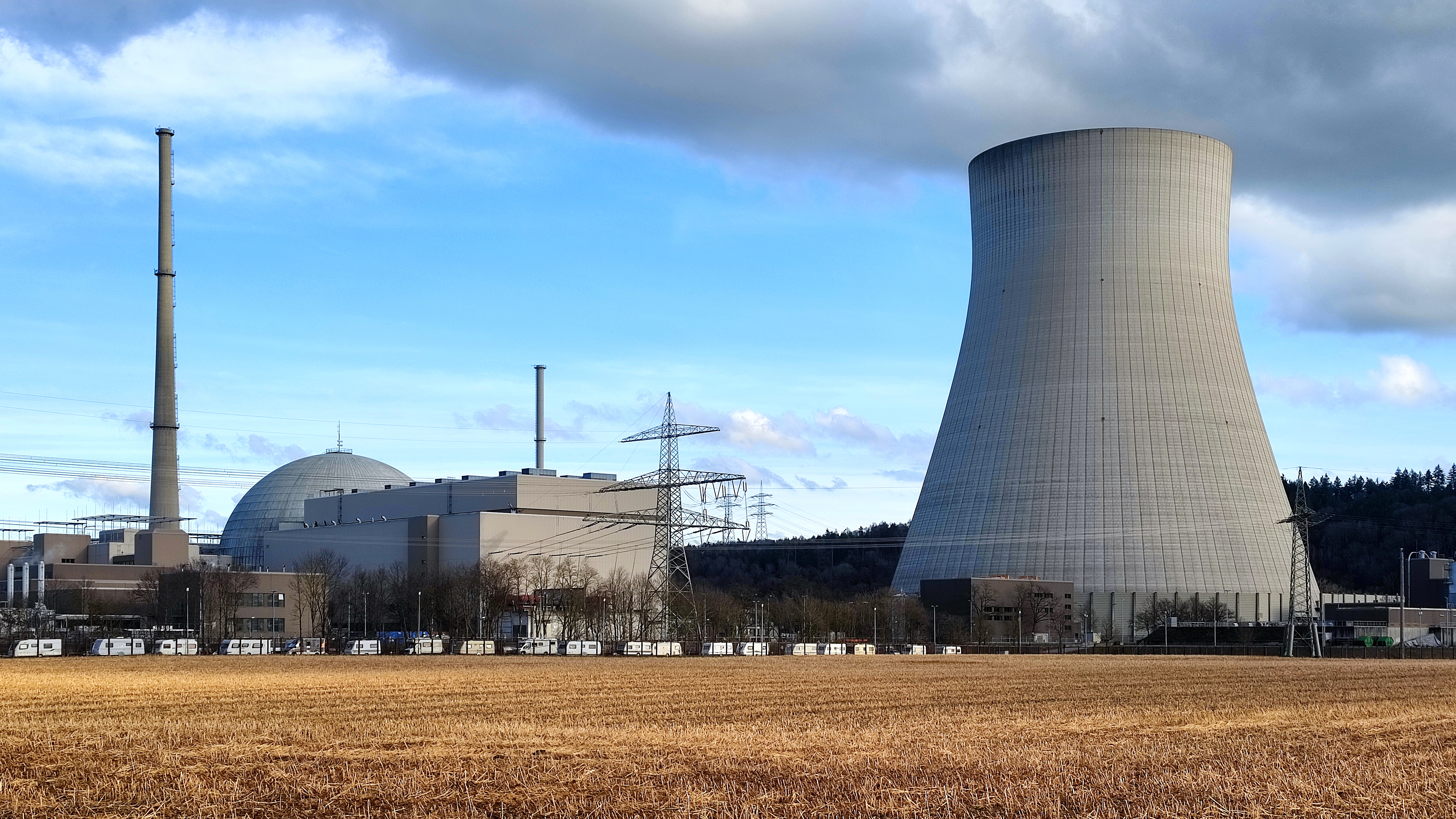
The Isar Nuclear Power Plant was taken out of service on 15 April 2023.

In 2023, the Government declared its plans to remove a key clause from the law that binds all ministries to reduce carbon emissions within their areas of responsibility. The binding target will be the overall 2030 emissions reduction target. The largest CO_{2} emissions source in Germany is its electricity production, and in that sector, emissions have roughly halved from its peak in 2007 until 2023. 2020 already saw a similar decline as 2023, as electricity demand dropped massively due to COVID-19 lockdowns, leading to an annual average CO_{2} intensity of German electricity production of 364 gCO_{2}/kWh (2023: 380 gCO_{2}/kWh). In 2022, the cut-off from Russian gas led to a brief restarting of coal power plants, meaning the share of coal in electricity production increased from 24% in 2020 to 32% in 2022, before going down to 27% in 2023.

In 2023 Energy Economics Institute (EWI) warned that around 50 new fossil gas powered plants need to be built to "compensate for the weather-dependent production of wind and solar power" with the overall cost reaching €60 billion. The budget is not secured by the Government nor available from the electricity sales. To move away from coal, in February 2024, the Federal Government agreed to subsidize 10 GW of hydrogen-ready gas plants. In the first years, the plants will use fossil gas and are expected to be switched over to hydrogen between 2035 and 2040. The plants will mainly provide backup capacity in times where solar and wind power are low. As running plants this way is not economically feasible, utilities will be paid for maintaining the baseload capacity.

The last three nuclear power plants in Germany—Emsland, Isar II and Neckarwestheim II—were shut down on 15 April 2023.

In March 2024, Federal Audit Office published a report in which it assessed the policy as not meeting goals on a number of points: the planned 80% share of renewable energy requires dispatchable sources but the assumed 10 GW in fossil gas generation is neither sufficient nor on schedule; extension of electric grid is behind the schedule by 6,000 km (3,700 mi) and 7 years; security of the supply chain is not sufficiently assessed; system costs to ensure 24/7 generation are underestimated and based on "best-case" scenarios; capacity installed in renewables is behind the schedule by 30%, whereas demand is expected to grow by 30% as result of electrification of heating and transport.

On 1 January 2025 Germany produced 120% of its electricity demand with renewables. During 2024 Germany added 3 GW of wind energy and 15 GW of solar. In 2024, 54% of Germany's electricity demand was produced by renewables.

On 7 April 2026 Germany minister of energy Katherina Reiche published an article in which she admitted that German society has "calmed itself down with ambitious goals" of the Energiewende while energy prices exploded, which led to deindustrialisation and highlighted that while electricity generation from renewables "does not issue bills [for fuel]" it results in massive grid balancing costs - "ETS costs, capacity reserve, grid reserve, redispatch costs, grid subsidies, subsidies for reducing energy prices", which total of 36 billion euros per year. She also criticized the phase-out of low-carbon and dispatchable nuclear generation.

== Criticism ==
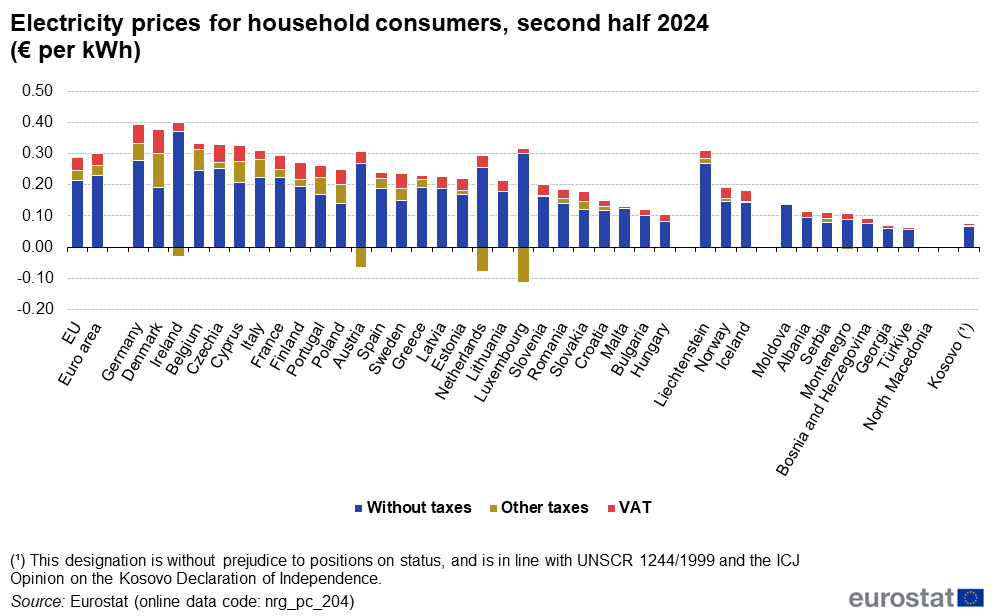
2024 Electricity prices for EU household consumers

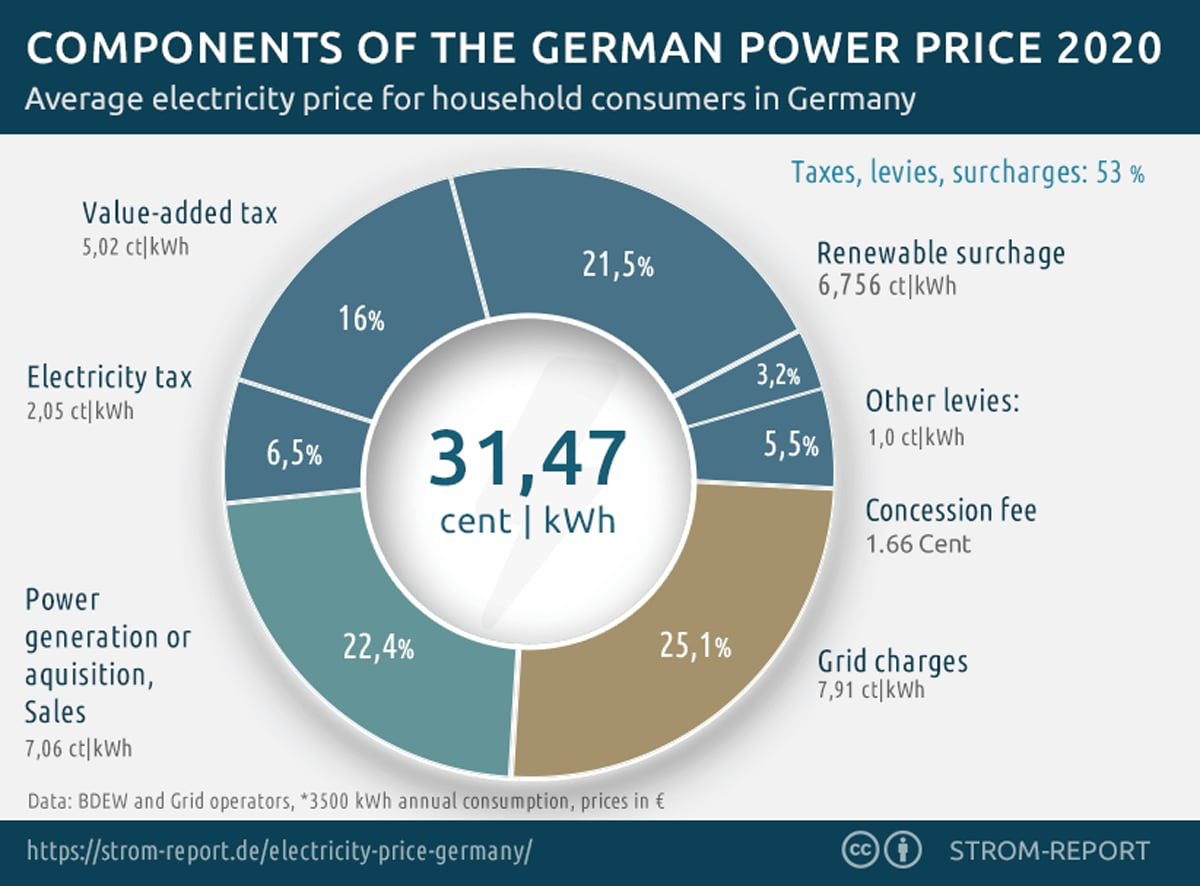
Components of the German electricity price for households in 2016

The Energiewende has been criticized for the high costs, the early nuclear phase-out which increased carbon emissions, continuation or increase in use of fossil fuels, risks to power supply stability and the environmental damage of biomass.

German association of local utilities VKU said "the strategy creates significant risks to the stability of power supply in case of 'lengthy periods' of weather unsuitable for wind and solar generation since energy storage in Germany is 'largely non-existent'".

After introduction of the original Renewable Energy Act in 2000, there was a focus on long term costs, while in later years this has shifted to a focus on short term costs and the "financial burden" of the Energiewende while ignoring environmental externalities of fossil fuels. Electricity prices for household customers in Germany have been generally increasing in the last decade. The renewable energy levy to finance green power investment is added to Germans' electricity unit price. The surcharge (22.1% in 2016) pays the state-guaranteed price for renewable energy to producers and is 6.35 cents per kWh in 2016.

A comprehensive study, published in Energy Policy in 2013, reported that Germany's nuclear power phase-out, to be complete by 2022, is contradictory to the goal of the climate portion of the program.

In June 2019, an open letter to "the leadership and people of Germany", written by almost 100 Polish environmentalists and scientist, urged Germany to "reconsider the decision on the final decommissioning of fully functional nuclear power plants" for the benefit of the fight against global warming.

German Economy and Energy Minister Sigmar Gabriel said in 2014 "For a country like Germany with a strong industrial base, exiting nuclear and coal-fired power generation at the same time would not be possible."

As nuclear and coal power plants are being phased out, the Government had begun to promote the use of fossil gas in order to bridge the gap between other fossil fuels and low-carbon energy sources. The move had been criticized by international observers, who argue that fossil fuel gas is "essentially methane, which constitutes at least one-third of global warming and is leaking into the atmosphere all across the gas production and delivery chain." It is also a more potent greenhouse gas than carbon-dioxide. It is also feared that the European Union, but particularly Germany, is making itself overly dependent on Russia for gas supplies via Nord Stream 2, thereby undermining its energy security. In light of the 2022 Russian invasion of Ukraine the Nord Stream 2 project was first postponed indefinitely and ultimately cancelled. The Scholz cabinet has spent considerable efforts since February 2022 to find replacements for Russian fossil gas both in the near and the long term, particularly LNG import terminals in Lubmin and Wilhelmshaven.

Germany's electricity transmission network is currently inadequately developed, therefore lacking the capability of delivering offshore wind energy produced on the Northern coast to industrial regions in southern Germany. The transmission system operators are planning to build an additional 4,000 kilometres (2,500 miles) of transmission lines until 2030.

Slow reduction of CO_{2} emissions in Germany, had been contrasted with France's successful decarbonization of its energy sector under the Messmer plan (from 1973) and the United Kingdom's carbon tax, which saw a drastic reduction of coal-powered energy from 88% in 1973 to below 1% in 2019.

German federal audit office report published in March 2021 highlighted the very high costs of Energiewende for the household users, where taxes and fees account for 50% of the bills, and the energy price is 43% higher than the EU average. It noted predicted shortage of 4.5 GW between 2022 and 2025 as result of the planned shutdown of nuclear power plants.

A study found that if Germany had postponed the nuclear phase out and phased out coal first, it could have saved 1,100 lives and €3 to €8 billion in social costs per year. The study concludes that policymakers would have to overestimate the risk or cost of a nuclear accident to conclude that the benefits of the phase-out exceed its social costs. An open letter by a number of climate scientists published in 2021 calls against the shut-down of the remaining nuclear reactors in Germany, that would lead to 5% increase in CO_{2} emissions from the electricity sector. According to a 2024 study, by keeping nuclear power Germany could have achieved 73% drop in CO_{2} emissions instead of 25% in the study period (2002–2022).

The Renewable Energy Act had a significant impact on businesses and industries and had been met with criticism, resulting in increased costs and slowed-down growth.

During the 2024 presidential debate between the Republican nominee, Donald Trump, and the Democratic nominee, Kamala Harris, Trump criticized Germany's energy transition efforts.

=== Biomass ===
Biomass made up 7.0% of Germany's power generation mix in 2017. Biomass has the potential to be a carbon-neutral fuel because growing biomass absorbs carbon dioxide from the atmosphere and a portion of the carbon absorbed remains in the ground after harvest. However, using Biomass as a fuel produces air pollution in the form of carbon monoxide, carbon dioxide, NO_{x} (nitrogen oxides), VOCs (volatile organic compounds), particulates and other pollutants, although biomass produces less sulfur dioxide than coal.

Between 2004 and 2011 policies lead to around 7,000 km^{2} (2,700 mi^{2}) new maize-fields for biomass-energy by ploughing-up of at least 2,700 km^{2} (1,000 mi^{2}) of grassland. This released large amounts of climate active gases, loss of biodiversity, and potential of groundwater recharge.

There are attempts to use biogas as partially renewable fuel with Green Planet Energy selling gas containing 10% of biogas, 1% hydrogen and 90% imported fossil gas.

== Citizen support and participation ==
As of 2016, citizen support for the Energiewende remained high, with surveys indicating that about 80–90% of the public are in favor. One reason for the high acceptance was the substantial participation of German citizens in the Energiewende, as private households, land owners, or members of energy cooperatives (Genossenschaft). A 2016 survey showed that roughly one in two Germans would consider investing in community renewable energy projects. Manfred Fischedick, Director of the Wuppertal Institute for Climate, Environment and Energy has commented that "if people participate with their own money, for example in a wind or solar power plant in their area, they will also support [the Energiewende]." A 2010 study shows the benefits to municipalities of community ownership of renewable generation in their locality.

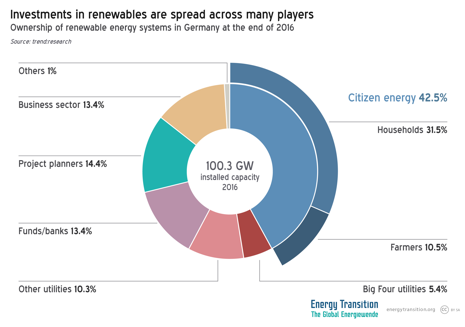
The share of renewable energy owned by citizens has decreased since the beginning of the Energiewende.

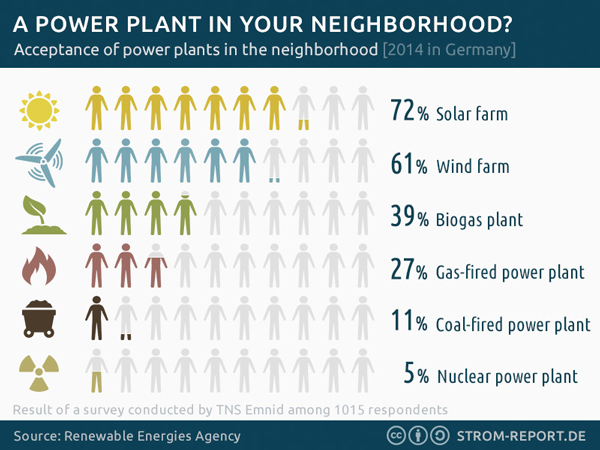
Acceptance of power plants in the neighborhood (Germany 2014)

Estimates for 2012 suggested that almost half the renewable energy capacity in Germany was owned by citizens through energy cooperatives and private initiatives. Citizens accounted for nearly half of all installed biogas and solar capacity and half of the installed onshore wind capacity.

According to a 2014 survey conducted by TNS Emnid for the German Renewable Energies Agency among 1015 respondents, 94 percent of the Germans supported the enforced expansion of Renewable Energies. More than two-thirds of the interviewees agreed to renewable power plants close to their homes. The share of total energy from renewables was 11% in 2014.

Changes in energy policy, with the Renewable Energy Sources Act in 2014, have jeopardized the efforts of citizens to participate. The share of citizen-owned renewable energy has since dropped to 42.5% as of 2016.

The Renewable Energy Sources Act provides compensation to wind turbine operators for every kilowatt-hour of electricity not produced if wind power surpasses peak grid capacity, while grid operators must splice electricity from renewable sources into the grid in times of low or no demand for it. This can lead to a negative price of electricity, and grid operators may pass associated costs on to customers, estimated to be costing them an extra €4 billion in 2020. This has resulted in greater resistance to certain Energiewende policies, specifically wind power.

By 2019, Germany also saws a significant increase of organized opposition against on-shore wind farms, especially in Bavaria and Baden-Württemberg.

== Computer studies ==
Much of the policy development for the Energiewende is underpinned by computer models, run mostly by universities and research institutes. The models are usually based on scenario analysis and are used to investigate different assumptions regarding the stability, sustainability, cost, efficiency, and public acceptability of various sets of technologies. Some models cover the entire energy sector, while others are confined to electricity generation and consumption. A 2016 book investigates the usefulness and limitations of energy scenarios and energy models within the context of the Energiewende.

A number of computer studies confirm the feasibility of the German electricity system being 100% renewable in 2050. Some investigate the prospect of the entire energy system (all energy carriers) being fully renewable.

=== 2009 WWF study ===
In 2009 World Wide Fund for Nature (WWF) Germany published a study prepared by the Öko-Institut, Prognos, and Hans-Joachim Ziesing. The study presumes a 95% reduction in greenhouse gases by the year 2050 and covers all sectors. The study shows that the transformation from a high-carbon to a low-carbon economy is possible and affordable. It notes that by committing to this transformation path, Germany could become a model for other countries.

=== 2011 German Advisory Council on the Environment study ===
A 2011 report from the German Advisory Council on the Environment (SRU) concludes that Germany can attain 100% renewable electricity generation by 2050. The German Aerospace Center (DLR) REMix high-resolution energy model was used for the analysis. A range of scenarios were investigated and a cost-competitive transition with good security of supply is possible.

The authors presume that the transmission network will continue to be reinforced and that cooperation with Norway and Sweden would allow their hydro generation to be used for storage. The transition does not require Germany's nuclear phase-out (Atomausstieg) to be extended nor the construction of coal-fired plants with carbon capture and storage (CCS). Conventional generation assets need not be stranded and an orderly transition should prevail. Stringent energy efficiency and energy saving programs can bring down the future costs of electricity.

=== 2015 Deep Decarbonization Pathways Project study ===
The Deep Decarbonization Pathways Project (DDPP) aims to demonstrate how countries can transform their energy systems by 2050 in order to achieve a low-carbon economy. The 2015 German country report, produced in association with the Wuppertal Institute, examines the official target of reducing domestic GHG emissions by 80% to 95% by 2050 (compared with 1990). Decarbonization pathways for Germany are illustrated by means of three scenarios with energy-related emission reductions between 1990 and 2050 varying between 80% and more than 90%. The three strategies strongly contribute to GHG emission reduction:

- energy efficiency improvements (in all sectors, especially in buildings)
- increased use of domestic renewables (with a focus on electricity generation)
- electrification and (in two of the scenarios) use of renewable electricity-based synthetic fuels (especially in the transport and industry sector)

In addition, some scenarios use controversially:

- final energy demand reductions through behavioral changes (modal shift in transport, changes in eating and heating habits)
- net imports of electricity from renewable sources or of bioenergy
- use of carbon capture and storage (CCS) technology to reduce industry sector GHG emissions (including cement production)

Potential co-benefits for Germany include increased energy security, higher competitiveness of and global business opportunities for companies, job creation, stronger GDP growth, smaller energy bills for households, and less air pollution.

=== 2015 Fraunhofer ISE study ===
Using the model REMod-D (Renewable Energy Model – Germany), this 2015 Fraunhofer ISE study investigates several system transformation scenarios and their related costs. The guiding question of the study is: "how can a cost-optimised transformation of the German energy system—with consideration of all energy carriers and consumer sectors—be achieved while meeting the declared climate protection targets and ensuring a secure energy supply at all times." Carbon capture and storage (CCS) is excluded from the scenarios. An energy scenario emitting 85% less CO_{2} emissions than 1990 levels is compared with a reference scenario, assumes that the German energy system operates in 2050 the same way as it does today. Primary energy supply drops 42%. The total costs depend on the future prices for carbon and oil. If the penalty for CO_{2} emissions increases to €100/tonne by 2030 and thereafter remains constant and fossil fuel prices increase annually by 2%, then the total cumulative costs of today's energy system are 8% higher than the costs required for the minus 85% scenario up to 2050. The report notes:

From the macroeconomic perspective, the transformation of Germany's energy system demands a significant shift in cash flow, moving the cash spent on energy imports today to spend it instead on new investments in systems, their operation and maintenance. In this respect a transformed energy system requires a large expenditure for local added value, a factor which also does not appear in the shown cost analysis.

=== 2015 DIW study ===
A 2015 study uses DIETER or Dispatch and Investment Evaluation Tool with Endogenous Renewables, developed by the German Institute for Economic Research (DIW), Berlin, Germany. The study examines the power storage requirements for renewables uptake ranging from 60% to 100%. Under the scenario of 80% (the German government target for 2050), grid storage requirements remain moderate and other options on both the supply side and demand side offer flexibility at low cost. Storage plays a role in the provision of reserves. Storage becomes more pronounced under higher shares of renewables, but strongly depends on the costs and availability of other flexibility options, particularly on biomass availability. The model is fully described in the study report.

=== 2016 acatech study ===
A 2016 acatech-lead study focused on "flexibility technologies" used to balance the fluctuations inherent in power generation from wind and photovoltaics. Set in 2050, several scenarios use gas power plants to stabilise the energy system, ensuring supply security during several weeks of low wind and solar radiation. Other scenarios investigate a 100% renewable system and show these to be possible but costly. Flexible consumption and storage control (demand-side management) in households and the industrial sector is the cost-efficient means of balancing short-term power fluctuations. Long-term storage systems, based on power-to-X, are only viable if carbon emissions are to be reduced by more than 80%. The study notes:

Assuming that the price of emissions allowances in 2050 will significantly surpass its current level, a power generation system boasting a high percentage of wind and photovoltaics will, as a rule, come cheaper than a system dominated by fossil fuel power plants.

=== 2016 Stanford University study ===
The Atmosphere/Energy Program at Stanford University has developed roadmaps for 139 countries to achieve energy systems powered only by wind, water, and sunlight (WWS) by 2050. Total end-use energy drops from 375.8 GW for business-as-usual to 260.9 GW under a fully renewable transition. Load shares in 2050 would be: on-shore wind 35%, off-shore wind 17%, wave 0.08%, geothermal 0.01%, hydro-electric 0.87%, tidal 0%, residential PV 6.75%, commercial PV 6.48%, utility PV 33.8%, and concentrating solar power 0%. The study also assess avoided air pollution, eliminated global climate change costs, and net job creation.

== See also ==
- Dunkelflaute
- Electricity sector in Germany
- Energieeinsparverordnung – German building energy regulations
- Energy in Germany
- Energy modeling
- European Green Deal
- Federal Network Agency
- Fossil fuel phase-out
- The Fourth Revolution: Energy
- German Renewable Energy Act
- German Solar Industry Association
- Germany National Renewable Energy Action Plan
- KfW IPEX-Bank
- List of countries by renewable electricity production
- Low-carbon economy
- Passivhaus
- Renewable energy commercialization
- Renewable energy in Germany
- Renewable energy in the European Union
- Soft energy path
- Wildpoldsried
- Greenpeace Energy
