= Applied ecology =

Applied Ecology
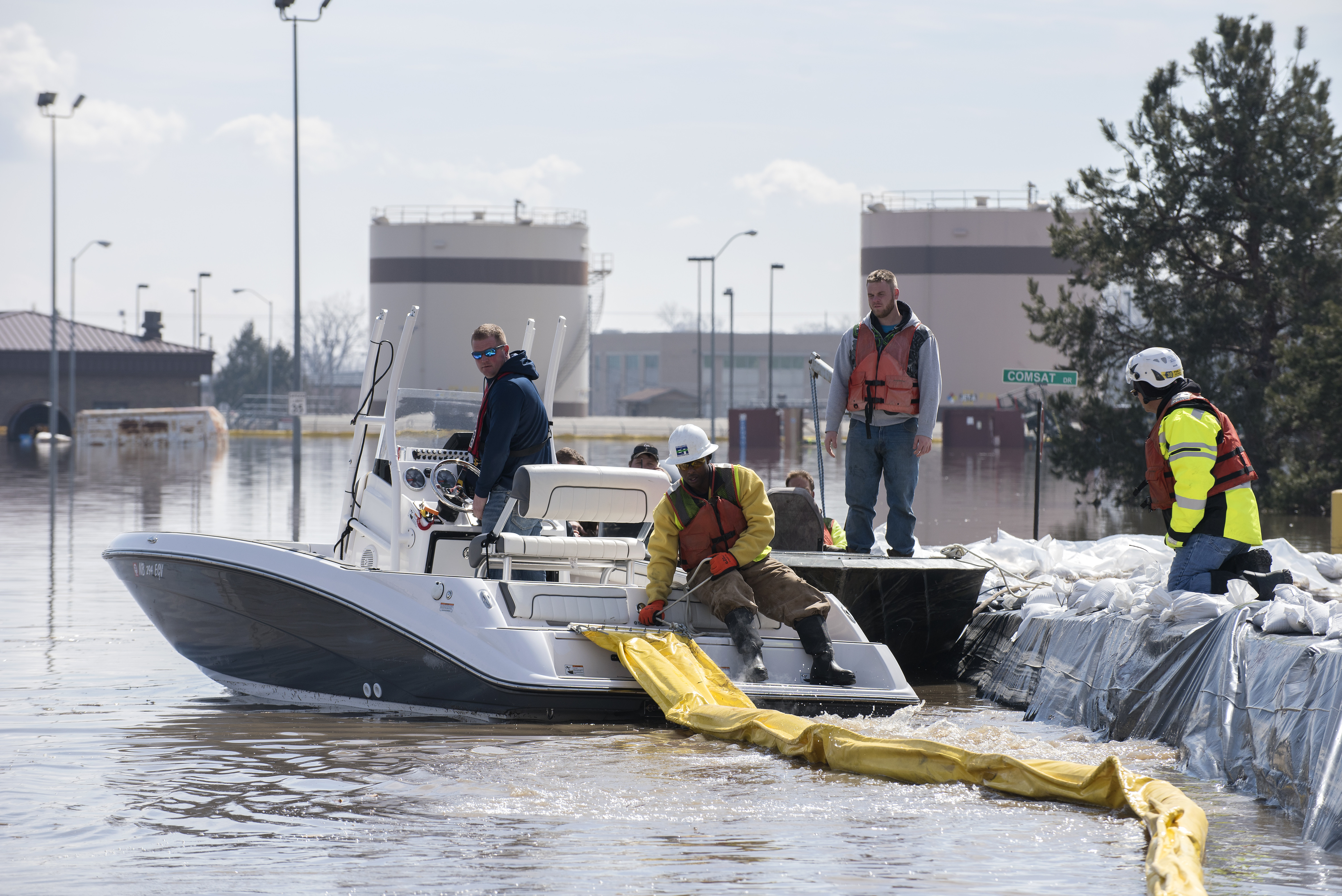

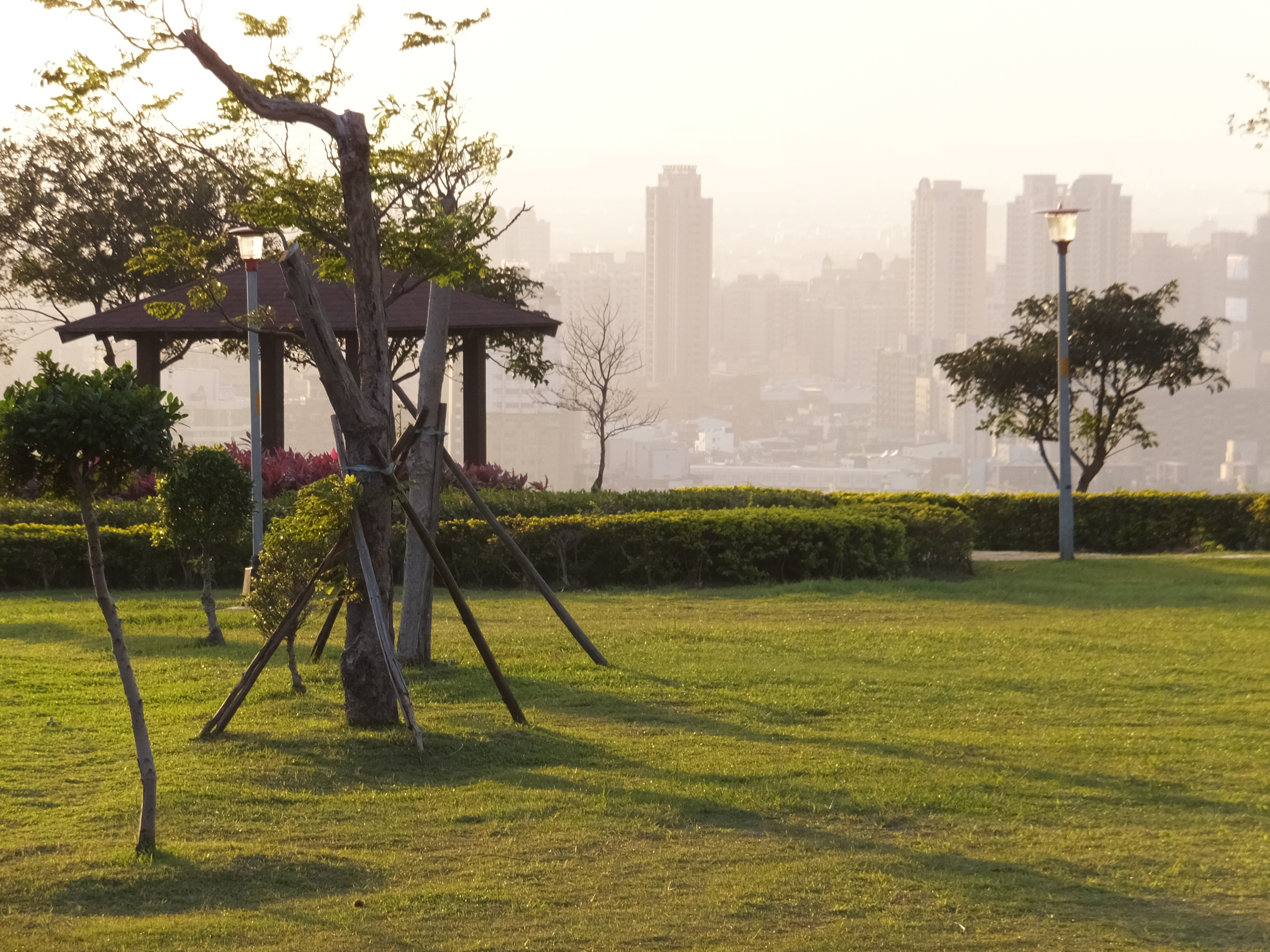
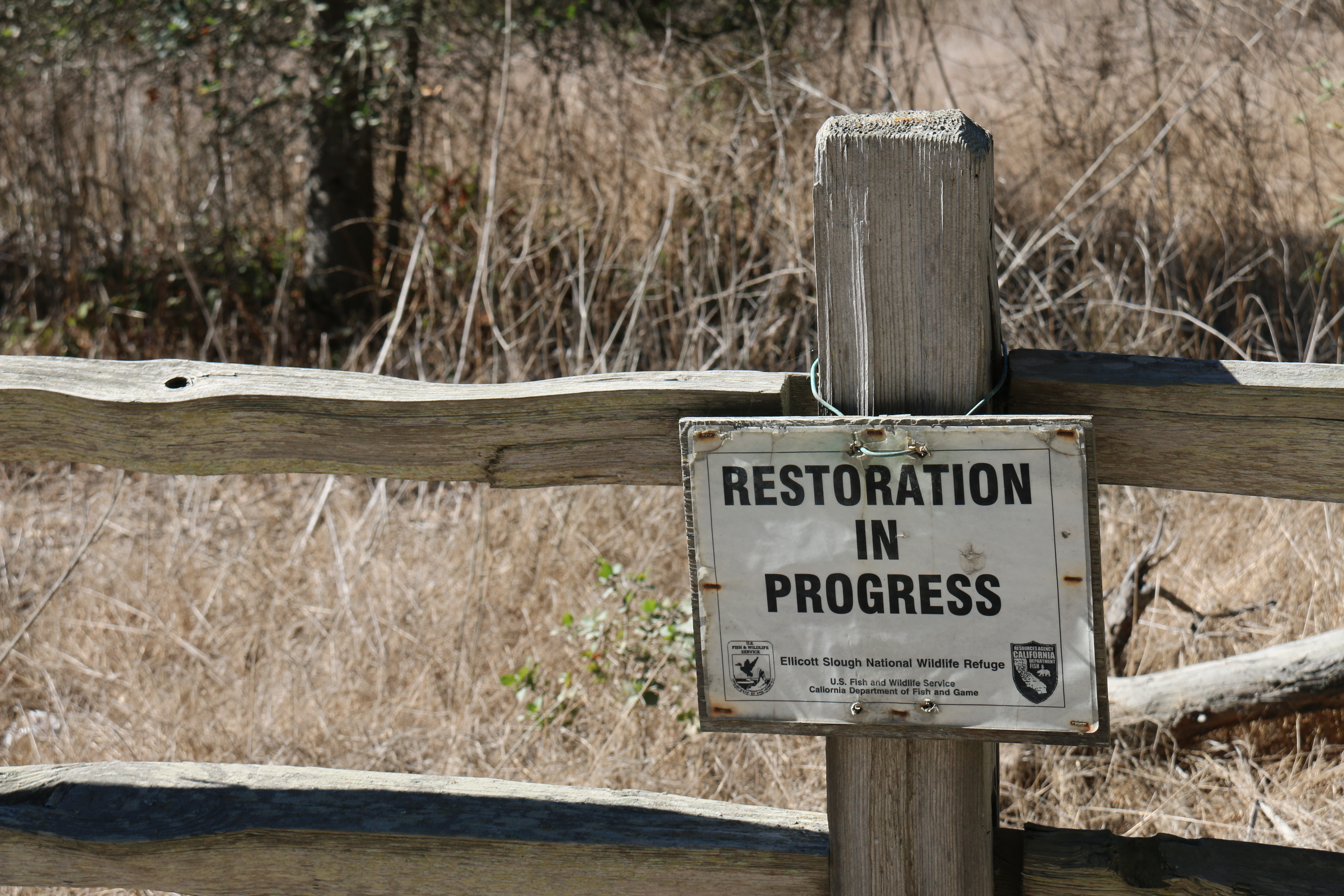

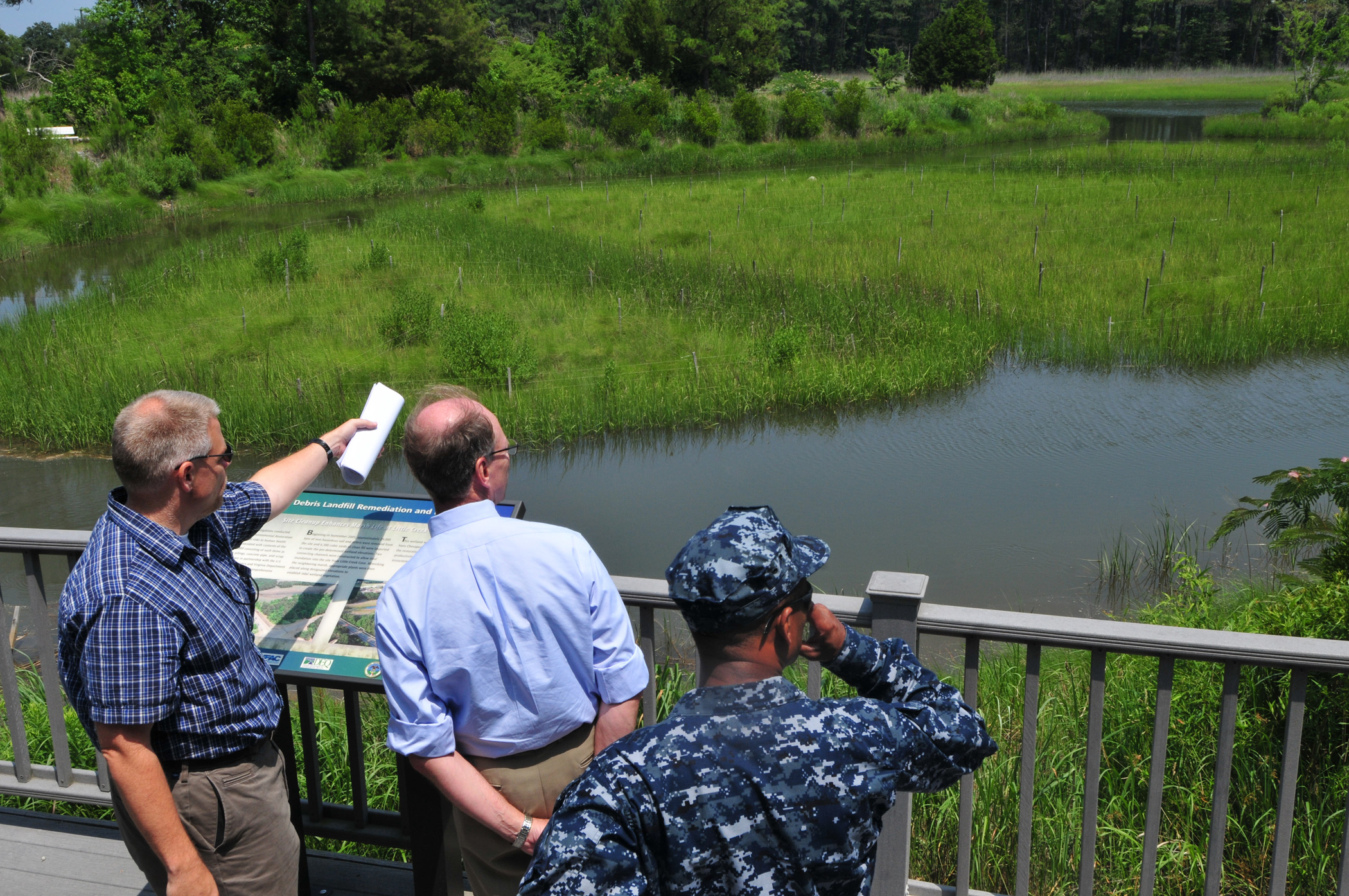
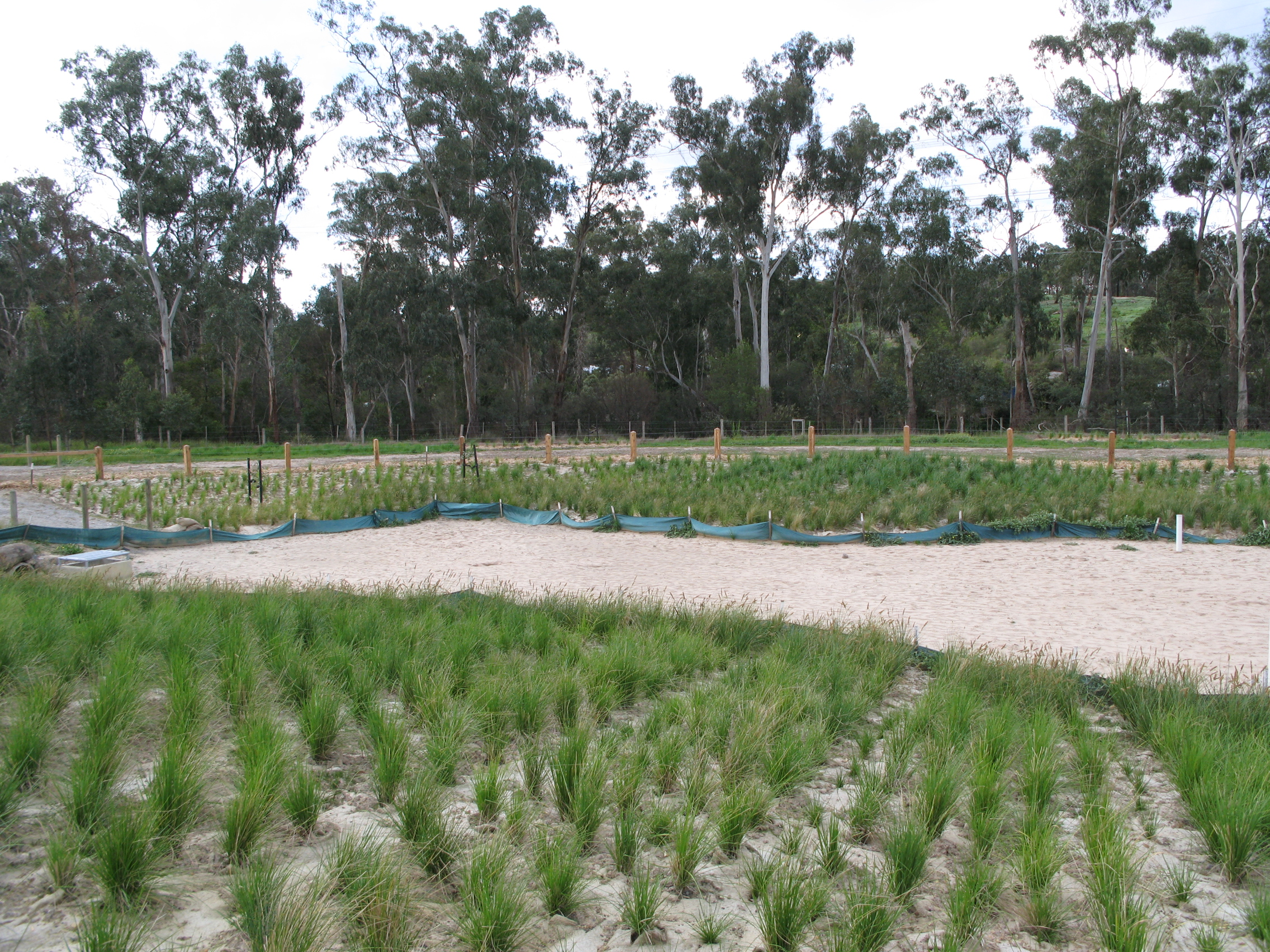
- Applied uses ecological approaches to address problems of specific parts of the environment.

Applied ecology is a sub-field within ecology that considers the application of the science of ecology to real-world (usually management) questions. It is also described as a scientific field that focuses on the application of concepts, theories, models, or methods of fundamental ecology to environmental problems.

== Concept ==
Applied ecology is an integrated treatment of the ecological, social, and biotechnological aspects of natural resource conservation and management. Applied ecology typically focuses on geomorphology, soils, and plant communities as the underpinnings for vegetation and wildlife (both game and non-game) management.

Applied ecology includes all disciplines that are related to human activities so that it does not only cover agriculture, forestry and fisheries but also global change. It has two study categories. The first involves the outputs or those fields that address the use and management of the environment, particularly for its ecosystem services and exploitable resources. The second are the inputs or those that are concerned with the management strategies or human influences on the ecosystem or biodiversity.

The discipline is often linked to ecological management on the grounds that the effective management of natural ecosystems depends on ecological knowledge. It often uses an ecological approach to solve problems of specific parts of the environment, which can involve the comparison of plausible options (e.g. best management options).

The role of applied science in agricultural production has been brought into greater focus as fluctuations in global food production feed through into prices and availability to consumers.

== Approaches ==
Applied ecologists often use one or more of the following approaches, namely, observation, experimentation, and modeling. For example, a wildlife preservation project could involve: observational studies of the wildlife ecology; experiments to understand causal relationships; and the application of modeling to determine the information beyond the scope of experimentation.

The ecological approach used in applied ecology could include inputs from management strategies such as conservation biology, restoration ecology, global change, ecotoxicology, biomonitoring, biodiversity, environmental policies, and economics, among others. Restoration ecology is a particularly prominent strategy in the discipline since it applies the principles of restoring and repairing damaged ecological systems to their original state.

Like those used in ecological theory, many areas of the discipline employ approaches that are based on simple statistical and analytical models (e.g. spatial models) as well as those with mathematical properties (e.g. matrix models). There is also the digital computer simulation modeling, which is designed to solve statistical ecology problems and to achieve bioeconomic goals such as the forecasting and the evaluation of consequences for specific activities.

Applied ecology also requires human interest, particularly the exercise of judgments of relative values and goals.

== Applications ==
Applied ecology can be applied to the economic development process. The discipline, for example, can be integrated into the national economic planning to comprehensively address environmental concerns since these problems are intersectoral and interdisciplinary in nature.

Aspects of applied ecology include:

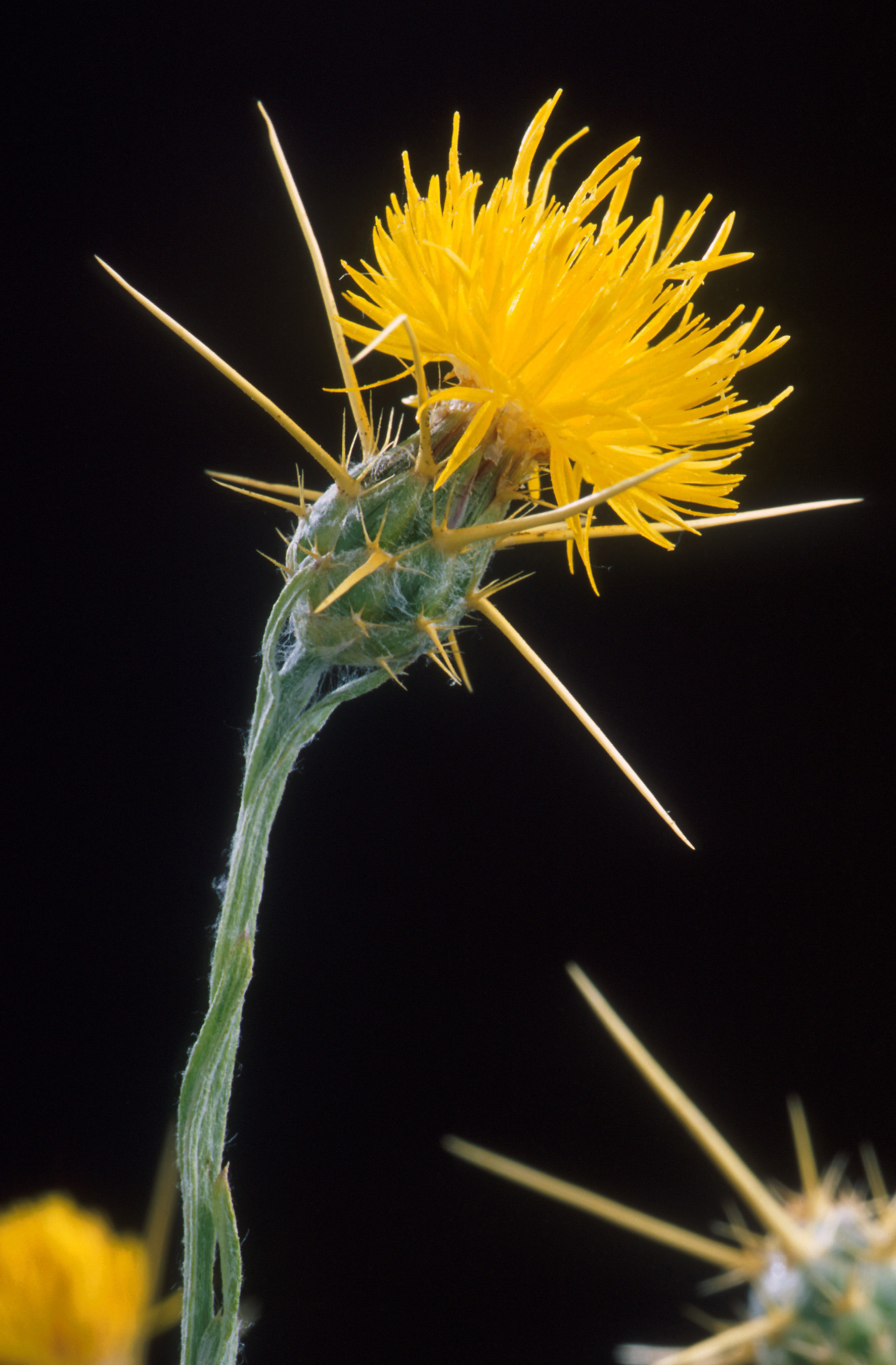
Yellow star thistle is an invasive species in Yosemite National Park.

- Agro-ecosystem management
- Biodiversity conservation
- Biotechnology
- Conservation biology
- Disturbance management
- Ecosystem restoration
- Environmental engineering
- Environmental technology
- Habitat management
- Invasive species management
- Landscape use (including development planning)
- Protected areas management
- Rangeland management
- Restoration ecology
- Wildlife management (including game)

Major journals in the field include:

- Journal of Applied Ecology
- Ecological Applications
- Applied Ecology and Environmental Research

Related organizations include:

- Ecological Society of America (The Americas)
- Society for Ecological Restoration (Global)
- Institute for Applied Ecology (USA)
- Kazakh Agency of Applied Ecology
- Öko-Institut (Institute for Applied Ecology) (in Germany)

== See also ==
- Holistic management
- Natural environment
- Natural resource
- Nature
- Environmental impact design
- Landscape planning

== Bibliography ==
- Skelly, David K.; Freidenburg, L. Kealoha (23 May 2012). "Applied Ecology". Ecology. doi:10.1093/OBO/9780199830060-0039. ISBN 978-0-19-983006-0.
- Lubchenco, J. (23 January 1998). "Entering the Century of the Environment: A New Social Contract for Science". Science. 279 (5350): 491–497. Bibcode:1998Sci...279..491L. doi:10.1126/science.279.5350.491.
- Caldwell, Lynton K. (August 1966). "Problems of Applied Ecology: Perceptions, Institutions, Methods, and Operational Tools". BioScience. 16 (8): 524–527. doi:10.2307/1293702. JSTOR 1293702.
- Hobbs, Richard J.; Hallett, Lauren M.; Ehrlich, Paul R.; Mooney, Harold A. (June 2011). "Intervention Ecology: Applying Ecological Science in the Twenty-first Century". BioScience. 61 (6): 442–450. doi:10.1525/bio.2011.61.6.6. S2CID 12367177.
- Encyclopedia of Applied Plant Sciences. Academic Press. 2017. ISBN 978-0-12-394808-3.
- Frouz, J; Frouzová, J (2022). Applied Ecology. Springer International Publishing. doi:10.1007/978-3-030-83225-4. ISBN 978-3-030-83224-7. S2CID 245009867.
