= Environmental design =

Design process

Environmental design is the process of addressing surrounding environmental parameters when devising plans, programs, policies, buildings, or products. It seeks to create spaces that will enhance the natural, social, cultural and physical environment of particular areas. Classical prudent design may have always considered environmental factors; however, the environmental movement beginning in the 1940s has made the concept more explicit.

Environmental design can also refer to the applied arts and sciences dealing with creating the human-designed environment. These fields include architecture, geography, urban planning, landscape architecture, and interior design. Environmental design can also encompass interdisciplinary areas such as historical preservation and lighting design. In terms of a larger scope, environmental design has implications for the industrial design of products: innovative automobiles, wind power generators, solar-powered equipment, and other kinds of equipment could serve as examples. Currently, the term has expanded to apply to ecological and sustainability issues.

== Core principles ==
1. Sustainability - Minimizing the environmental impact of human activities through the use of renewable resources, energy-efficient technologies, and eco-friendly materials.
2. Functionality - Designing spaces that are practical, accessible, and tailored to the needs and behaviors of the people who will use them.
3. Aesthetics - Incorporating elements of visual appeal, sensory experience, and emotional connection into the design.
4. Holistic Approach - Considering the interconnected social, economic, and ecological factors that shape the environment.

== Modern uses ==
Today, environmental design is applied across a wide range of scales, from small-scale residential projects to large-scale urban planning initiatives. Key areas of focus include:

- Sustainable architecture and green building
- Landscape architecture and urban planning
- Transportation design and infrastructure
- Industrial design and product development
- Interior design and space planning

Environmental designers often collaborate with experts from disciplines such as engineering, ecology, sociology, and public policy to create holistic solutions that address the complex challenges of modern environments.

== History ==
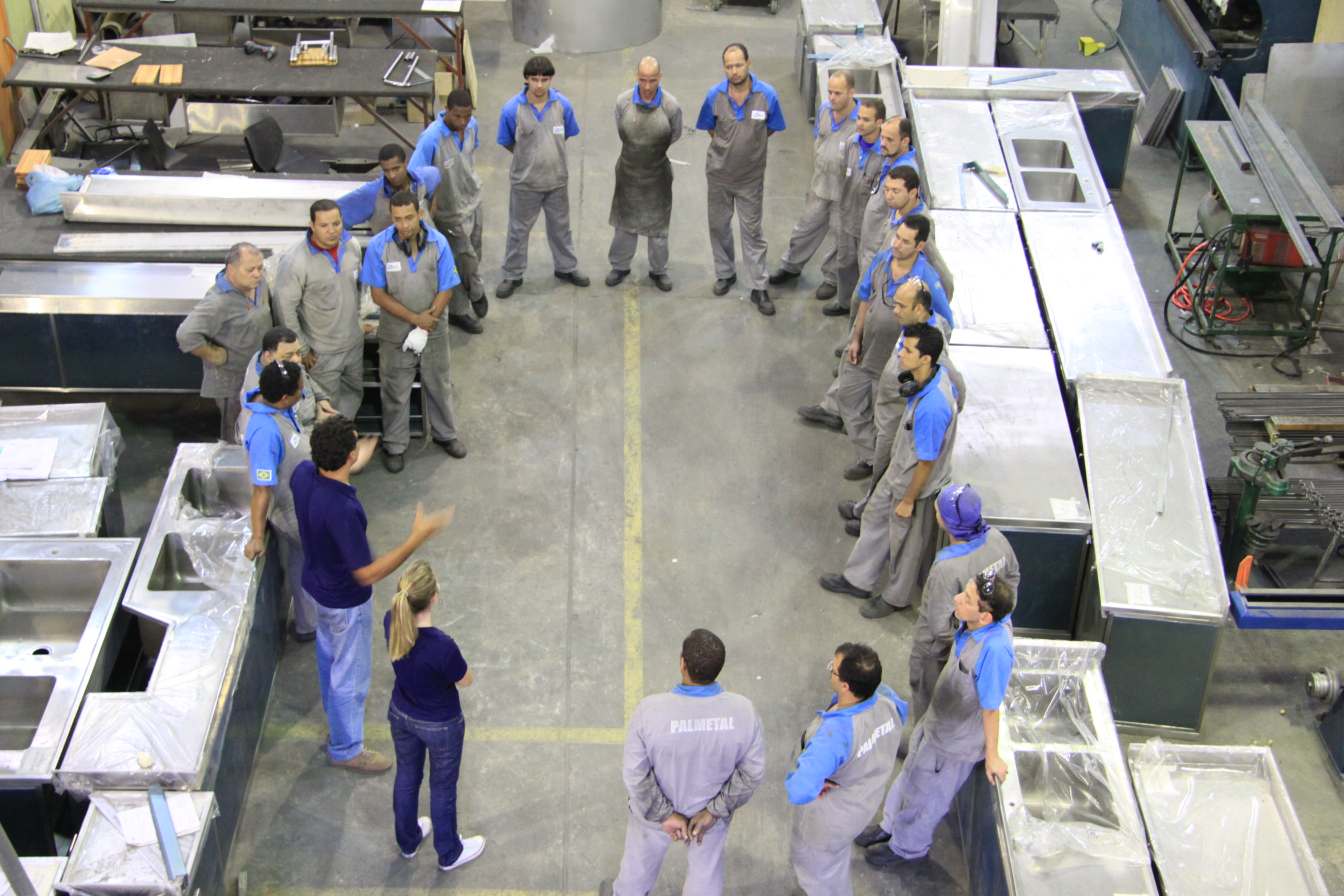
The photo shows a training meeting with factory workers in a stainless steel ecodesign company from Rio de Janeiro, Brazil.

The first traceable concepts of environmental design focused primarily on solar heating, which began in Ancient Greece around 500 BCE. At the time, most of Greece had exhausted its supply of wood for fuel, leading architects to design houses that would capture the solar energy of the sun. The Greeks understood that the position of the sun varies throughout the year. For a latitude of 40 degrees in summer the sun is high in the south, at an angle of 70 degrees at the zenith, while in winter, the sun travels a lower trajectory, with a zenith of 26 degrees. Greek houses were built with south-facing façades which received little to no sun in the summer but would receive full sun in the winter, warming the house. Additionally, the southern orientation also protected the house from the colder northern winds. This clever arrangement of buildings influenced the use of the grid pattern of ancient cities. With the north–south orientation of the houses, the streets of Greek cities mainly ran east–west.

The practice of solar architecture continued with the Romans, who similarly had deforested much of their native Italian Peninsula by the first century BCE. The Roman heliocaminus, literally 'solar furnace', functioned with the same aspects of the earlier Greek houses. The numerous public baths were oriented to the south. Roman architects added glass to windows to allow for the passage of light and to conserve interior heat as it could not escape. The Romans also used greenhouses to grow crops all year long and to cultivate the exotic plants coming from the far corners of the Empire. Pliny the Elder wrote of greenhouses that supplied the kitchen of the Emperor Tiberius during the year.

Along with the solar orientation of buildings and the use of glass as a solar heat collector, the ancients knew other ways of harnessing solar energy. The Greeks, Romans and Chinese developed curved mirrors that could concentrate the sun's rays on an object with enough intensity to make it burn in seconds. The solar reflectors were often made of polished silver, copper or brass.

Early roots of modern environmental design began in the late 19th century with writer/designer William Morris, who rejected the use of industrialized materials and processes in wallpaper, fabrics and books his studio produced. He and others, such as John Ruskin felt that the industrial revolution would lead to harm done to nature and workers.

The narrative of Brian Danitz and Chris Zelov's documentary film Ecological Design: Inventing the Future asserts that in the decades after World War II, "The world was forced to confront the dark shadow of science and industry." From the middle of the twentieth century, thinkers like Buckminster Fuller have acted as catalysts for a broadening and deepening of the concerns of environmental designers. Nowadays, energy efficiency, appropriate technology, organic horticulture and agriculture, land restoration, New Urbanism, and ecologically sustainable energy and waste systems are recognized considerations or options and may each find application.

By integrating renewable energy sources such as solar photovoltaic, solar thermal, and even geothermal energy into structures, it is possible to create zero emission buildings, where energy consumption is self-generating and non-polluting. It is also possible to construct "energy-plus buildings" which generate more energy than they consume, and the excess could then be sold to the grid. In the United States, the LEED Green Building Rating System rates structures on their environmental sustainability.

== Environmental design and planning ==
Environmental design and planning is the moniker used by several Ph.D. programs that take a multidisciplinary approach to the built environment. Typically environmental design and planning programs address architectural history or design (interior or exterior), city or regional planning, landscape architecture history or design, environmental planning, construction science, cultural geography, or historic preservation. Social science methods are frequently employed; aspects of sociology or psychology can be part of a research program.

The concept of "environmental" in these programs is quite broad and can encompass aspects of the natural, built, work, or social environments.

=== Areas of research ===
- Architecture
- Construction science
- Ecology
- Environmental impact design
- Environmental planning
- Environmental psychology
- Environmental sociology
- Historic preservation
- Landscape architecture
- Sociology of architecture
- Sustainability
- Urban planning

=== Academic programs ===
The following universities offer a Ph.D. in environmental design and planning:

- Clemson University, College of Architecture, Arts and Humanities (Now called "Planning, Design, and the Built Environment")
- Arizona State University, College of Design
- Kansas State University
- University of Calgary (technically the Ph.D. is in "environmental design," but encompasses the same scope as the other programs)

Virginia Tech until recently offered the degree program, but has since replaced it with programs in "architecture and design research" and "planning, governance, and globalization".

Fanshawe College in London, Ontario Canada offers an honours bachelor's degree called "Environmental Design and planning.

=== Related programs ===
- University of Missouri, Columbia: Ph.D. in Human Environmental Sciences (PDF file) with emphasis in Architectural Studies.
- Texas A & M University offers a Ph.D. in architecture that emphasizes environmental design.

== Examples ==
Examples of the environmental design process include use of roadway noise computer models in design of noise barriers and use of roadway air dispersion models in analyzing and designing urban highways.

Designers consciously working within this more recent framework of philosophy and practice seek a blending of nature and technology, regarding ecology as the basis for design. Some believe that strategies of conservation, stewardship, and regeneration can be applied at all levels of scale from the individual building to the community, with benefit to the human individual and local and planetary ecosystems.

Specific examples of large scale environmental design projects include:

- Boston Transportation Planning Review
- BART – Bay Area Rapid Transit System Daly City Turn-back project and airport extension.
- Metropolitan Portland, Oregon light rail system

== See also ==
- Green building
- Green development
- Land recycling
- Passive solar building design
- Sustainable development
- Ecological design
- Bachelor of Environmental Design
- Environmental sustainable innovation

Guide, A. "Environmental design." Chartered Institute of Building Services Engineers (CIBSE) 4 (2006): 5.
