= Günter Altner =

German scientist, biologist and writer

- Born: 20 September 1936; Breslau
- Died: 6 December 2011 (aged 75); Berlin
- Education: University of Wuppertal, University of Göttingen, University of Mainz, University of Giessen

Günter Altner (20 September 1936 – 6 December 2011) was a German interdisciplinary active scientist, biologist, Protestant theologian, ecologist, environmentalist, writer and lecturer. Altner had briefly been a professor of human biology at the University of Education Schwäbisch Gmünd, subsequently focussed on theology, his second area of education, and was a professor of protestant theology at the University of Koblenz and Landau for 22 years.

Altner is known for his teaching and lectures, his numerous books, his role of co-founder and curator of the Öko-Institut and his activity as political advisor to the German government. With his expertise in ecology and in the theological reflection on environmental ethics he held a unique position in the German-language theological and political discourse.

== Education ==
From 1956 to 1962, Altner studied protestant theology at the University of Wuppertal and the University of Göttingen, moving on in 1962 to study biology at the University of Mainz and the University of Giessen until 1968.

In 1964 he earned his doctorate degree in biology, and in 1968 a doctorate degree in theology.

== Work ==
As of 1961, Altner began work for the Evangelical Church in the Rhineland. From 1968 bis 1971 he was a director of studies at the Protestant Academy in Mülheim an der Ruhr in research on the relationship between religion and science. 1971 he became professor ordinarius for human biology at the University of Education Schwäbisch Gmünd, and 1973 he joined the Forschungsstätte der Evangelischen Studiengemeinschaft (FEST e.V.) in Heidelberg.

From 1977 until 1999, Altner was professor of protestant theology at the Universität Koblenz-Landau with focus on systematic theology and social ethics. His research covered the areas of environmental policy and energy policy, genetic engineering, sustainability and health policy. He also was member of the scientific advisory council of the Institut Mensch, Ethik und Wissenschaft (IMEW) and reflected on the positions taken by the Evangelical Church in Germany regarding questions of nuclear energy, responsibility towards creation and peace policy.

Altner spoke in favor of a nuclear power phase-out and against the planning of a nuclear power plant in Wyhl. 1977 Altner was among the co-founders of the Öko-Institut in Freiburg im Breisgau. From 1977 to 1979 he was member of the Vorstand of the Vereinigung Deutscher Wissenschaftler, and from 1979 to 1982 member of the Enquete Commission Zukünftige Energiepolitik of the German Bundestag.

== Emeritus ==
As professor emeritus he moved to Berlin, where he took up contact with the Hans Jonas-Institute among others, providing for example the intellectual inspiration for a symposium to take place with Karl-Otto Apel in 2010. Altner was called to be member of the Ethik-Beirat with the German Federal Ministry of Health from 1999 to 2002.

In 2003, together with his wife Ingetraud Combecher, he founded the Altner–Combecher–Foundation for Ecology and Peace which aims to encourage research in ecology, alternative technology and peace studies. The foundation has supported, among others, the TORCH report that was published in 2006.

== Publications and influence ==
Altner authored and edited altogether over 40 books on biological, theological and ecological matters and held approximately 4000 lectures.

Altner played a relevant role in the discourse in Germany thanks to his interdisciplinary academic background and his expertise both in ecology and in the theological reflection on environmental ethics. He is recognized as a pioneer of the dialogue between natural sciences and theology in Germany, taking particular interest in the consequences to the environment that result from the scientific/technological civilisation. His influence reaches beyond German-speaking countries. In particular, biologist Brian Goodwin dedicated part of the last chapter of his book How the Leopard Changed its Spots to Altner's views on the human responsibility for creation and on rights to be attributed to nature.

== Awards and honors ==
- 2000 honorary doctorate degree of the Lüneburg University
- Festschrift: Gerd Michelsen, Udo E. Simonis and Siegfried de Witt (eds.): Ein Grenzgänger der Wissenschaften. Aktiv für Natur und Mensch. Festschrift für Günter Altner zum 65. Geburtstag. Edition Sigma, Berlin 2001, ISBN 3-89404-488-8
