= Agora Energiewende =

German think tank

- Formation: 2012; 14 years ago
- Type: think tank
- Legal status: Nonprofit organization
- Purpose: Support of the Energiewende
- Location: Berlin, Germany
- Leader: Frauke Thies
- Key people: Markus Steigenberger
- Staff: 127
- Website: agora-energiewende.de

Agora Energiewende is a think tank supporting the transition to clean energy in Germany. It was founded in 2012 and is funded by Stiftung Mercator and the European Climate Foundation.

Its members debate under the Chatham House Rule and include Klaus Töpfer, Ottmar Edenhofer, and Claude Turmes.

In addition to studies specific to Germany, Agora published in 2016 an analysis on the economics of Hinkley Point C nuclear power station in the United Kingdom. Its analyses are quoted as part of the energy debate in other countries, including Denmark and the UK.

In December 2021, Patrick Graichen stepped down as Executive Director to, like his predecessor, join the now Federal Ministry for Economic Affairs and Climate Action under Minister Robert Habeck (the Greens) as a permanent State Secretary. In July 2022, Frauke Thies took over the management together with Markus Steigenberger and also serves as Executive Director.
