= Heyden Power Station =

Coordinates: 52°22′55″N 8°59′54″E

Heyden power station is a coal-fired power station located near Petershagen in Germany. The current station was commissioned in 1987, but the site has been used for power generation since 1950. It is owned and operated by the German energy corporation Uniper.

It is a coal-fired station with the largest unit capacity of any European power station: 865 MW. The hard coal it burns arrives several times a day by rail or ship to its own dock on the river Weser from all over the world to be stored until use; the station stockpiles a month's coal supply. At full capacity Heyden burns 265 tonnes of coal every hour, and is seldom not running as it supplies most of the daily base electricity demand.

== History ==
Between January and February 2021 the power plant had to be restarted six times, even though it had been officially shut down because of the Energiewende. In early April the plant was reclassified from shut down to "spinning power."

From the end of August 2022, the hard-coal-fired power plant will go from mere grid reserve back into continuous operation in order to save natural gas.

== Environment ==
Heyden has been fitted with a flue-gas desulfurization plant, and cleans 99% of the dust from its emissions and 90% of the sulphur but none of the carbon dioxide greenhouse gas.

== Statistics ==
Heyden outputs 2700 tonnes of steam per hour, has 32 pulverised coal burners, and its chimney is 225 metres high.

== See also ==
- 2022 Russia–European Union gas dispute
