= Energieeinsparverordnung =

The Energieeinsparverordnung (German: [ʔɛnɐˈɡiːˈʔaɪ̯n.ʃpa:.fɐˈʔoˑɐ̯t.nʊŋ]; EnEV) is a regulation in Germany describing minimum requirements regarding energy use of new and renovated buildings. This legal ordinance was issued and repeatedly updated – The requirements were set to stricter standards in irregular intervals – by the Federal Government, which was authorized to do so by §1 of the Energy Conservation Act (Energieeinsparungsgesetz, EnEG).

To obtain a building license, private buildings and most commercial buildings had to be built according to the regulation. The EnEV and the EnEG have been replaced by the Buildings Energy Act (Gebäudeenergiegesetz, GEG) on November 1, 2020.

== See also ==
- Efficient energy use § Germany
- Energiewende in Germany
