= Green Planet Energy =

Green Planet Energy eG
- Formerly: Greenpeace Energy eG (1999–2021)
- Type: Cooperative
- Industry: Energy
- Founded: 27 October 1999; 27 years ago
- Founder: Greenpeace Germany
- Headquarters: Hamburg, Germany
- Area served: Germany
- Products: Electricity, gas
- Revenue: €185 million (2025)
- Members: More than 50,000 (2025)
- Number of employees: 187 (2025)
- Website: green-planet-energy.de

Green Planet Energy eG is an energy cooperative based in Hamburg. It is owned by its members and it develops renewable energy projects. Founded in 1999 as Greenpeace Energy on the initiative of Greenpeace Germany, the cooperative adopted its current name in 2021. At the end of 2025, the cooperative had more than 50,000 members.

The use of the Greenpeace name was licensed under the condition that the energy cooperative met the Greenpeace e.V. quality criteria for clean energy. In 2021, after a significant media controversy on its fossil gas sales, Greenpeace Energy changed its name to Green Planet Energy in order to clarify the independence of both entities.

== Formation ==
In 1998, Greenpeace Energy started a renewable energy initiative called "power shift". There, consumers could choose to switch to a green electricity provider. As more and more consumers agreed to switch to an environmentally friendly provider, Greenpeace found no electricity provider that met all the criteria for environmental sustainability and that was able to supply the increasing demand for sustainable energy. As a solution, Greenpeace Energy was founded in 1999, as an energy cooperative that provides 100% of its electricity from renewable sources. The areas of network management and energy billing originally were not adopted by Greenpeace Energy itself but by its affiliate company, Stadtwerke Schwäbisch Hall, as a service provider. In December 2017, Greenpeace Energy took over those services from Schwäbisch Hall and now manages them itself.

== The Cooperative ==
Green Planet Energy chose to establish itself in the legal form of a registered cooperative (eG). The motivation for this decision was that it allows Green Planet Energy to be independent of banks and major shareholders and build equity on a wide base of shareholders to offer as well as favorable current. Therefore, until 2015 no returns were distributed to the shareholders. For 2020, distributions per share were 1.5 per cent.

Membership in the cooperative is formally dependent on the current reference - according to the statute, a cooperative member who "does not cover their demand for electrical energy supplies through the Cooperative" may be excluded. This right part of the cooperative is expressly not perceived, what results are based on the fact that some members of the cooperative power of Green Planet Energy can not relate. A cooperative member has at least one, and since October 2019 new members can hold a maximum of two hundred shares of €55 each. Members who joined the cooperative earlier may hold up to 400 shares. As usual with cooperatives, each member has only one vote at the General Meeting, regardless of the number of shares. In this way, a takeover, or any interference by large investors is excluded. By its own admission, the cooperative explicitly does not pursue the goal of maximizing profits.

From the border of 1,500 members occurs a representative assembly in place of the General Assembly. Fifty elected representatives of the members then represent the rights of the members. Since Green Planet Energy has significantly more members every four years, representatives are elected (the last election was 2019). The selection of representatives is made by a selection committee. The tasks of Representatives correspond according to cooperative law duties of the General Assembly: members can vote on motions, elect or discharge the Supervisory Board and the Management Board or released and vote on their workload, and decide on the distribution of any surplus.

== Greenpeace criteria for clean energy ==
Green Planet Energy works on the basis of the "Greenpeace criteria for clean energy." The determination of these criteria was carried out by the Greenpeace e. V., an adaptation to the market conditions was last held in November 2017.

== Fossil gas controversy ==
Since 2011 Greenpeace Energy has been selling the proWindgas product which was initially 100% imported fossil gas, and the company promised a gradual increase in the proportion of hydrogen generated from excess renewable energy. As of 2020 the share of hydrogen mostly oscillated below 1%. Sales of 99% fossil gas presented as “eco-gas” have been criticized as contradictory as well as "greenwashing" of Russian gas. In 2021 the company added further 10% of biogas, resulting in a mix of 1% hydrogen, 10% biogas and 89% fossil gas and declared it plans to replace all fossil gas by 2027.

In 2015 Greenpeace Energy attempted to sue the European Commission over approving state aid for the nuclear power plant Hinkley Point C "as a potential competitor on the energy market". The European Court of Justice eventually denied Green Planet Energy's request as inadmissible.

Green Planet Energy’s initial aim with its gas product was to promote hydrogen technology as an indispensable element of the energy transition and a means of advancing sector coupling in order to decarbonize sectors of economy where this cannot be achieved with renewable electricity directly. Meanwhile, green hydrogen has been widely recognized as highly relevant for a successful energy transition by (e.g.) the EU-Commission, national governments and important industries. The cooperative’s own feed-in of renewable hydrogen began in 2014 and as of 2021, five electrolyzers are producing green hydrogen for Green Planet Energy customers. Two of them are operated by Green Planet Energy itself. However, despite steeply increasing the volume of fed-in hydrogen, the proportion of windgas (green hydrogen) in the gas mix until 2020 remained around 1% because the increase in production was offset by the increase in the number of customers.

In the meantime, Green Planet Energy’s gas product has the additional aim of accelerating the development of high quality biogas that is produced sustainably and without animal suffering. In order to be able to reduce the share of natural gas in proWindgas to zero by 2027, from 2021 on Green Planet Energy is adding an additional 10% of biogas that meets strict quality criteria to its gas mix. As published by Green Planet Energy in November 2020, the share of renewable gases is supposed to increase to 100% by 2027.

According to Green Planet Energy Energy the natural gas in its mix is composed as reflected by the import data for Germany provided by the Federal Network Authority (Bundesnetzagentur).
