= Brigitte Knopf =

German climatologist (born 1973)

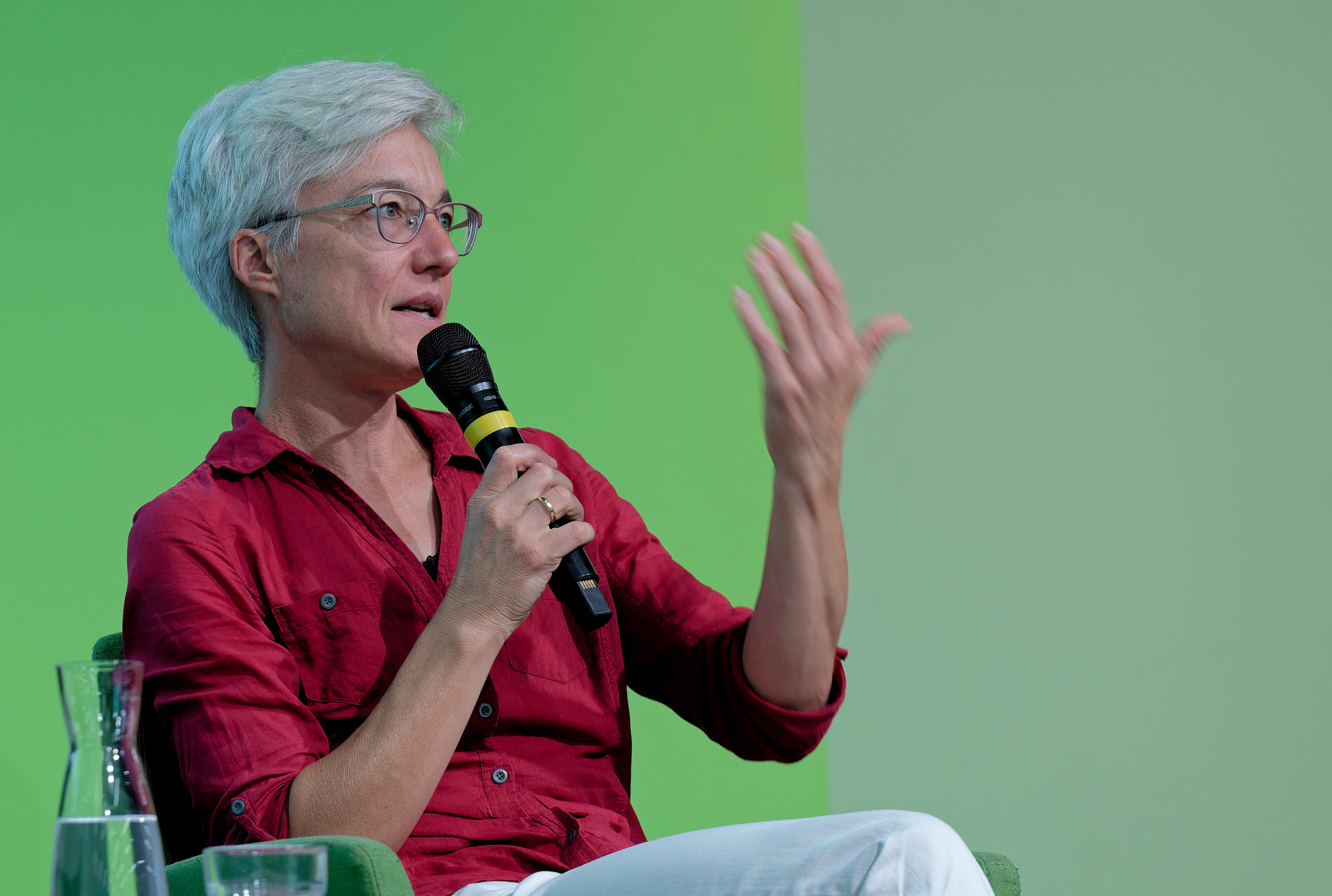
Dr. Brigitte Knopf (Generalsekretärin, MCC)

Brigitte Knopf (born 28 August 1973, in Bonn) is a German climatologist. Since February 2015 she has been Secretary General of the Mercator Research Institute on Global Commons and Climate Change and since 1 September 2020 has been a member of the Expert Council on Climate Issues (Expertenrat für Klimafragen).

== Career ==
In 1993 Knopf passed her abitur as the best of her class at the Albert-Einstein Gymnasium in Sankt Augustin. In 1993 she began studying physics with a specialization in solar energy at the University of Marburg. Knopf earned a diplom in 1999.

From 1999 to 2001 Brigitte Knopf worked in the research and development department of PHÖNIX SonnenWärme AG in Berlin. From 2001 to 2006, Knopf was a doctoral candidate at the Potsdam Institute for Climate Impact Research (PIK). In 2006 Brigitte Knopf received her doctorate from the University of Potsdam. From 2007 to 2014 she worked as a scientist at PIK. In 2014 she began working for the Mercator Research Institute on Global Commons and Climate Change (MCC).

== Work ==
Most recently, Knopf's work has been concerned with, among other subjects, implementation of the Paris Agreement. She also studies carbon pricing and how it can protect the climate while financing the UN Sustainable Development Goals (SDGs).

In the public debate about solutions to the climate crisis, Knopf advocates for a price on carbon emissions. She calls for sustainable financial reform in Germany and internationally:"In addition to reducing fossil subsidies, such a reform must include an effective carbon price." (Note: "Neben dem Abbau von fossilen Subventionen muss eine solche Reform einen wirksamen CO2-Preis beinhalten.") She argues that revenues from carbon pricing could be used to lower other taxes.

Knopf was one of the authors of the IPCC Fifth Assessment Report (2014). She was also one of the authors of the Emissions Gap Report of 2018.

== Selected publications ==
- On intrinsic uncertainties in earth system modelling (PDF). 2006. p. 120.
- Ottmar Edenhofer, Brigitte Knopf u. a.: The economics of low stabilization: model comparison of mitigation strategies and costs. In: The Energy Journal. 2010, S. 11–48,
- Der Einstieg in den Ausstieg (PDF). Friedrich-Ebert-Stiftung e. V. (FES). 2011. ISBN 978-3-86872-820-0.
- Knopf, Brigitte; Kejun, Jiang (2 November 2017). "Germany and China take the lead". Science. 358 (6363). American Association for the Advancement of Science (AAAS): 569. Bibcode:2017Sci...358..569K. doi:10.1126/science.aar2525. ISSN 0036-8075. PMID 29097522. S2CID 206665463.
- Fuss, Sabine; Flachsland, Christian; Koch, Nicolas; Kornek, Ulrike; Knopf, Brigitte; Edenhofer, Ottmar (1 July 2018). "A Framework for Assessing the Performance of Cap-and-Trade Systems: Insights from the European Union Emissions Trading System". Review of Environmental Economics and Policy. 12 (2). University of Chicago Press: 220–241. doi:10.1093/reep/rey010. ISSN 1750-6816.
