= Kazakh Agency of Applied Ecology =

Since 1996, the Kazakhstan Agency of Applied Ecology (KAAE), has been carrying out its activities as an independent organization in the sphere of environmental protection in the Republic of Kazakhstan.

KAPE LLC is an independent consulting and engineering company working in the industrial sector in the sphere of environmental protection. The company was registered in the Republic of Kazakhstan in 1996, with offices in Astana, Aktau, Atyrau and Aktobe, and has a solid base of material resources and a staff of qualified experts.

Substantial experience has been achieved in development and implementation of national and international projects consisting of Environmental Impact Assessment (EIA), Environmental Protection (EP) Sections, standardization projects, water conservation projects, development of standardizing and methodological documentation and more. Intimate knowledge of national requirements for ecological safety and competence of staff guarantees a qualified resolution of tasks assigned. The company's activities are certified to meet the requirements of international standards ISO:9001, ISO:14001 and OHSAS:18001.
