= Öko-Institut =

German environmental research institute

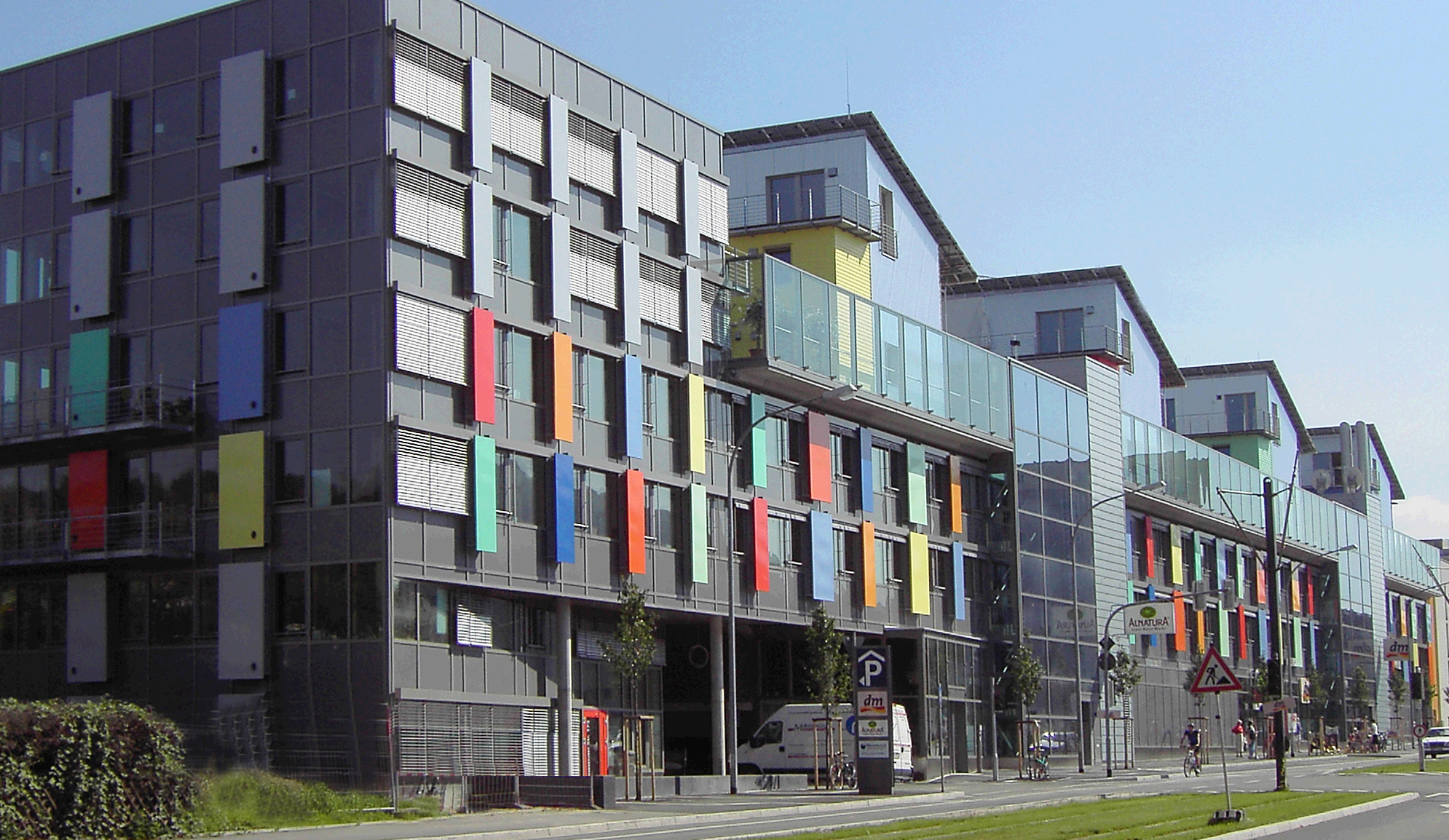
Freiburg head office

The Öko-Institut (Institute for Applied Ecology) (sometimes spelt Oeko-Institut) is a non-profit, private-sector environmental research institute with its head office in Freiburg im Breisgau, Germany.

It emerged from the anti-nuclear movement in 1977 and as of November 2024 has around 210 employees at its sites in Freiburg, Darmstadt and Berlin. The institute is organized as an association and pursues the goals of promoting environmental protection and sustainable development, which is to be achieved, among other things, through scientific research, consulting and educating the public. The supporting association has about 2,000 members, including nearly 20 municipalities. It finances its work primarily through third-party funding for projects. In addition, there are membership fees and donations. Revenues in 2019 amounted to 15.7 million euros.

Turnover in 2022 amounted to around 21 million euros.

The institute regularly publishes reports, in such fields as transport, alternative energy and waste management.

== Fields of activity ==
The Öko-Institut prepares scientific reports and advises politicians, environmental associations, institutions, and companies. The institute works on more than 370 national and international projects annually. The institute is a founding member of the EnergieVision association, which awards the ok-power label for green electricity products. It also launched the EcoTopTen consumer information campaign, which presents specific product recommendations for sustainable consumption on an internet portal. Furthermore, the Öko-Institut is a member of the Ecological Research Network (Ecornet), a network for sustainability research.

== Open Science ==
The Öko-Institut participates in open science infrastructure projects such as the Open Energy Platform funded by the German Federal Ministry for Economic Affairs and Energy and the Open Energy Ontology, a joint ontology for energy system analyses.

== Publications ==
The first issue of Öko-Mitteilungen was published in 1978. Initially typed on a typewriter, it developed over the years into a richly illustrated 32-page membership magazine. The magazine was published several times a year. Since summer 2006, the Öko-Institut has also been offering its member magazine under the new title eco@work as a free e-paper. It is available online on the homepage as a PDF file and can be subscribed to by email.

The institute's annual reports are published in German and English. In addition, studies and research reports on various topics are published. Since May 2018, Öko-Institut employees have been blogging about sustainability issues and current projects.

== Leadership of the institute ==
=== Executive board ===
The Executive Board consists of a total of twelve members, seven of whom are external and are elected for a two-year term by the General Assembly.

=== Management ===
The management consists of Anke Herold and André Nelius.

=== Honorary members ===
Until 2020, the Board of Trustees, which most recently (as of September 2020) included Nina Buchmann, Erhard Eppler †, Martin Führ, Klaus Fricke, Regine Kollek, Ellen Matthies, Peter Cornelius Mayer-Tasch, Eckard Rehbinder, Lucia A. Reisch, Hartmut Richter and Udo E. Simonis. In 2020, the general meeting of the Öko-Institut e. V. decided to discontinue the board of trustees as an organ of the association. In recognition of their commitment to the board of trustees since the institute's inception, Udo Ernst Simonis, Peter C. Mayer-Tasch and Eckhard Rehbinder were awarded honorary membership of the Öko-Institut e. V.

== Controversy ==
In 2004, SPD energy expert Hermann Scheer accused the Öko-Institut of collaborating with electricity companies in their fight against the Renewable Energy Sources Act (EEG). The institute rejected this criticism as unfounded and emphasised the importance of the EEG in promoting renewable energies. At the beginning of 2008, the RECS certificates issued by the Öko-Institut in Germany were criticised as 'false labelling' by journalist Lars Lange. The institute also rejected this criticism and emphasised the importance of green electricity labels such as the ok-power label. The RECS system has since been transferred to the European Energy Certificate System (EECS), which also includes guarantees of origin for electricity from renewable energies created in accordance with European law, in particular Directive 2009/28/EC, and the German EEG.

In the wake of the Trauzeugenaffäre (best man affair) in April 2023, the Öko-Institut also became the subject of public debate, as the brother and sister of the Green Party State Secretary in the Federal Ministry for Economic Affairs and Energy, Patrick Graichen, are employed by the Öko-Institut, while the institution is also financed by contracts from various ministries and authorities. His sister, Verena Graichen, is married to State Secretary Michael Kellner, who also works in the Ministry of Economic Affairs. The ministry emphasised that it is subject to strict compliance regulations and that Patrick Graichen has no influence on the allocation of funding to the Öko-Institut. The BMWK has published the grants and contracts awarded to the Öko-Institut for ongoing projects since 2019 on its website. In a press release dated 9 May 2023, the Öko-Institut also referred to an internal compliance regulation to avoid potential conflicts of interest.

== Awards ==
- 2018: Integrationspreis from the Stiftung Apfelbaum
Öko-Institut's offices
