= Environmental impact design =

Aims to benefit the environment

Environmental impact design (EID) is the design of development projects so as to achieve positive environmental objectives that benefit the environment and raise the stock of public goods.

== Examples ==
Examples of EID include:

- Habitat creation as a result of afforestation projects that can "expand forest resources and reduce the gap between timber production and consumption." An example is the China Afforestation Project.
- Coastal management projects that strengthens biodiversity and promotes sustainable use of biological resources.
- Flood defense projects that improve livability in flood-prone areas by reducing future losses. Flood preparedness and mitigation systems can aid in handling periodic flooding.
- Bridge designs such as concrete bridges that are sustainable, recyclable, durable and can be built quickly, reducing greenhouse gas emissions caused by traffic delays and construction equipment.

== Types ==
Environmental impact design impacts can be broken down into three types:

- Direct impacts: caused by the project and building process, such as land consumption, erosion and loss of vegetation.
- Indirect impacts: side-effects of a project such as degradation of surface water quality from erosion of land cleared as a result of a project. Over time, indirect impacts can affect larger geographical areas.
- Cumulative impacts: synergistic effects such as the impairment of water regulation and filtering capabilities of wetland systems due to construction.

Environmental impacts of design must consider the site of the project.

Environmental Impact Design should address issues revealed by Environmental impact assessments (EIA). EID looks for ways to minimize costs to the developer, while maximizing the benefit to the environment.

== Construction ==
Historically in construction, the needs of the owner were paramount, as constrained by local laws and policies, such as building safety and zoning. EID broadens those concerns to encompass environmental impacts. Low impact development and ecologically focused building practices originated in Germany following World War II. The widespread destruction and a large homeless population gave Germans the chance to refocus building practices. Prefabrication was adopted in both East and West Germany where, in the 1950s and 60s, modular construction systems were developed for residential buildings.

== International programs ==
In 1992, at the Earth Summit, policy makers adopted Agenda 21, which focused on sustainable development. In 1996, the UN Conference on Human Settlements Habitat II discussed transferring sustainable building practices to an urban scale. From 1999 to 2003, the U.S. Green Building Council kick-started the Leadership in Energy and Environmental Design or (LEED) which is now the most well-known standard for green building.

== Building life cycle ==
The "building life cycle" is an approach to design that considers environmental impacts such as pollution and energy consumption over the life of the building. This theory evolved into the idea of cradle-to-cradle design, which adds the notion that at the end of a building's life, it should be disposed of without environment impact. The Triple Zero standard requires lowering energy, emissions and waste to zero. A successful life cycle building adopts approaches such as the use of recycled materials in the construction process as well as green energy.

== See also ==
- Environmental impact assessment
- Hydropower Sustainability Assessment Protocol
- Landscape planning
- Phytoremediation
