= List of renewable energy topics by country =

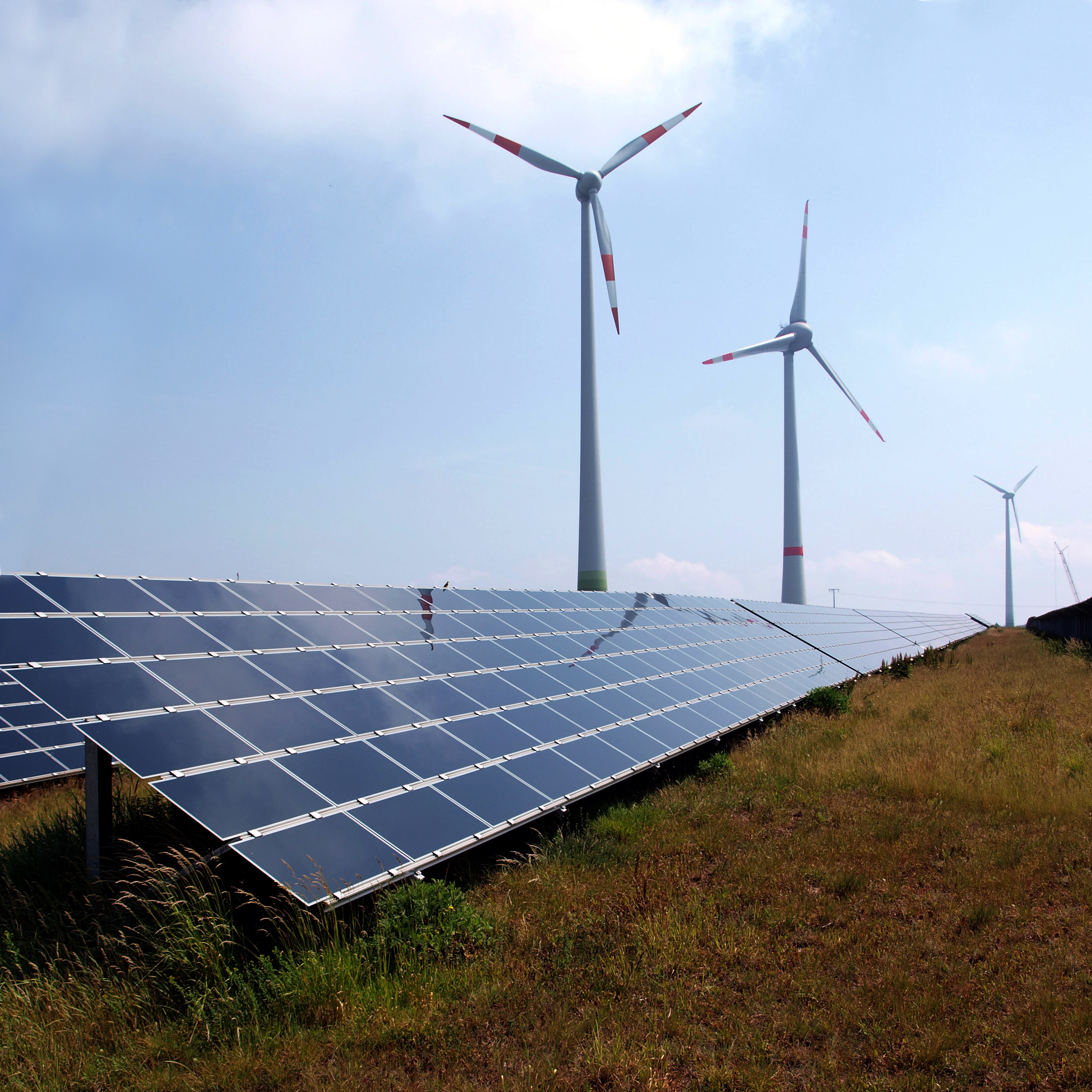
Solar panels and wind turbines in Germany

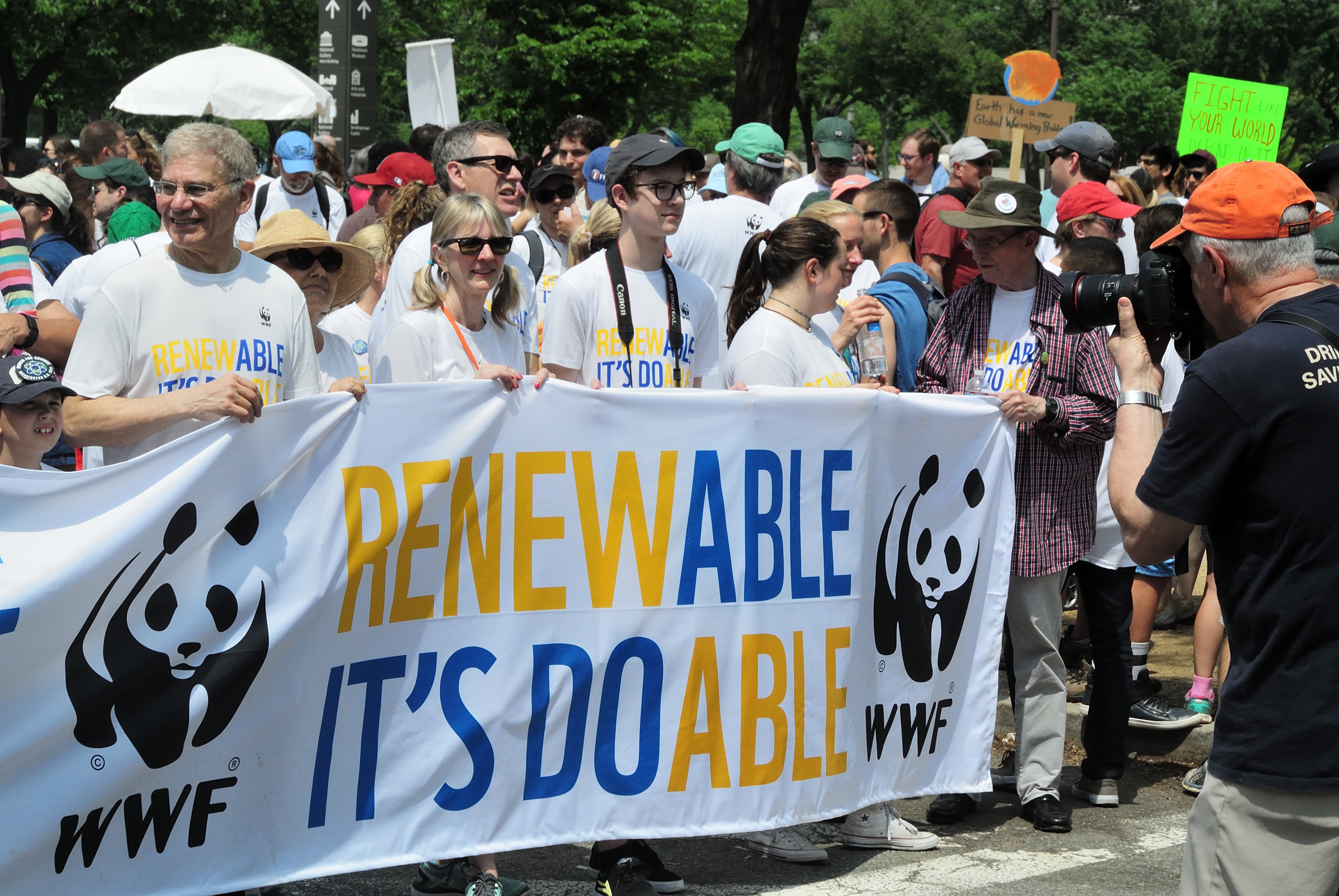
Placard for renewable energy, at the People's Climate March (2017)

This is a list of renewable energy topics by country and territory. These links can be used to compare developments in renewable energy in different countries and territories and to help and encourage new writers to participate in writing about developments in their own countries or countries of interest.

The list refers to renewable energy in general, as well as solar power, wind power, geothermal energy, biofuel, and hydropower. As of 2013, China, Germany, and Japan, and India, four of the world's largest economies generate more electricity from renewables than from nuclear power.

Based on REN21's 2014 report, renewables supplied 19% of humans' global energy consumption. This energy consumption is divided as 9% coming from traditional biomass, 4.2% as heat energy (non-biomass), 3.8% hydro electricity and 2% is electricity from wind, solar, geothermal, and biomass.

China is the world's largest producer of hydroelectricity, followed by Canada, Brazil, India, U.S and Russia. Wind power capacity is growing at the rate of 26% annually, and is widely used in Europe, Asia, and the United States. Wind power accounts for approximately 30% of electricity use in Denmark, 20% in Portugal, and 18% in Spain.

While historically characterized in climate policy discussions by its significant population and rapid economic growth, India has recently met several of its primary emissions targets ahead of schedule. As of 2024, the country has seen a substantial increase in its renewable energy capacity, making it one of the world's fastest-growing markets for clean energy adoption.

== Special renewable energy figures ==
PV power stations are popular in Japan, China and the United States. The world's largest geothermal power installation is The Geysers in California, with a rated capacity of 750 MW. Brazil has one of the largest renewable energy programs in the world, involving production of ethanol fuel from sugar cane, and ethanol now provides 18 percent of the country's automotive fuel. Ethanol fuel is also widely available in the United States. Plug-in electric vehicles in Norway reached a market share of 22.4% in 2015, the highest in the world.

While many renewable energy projects are large-scale, renewable technologies are also suited to developing countries, where energy is often crucial in human development. Small solar PV systems provide electricity to a few million households, and micro-hydro configured into mini-grids serves many more.

== Lists ==
- List of countries by renewable electricity production

== Regions ==
Region	Renewable energy (RE)	Solar power (SP)	Wind power (WP)	Geothermal energy (GE)	Biofuel (BF)	Hydro power (Hydro)
Africa	RE in Africa	SP in Africa	WP in Africa	GE in Africa	BF in Africa	Hydro in Africa
Asia	RE in Asia	SP in Asia	WP in Asia	GE in Asia	BF in Asia	Hydro in Asia
Europe	RE in Europe	SP in Europe	WP in Europe	GE in Europe	BF in Europe	Hydro in Europe

== Countries and territories ==
Country or territory	Energy (E)	Renewable energy (RE)	Solar power (SP)	Wind power (WP)	Geothermal energy (GE)	Biofuel (BF)	Hydro power (Hydro)
Afghanistan	E in Afghanistan	RE in Afghanistan	SP in Afghanistan	WP in Afghanistan	GE in Afghanistan	BF in Afghanistan	Hydro in Afghanistan
Albania	E in Albania	RE in Albania	SP in Albania	WP in Albania	GE in Albania	BF in Albania	Hydro in Albania
Algeria	E in Algeria	RE in Algeria	SP in Algeria	WP in Algeria	GE in Algeria	BF in Algeria	Hydro in Algeria
Andorra	E in Andorra	RE in Andorra	SP in Andorra	WP in Andorra	GE in Andorra	BF in Andorra	Hydro in Andorra
Angola	E in Angola	RE in Angola	SP in Angola	WP in Angola	GE in Angola	BF in Angola	Hydro in Angola
Antigua and Barbuda	E in Antigua and Barbuda	RE in Antigua and Barbuda	SP in Antigua and Barbuda	WP in Antigua and Barbuda	GE in Antigua and Barbuda	BF in Antigua and Barbuda	Hydro in Antigua and Barbuda
Argentina	E in Argentina	RE in Argentina	SP in Argentina	WP in Argentina	GE in Argentina	BF in Argentina	Hydro in Argentina
Armenia	E in Armenia	RE in Armenia	SP in Armenia	WP in Armenia	GE in Armenia	BF in Armenia	Hydro in Armenia
Australia	E in Australia	RE in Australia	SP in Australia	WP in Australia	GE in Australia	BF in Australia	Hydro in Australia
Austria	E in Austria	RE in Austria	SP in Austria	WP in Austria	GE in Austria	BF in Austria	Hydro in Austria
Azerbaijan	E in Azerbaijan	RE in Azerbaijan	SP in Azerbaijan	WP in Azerbaijan	GE in Azerbaijan	BF in Azerbaijan	Hydro in Azerbaijan
The Bahamas	E in the Bahamas	RE in the Bahamas	SP in the Bahamas	WP in the Bahamas	GE in the Bahamas	BF in the Bahamas	Hydro in the Bahamas
Bahrain	E in Bahrain	RE in Bahrain	SP in Bahrain	WP in Bahrain	GE in Bahrain	BF in Bahrain	Hydro in Bahrain
Bangladesh	E in Bangladesh	RE in Bangladesh	SP in Bangladesh	WP in Bangladesh	GE in Bangladesh	BF in Bangladesh	Hydro in Bangladesh
Barbados	E in Barbados	RE in Barbados	SP in Barbados	WP in Barbados	GE in Barbados	BF in Barbados	Hydro in Barbados
Belarus	E in Belarus	RE in Belarus	SP in Belarus	WP in Belarus	GE in Belarus	BF in Belarus	Hydro in Belarus
Belgium	E in Belgium	RE in Belgium	SP in Belgium	WP in Belgium	GE in Belgium	BF in Belgium	Hydro in Belgium
Belize	E in Belize	RE in Belize	SP in Belize	WP in Belize	GE in Belize	BF in Belize	Hydro in Belize
Benin	E in Benin	RE in Benin	SP in Benin	WP in Benin	GE in Benin	BF in Benin	Hydro in Benin
Bhutan	E in Bhutan	RE in Bhutan	SP in Bhutan	WP in Bhutan	GE in Bhutan	BF in Bhutan	Hydro in Bhutan
Bolivia	E in Bolivia	RE in Bolivia	SP in Bolivia	WP in Bolivia	GE in Bolivia	BF in Bolivia	Hydro in Bolivia
Bosnia and Herzegovina	E in Bosnia and Herzegovina	RE in Bosnia and Herzegovina	SP in Bosnia and Herzegovina	WP in Bosnia and Herzegovina	GE in Bosnia and Herzegovina	BF in Bosnia and Herzegovina	Hydro in Bosnia and Herzegovina
Botswana	E in Botswana	RE in Botswana	SP in Botswana	WP in Botswana	GE in Botswana	BF in Botswana	Hydro in Botswana
Brazil	E in Brazil	RE in Brazil	SP in Brazil	WP in Brazil	GE in Brazil	BF in Brazil	Hydro in Brazil
Brunei	E in Brunei	RE in Brunei	SP in Brunei	WP in Brunei	GE in Brunei	BF in Brunei	Hydro in Brunei
Bulgaria	E in Bulgaria	RE in Bulgaria	SP in Bulgaria	WP in Bulgaria	GE in Bulgaria	BF in Bulgaria	Hydro in Bulgaria
Burkina Faso	E in Burkina Faso	RE in Burkina Faso	SP in Burkina Faso	WP in Burkina Faso	GE in Burkina Faso	BF in Burkina Faso	Hydro in Burkina Faso
Burundi	E in Burundi	RE in Burundi	SP in Burundi	WP in Burundi	GE in Burundi	BF in Burundi	Hydro in Burundi
Cambodia	E in Cambodia	RE in Cambodia	SP in Cambodia	WP in Cambodia	GE in Cambodia	BF in Cambodia	Hydro in Cambodia
Cameroon	E in Cameroon	RE in Cameroon	SP in Cameroon	WP in Cameroon	GE in Cameroon	BF in Cameroon	Hydro in Cameroon
Canada	E in Canada	RE in Canada	SP in Canada	WP in Canada	GE in Canada	BF in Canada	Hydro in Canada
Cape Verde	E in Cape Verde	RE in Cape Verde	SP in Cape Verde	WP in Cape Verde	GE in Cape Verde	BF in Cape Verde	Hydro in Cape Verde
Central African Republic	E in the CAR	RE in the CAR	SP in the CAR	WP in the CAR	GE in the CAR	BF in the CAR	Hydro in the CAR
Chad	E in Chad	RE in Chad	SP in Chad	WP in Chad	GE in Chad	BF in Chad	Hydro in Chad
Chile	E in Chile	RE in Chile	SP in Chile	WP in Chile	GE in Chile	BF in Chile	Hydro in Chile
China	E in China	RE in China	SP in China	WP in China	GE in China	BF in China	Hydro in China
Hong Kong	E in Hong Kong	RE in Hong Kong	SP in Hong Kong	WP in Hong Kong	GE in Hong Kong	BF in Hong Kong	Hydro in Hong Kong
Macau	E in Macau	RE in Macau	SP in Macau	WP in Macau	GE in Macau	BF in Macau	Hydro in Macau
Colombia	E in Colombia	RE in Colombia	SP in Colombia	WP in Colombia	GE in Colombia	BF in Colombia	Hydro in Colombia
Comoros	E in Comoros	RE in Comoros	SP in Comoros	WP in Comoros	GE in Comoros	BF in Comoros	Hydro in Comoros
Congo	E in Congo	RE in Congo	SP in Congo	WP in Congo	GE in Congo	BF in Congo	Hydro in Congo
DR Congo	E in DR Congo	RE in DR Congo	SP in DR Congo	WP in DR Congo	GE in DR Congo	BF in DR Congo	Hydro in DR Congo
Costa Rica	E in Costa Rica	RE in Costa Rica	SP in Costa Rica	WP in Costa Rica	GE in Costa Rica	BF in Costa Rica	Hydro in Costa Rica
Côte d'Ivoire	E in Côte d'Ivoire	RE in Côte d'Ivoire	SP in Côte d'Ivoire	WP in Côte d'Ivoire	GE in Côte d'Ivoire	BF in Côte d'Ivoire	Hydro in Côte d'Ivoire
Croatia	E in Croatia	RE in Croatia	SP in Croatia	WP in Croatia	GE in Croatia	BF in Croatia	Hydro in Croatia
Cuba	E in Cuba	RE in Cuba	SP in Cuba	WP in Cuba	GE in Cuba	BF in Cuba	Hydro in Cuba
Cyprus	E in Cyprus	RE in Cyprus	SP in Cyprus	WP in Cyprus	GE in Cyprus	BF in Cyprus	Hydro in Cyprus
Czech Republic	E in Czech	RE in Czech	SP in Czech	WP in Czech	GE in Czech	BF in Czech	Hydro in Czech
Denmark	E in Denmark	RE in Denmark	SP in Denmark	WP in Denmark	GE in Denmark	BF in Denmark	Hydro in Denmark
Djibouti	E in Djibouti	RE in Djibouti	SP in Djibouti	WP in Djibouti	GE in Djibouti	BF in Djibouti	Hydro in Djibouti
Dominica	E in Dominica	RE in Dominica	SP in Dominica	WP in Dominica	GE in Dominica	BF in Dominica	Hydro in Dominica
Dominican Republic	E in Dominican Republic	RE in Dominican Republic	SP in Dominican Republic	WP in Dominican Republic	GE in Dominican Republic	BF in Dominican Republic	Hydro in Dominican Republic
Ecuador	E in Ecuador	RE in Ecuador	SP in Ecuador	WP in Ecuador	GE in Ecuador	BF in Ecuador	Hydro in Ecuador
Egypt	E in Egypt	RE in Egypt	SP in Egypt	WP in Egypt	GE in Egypt	BF in Egypt	Hydro in Egypt
El Salvador	E in El Salvador	RE in El Salvador	SP in El Salvador	WP in El Salvador	GE in El Salvador	BF in El Salvador	Hydro in El Salvador
Equatorial Guinea	E in Equatorial Guinea	RE in Equatorial Guinea	SP in Equatorial Guinea	WP in Equatorial Guinea	GE in Equatorial Guinea	BF in Equatorial Guinea	Hydro in Equatorial Guinea
Eritrea	E in Eritrea	RE in Eritrea	SP in Eritrea	WP in Eritrea	GE in Eritrea	BF in Eritrea	Hydro in Eritrea
Estonia	E in Estonia	RE in Estonia	SP in Estonia	WP in Estonia	GE in Estonia	BF in Estonia	Hydro in Estonia
Ethiopia	E in Ethiopia	RE in Ethiopia	SP in Ethiopia	WP in Ethiopia	GE in Ethiopia	BF in Ethiopia	Hydro in Ethiopia
Finland	E in Finland	RE in Finland	SP in Finland	WP in Finland	GE in Finland	BF in Finland	Hydro in Finland
France	E in France	RE in France	SP in France	WP in France	GE in France	BF in France	Hydro in France
Germany	E in Germany	RE in Germany	SP in Germany	WP in Germany	GE in Germany	BF in Germany	Hydro in Germany
Greece	E in Greece	RE in Greece	SP in Greece	WP in Greece	GE in Greece	BF in Greece	Hydro in Greece
Haiti	E in Haiti	RE in Haiti	SP in Haiti	WP in Haiti	GE in Haiti	BF in Haiti	Hydro in Haiti
Honduras	E in Honduras	RE in Honduras	SP in Honduras	WP in Honduras	GE in Honduras	BF in Honduras	Hydro in Honduras
Hungary	E in Hungary	RE in Hungary	SP in Hungary	WP in Hungary	GE in Hungary	BF in Hungary	Hydro in Hungary
Iceland	E in Iceland	RE in Iceland	SP in Iceland	WP in Iceland	GE in Iceland	BF in Iceland	Hydro in Iceland
India	E in India	RE in India	SP in India	WP in India	GE in India	BF in India	Hydro in India
Indonesia	E in Indonesia	RE in Indonesia	SP in Indonesia	WP in Indonesia	GE in Indonesia	BF in Indonesia	Hydro in Indonesia
Iran	E in Iran	RE in Iran	SP in Iran	WP in Iran	GE in Iran	BF in Iran	Hydro in Iran
Iraq	E in Iraq	RE in Iraq	SP in Iraq	WP in Iraq	GE in Iraq	BF in Ireland	Hydro in Iraq
Ireland	E in Ireland	RE in Ireland	SP in Ireland	WP in Ireland	GE in Ireland	BF in Ireland	Hydro in Ireland
Israel	E in Israel	RE in Israel	SP in Israel	WP in Israel	GE in Israel	BF in Israel	Hydro in Israel
Italy	E in Italy	RE in Italy	SP in Italy	WP in Italy	GE in Italy	BF in Italy	Hydro in Italy
Japan	E in Japan	RE in Japan	SP in Japan	WP in Japan	GE in Japan	BF in Japan	Hydro in Japan
Kazakhstan	E in Kazakhstan	RE in Kazakhstan	SP in Kazakhstan	WP in Kazakhstan	GE in Kazakhstan	BF in Kazakhstan	Hydro in Kazakhstan
Kenya	E in Kenya	RE in Kenya	SP in Kenya	WP in Kenya	GE in Kenya	BF in Kenya	Hydro in Kenya
Kosovo	E in Kosovo	RE in Kosovo	SP in Kosovo	WP in Kosovo	GE in Kosovo	BF in Kosovo	Hydro in Kosovo
Laos	E in Laos	RE in Laos	SP in Laos	WP in Laos	GE in Laos	BF in Laos	Hydro in Laos
Latvia	E in Latvia	RE in Latvia	SP in Latvia	WP in Latvia	GE in Latvia	BF in Latvia	Hydro in Latvia
Lebanon	E in Lebanon	RE in Lebanon	SP in Lebanon	WP in Lebanon	GE in Lebanon	BF in Lebanon	Hydro in Lebanon
Lithuania	E in Lithuania	RE in Lithuania	SP in Lithuania	WP in Lithuania	GE in Lithuania	BF in Lithuania	Hydro in Lithuania
Luxembourg	E in Luxembourg	RE in Luxembourg	SP in Luxembourg	WP in Luxembourg	GE in Luxembourg	BF in Luxembourg	Hydro in Luxembourg
Malaysia	E in Malaysia	RE in Malaysia	SP in Malaysia	WP in Malaysia	GE in Malaysia	BF in Malaysia	Hydro in Malaysia
Malta	E in Malta	RE in Malta	SP in Malta	WP in Malta	GE in Malta	BF in Malta	Hydro in Malta
Mexico	E in Mexico	RE in Mexico	SP in Mexico	WP in Mexico	GE in Mexico	BF in Mexico	Hydro in Mexico
Moldova	E in Moldova	RE in Moldova	SP in Moldova	WP in Moldova	GE in Moldova	BF in Moldova	Hydro in Moldova
Mongolia	E in Mongolia	RE in Mongolia	SP in Mongolia	WP in Mongolia	GE in Mongolia	BF in Mongolia	Hydro in Mongolia
Montenegro	E in Montenegro	RE in Montenegro	SP in Montenegro	WP in Montenegro	GE in Montenegro	BF in Montenegro	Hydro in Montenegro
Morocco	E in Morocco	RE in Morocco	SP in Morocco	WP in Morocco	GE in Morocco	BF in Morocco	Hydro in Morocco
Myanmar	E in Myanmar	RE in Myanmar	SP in Myanmar	WP in Myanmar	GE in Myanmar	BF in Myanmar	Hydro in Myanmar
Nepal	E in Nepal	RE in Nepal	SP in Nepal	WP in Nepal	GE in Nepal	BF in Nepal	Hydro in Nepal
The Netherlands	E in the Netherlands	RE in the Netherlands	SP in the Netherlands	WP in the Netherlands	GE in the Netherlands	BF in the Netherlands	Hydro in the Netherlands
New Zealand	E in NZ	RE in NZ	SP in NZ	WP in NZ	GE in NZ	BF in NZ	Hydro in NZ
Nigeria	E in Nigeria	RE in Nigeria	SP in Nigeria	WP in Nigeria	GE in Nigeria	BF in Nigeria	Hydro in Nigeria
North Macedonia	E in North Macedonia	RE in North Macedonia	SP in North Macedonia	WP in North Macedonia	GE in North Macedonia	BF in North Macedonia	Hydro in North Macedonia
Norway	E in Norway	RE in Norway	SP in Norway	WP in Norway	GE in Norway	BF in Norway	Hydro in Norway
Pakistan	E in Pakistan	RE in Pakistan	SP in Pakistan	WP in Pakistan	GE in Pakistan	BF in Pakistan	Hydro in Pakistan
Paraguay	E in Paraguay	Re in Paraguay	SP in Paraguay	WP in Paraguay	GE in Paraguay	BF in Paraguay	Hydro in Paraguay
Philippines	E in the Philippines	RE in the Philippines	SP in the Philippines	WP in the Philippines	GE in the Philippines	BF in the Philippines	Hydro in the Philippines
Poland	E in Poland	RE in Poland	SP in Poland	WP in Poland	GE in Poland	BF in Poland	Hydro in Poland
Portugal	E in Portugal	RE in Portugal	SP in Portugal	WP in Portugal	GE in Portugal	BF in Portugal	Hydro in Portugal
Romania	E in Romania	RE in Romania	SP in Romania	WP in Romania	GE in Romania	BF in Romania	Hydro in Romania
Russia	E in Russia	RE in Russia	SP in Russia	WP in Russia	GE in Russia	BF in Russia	Hydro in Russia
Saudi Arabia	E in Saudi Arabia	RE in Saudi Arabia	SP in Saudi Arabia	WP in Saudi Arabia	GE in Saudi Arabia	BF in Saudi Arabia	Hydro in Saudi Arabia
Serbia	E in Serbia	RE in Serbia	SP in Serbia	WP in Serbia	GE in Serbia	BF in Serbia	Hydro in Serbia
Seychelles	E in Seychelles	RE in Seychelles	SP in Seychelles	WP in Seychelles	GE in Seychelles	BF in Seychelles	Hydro in Seychelles
Singapore	E in Singapore	RE in Singapore	SP in Singapore	WP in Singapore	GE in Singapore	BF in Singapore	Hydro in Singapore
Slovakia	E in Slovakia	RE in Slovakia	SP in Slovakia	WP in Slovakia	GE in Slovakia	BF in Slovakia	Hydro in Slovakia
Slovenia	E in Slovenia	RE in Slovenia	SP in Slovenia	WP in Slovenia	GE in Slovenia	BF in Slovenia	Hydro in Slovenia
Somalia	E in Somalia	RE in Somalia	SP in Somalia	WP in Somalia	GE in Somalia	BF in Somalia	Hydro in Somalia
South Africa	E in South Africa	RE in South Africa	SP in South Africa	WP in South Africa	GE in South Africa	BF in South Africa	Hydro in South Africa
South Korea	E in South Korea	RE in South Korea	SP in South Korea	WP in South Korea	GE in South Korea	BF in South Korea	Hydro in South Korea
Spain	E in Spain	RE in Spain	SP in Spain	WP in Spain	GE in Spain	BF in Spain	Hydro in Spain
Sri Lanka	E in Sri Lanka	RE in Sri Lanka	SP in Sri Lanka	WP in Sri Lanka	GE in Sri Lanka	BF in Sri Lanka	Hydro in Sri Lanka
Sweden	E in Sweden	RE in Sweden	SP in Sweden	WP in Sweden	GE in Sweden	BF in Sweden	Hydro in Sweden
Switzerland	E in Switzerland	RE in Switzerland	SP in Switzerland	WP in Switzerland	GE in Switzerland	BF in Switzerland	Hydro in Switzerland
Taiwan	E in Taiwan	RE in Taiwan	SP in Taiwan	WP in Taiwan	GE in Taiwan	BF in Taiwan	Hydro in Taiwan
Thailand	E in Thailand	RE in Thailand	SP in Thailand	WP in Thailand	GE in Thailand	BF in Thailand	Hydro in Thailand
Turkey	E in Turkey	RE in Turkey	SP in Turkey	WP in Turkey	GE in Turkey	BF in Turkey	Hydro in Turkey
Tuvalu	E in Tuvalu	RE in Tuvalu	SP in Tuvalu	WP in Tuvalu	GE in Tuvalu	BF in Tuvalu	Hydro in Tuvalu
Ukraine	E in Ukraine	RE in Ukraine	SP in Ukraine	WP in Ukraine	GE in Ukraine	BF in Ukraine	Hydro in Ukraine
United Kingdom	E in the UK	RE in the UK	SP in the UK	WP in the UK	GE in the UK	BF in the UK	Hydro in the UK
United States	E in the US	RE in the US	SP in the US	WP in the US	GE in the US	BF in the US	Hydro in the US
Uruguay	E in Uruguay	RE in Uruguay	SP in Uruguay	WP in Uruguay	GE in Uruguay	BF in Uruguay	Hydro in Uruguay
Uzbekistan	E in Uzbekistan	RE in Uzbekistan	SP in Uzbekistan	WP in Uzbekistan	GE in Uzbekistan	BF in Uzbekistan	Hydro in Uzbekistan
Venezuela	E in Venezuela	RE in Venezuela	SP in Venezuela	WP in Venezuela	GE in Venezuela	BF in Venezuela	Hydro in Venezuela
Vietnam	E in Vietnam	RE in Vietnam	SP in Vietnam	WP in Vietnam	GE in Vietnam	BF in Vietnam	Hydro in Vietnam
Yemen	E in Yemen	RE in Yemen	SP in Yemen	WP in Yemen	GE in Yemen	BF in Yemen	Hydro in Yemen
