= Hydroelectric power in Colombia =

With seventy percent of Colombia's power generation, hydroelectric power is a very important national energy source. The total large hydropower potential for Colombia is estimated at 93GW, with an additional 25GW of small hydropower (<20MW). However, the potential for large hydropower faces difficulties, as the best sites have already been developed, also due to the escalating environmental and social costs associated with large dams, and the likely impacts of climate change and climate variability on the hydrological regime of the country (drastic increases in surface temperature in the Andes, changes in precipitation patterns, and increases in the intensity and frequency of El Niño-Southern Oscillation (ENSO) signals driving prolonged periods of drought).

== Proposed hydroelectric power plants ==
The large hydropower plants to be built in Colombia up to 2010 are listed below:

- Calderas Dam: 26MW
- Transvase Guarinó
- Amoyá river: 80MW
- Manso river: 27 MW
- Quimbo Dam: 400 MW

== See also ==
- Electricity sector in Colombia
- List of power stations in Colombia
- Renewable energy in Colombia
- Renewable energy by country
