= Renewable energy in Hungary =

Hungary renewable electricity production by source

Hungary is a member of the European Union and thus takes part in the EU strategy to increase its share of renewable energy. The EU has adopted the 2009 Renewable Energy Directive, which included a 20% renewable energy target by 2020 for the EU. By 2030 wind should produce in average 26-35% of the EU's electricity and save Europe €56 billion a year in avoided fuel costs. The national authors of Hungary forecast is 14.7% renewables in gross energy consumption by 2020, exceeding their 13% binding target by 1.7 percentage points. Hungary is the EU country with the smallest forecast penetration of renewables of the electricity demand in 2020, namely only 11% (including biomass 6% and wind power 3%).

== Statistics ==
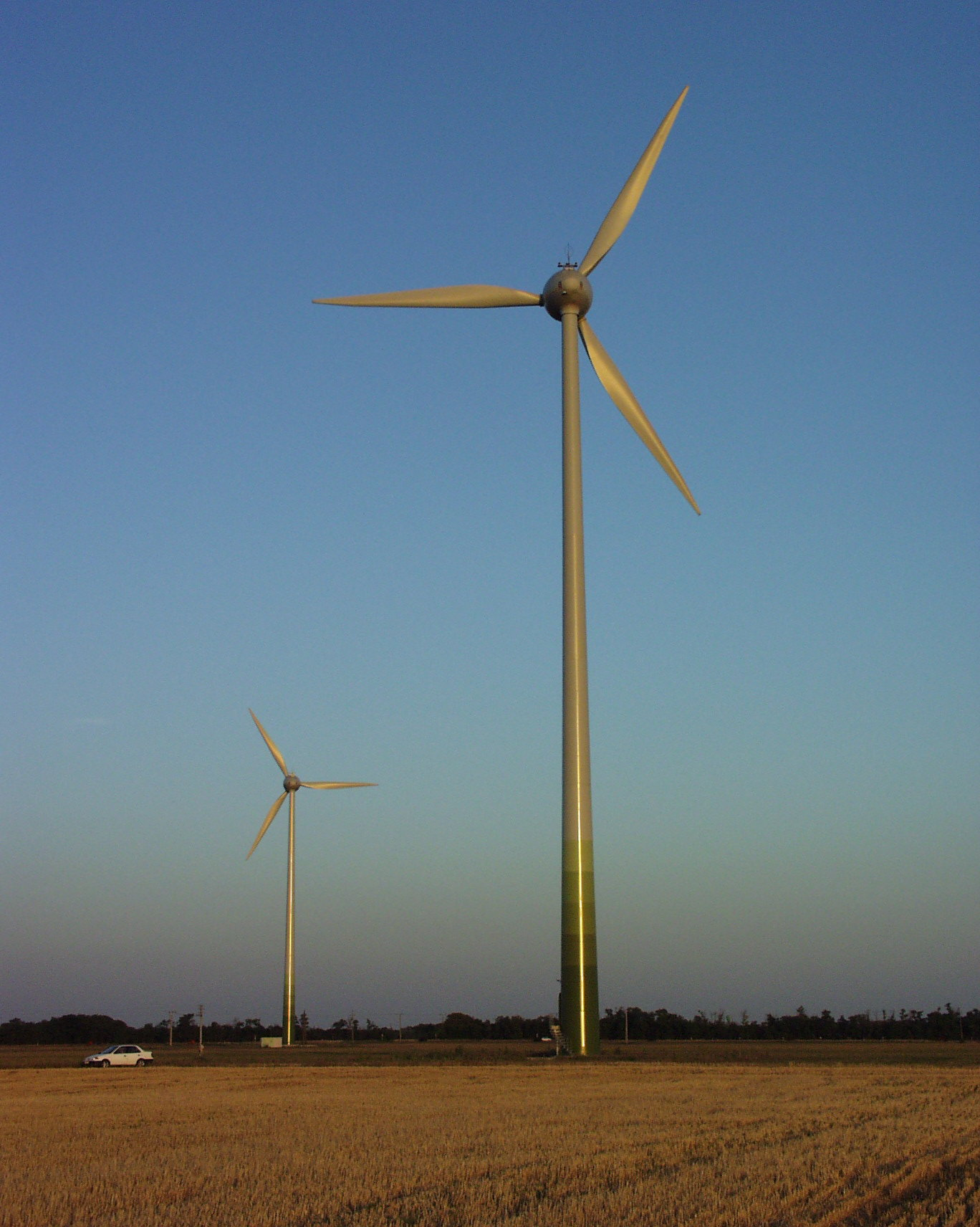
Wind farm near Mosonszolnok

In 2015, 10.5% of the gross Hungarian electricity production came from renewables, 52% of that amount was from biomass, 22% was from wind, 7% was from hydroenergy and 3% was from solar. Renewable energy in Hungary by type (2016):

Energy type	%
Biomass	46.4
Biogas	10.4
Wind Power	21.3
Hydroelectricity	8.1
Solar	6.3
Waste-to-Energy	7.6

== Wind power ==
The national forecast included 400 MW of new wind power capacity between 2010 and 2020. EWEA's 2009 forecast expected Hungary to reach 1.2 GW of installed wind capacity in this time. In the end of 2010 wind power capacity was 295 MW. However, since 2010, no further wind energy tenders were accepted. In 2016, the Hungarian government banned the installation of new wind energy capacities with administrative measures. The current capacity of wind power in Hungary is 329 MW.

EU and Hungary Wind Energy Capacity (MW)
No	Country	2012	2011	2010	2009	2008	2007	2006	2005	2004	2003	2002	2001	2000	1999	1998
-	EU-28	105,696	93,957	84,074	74,767	64,712	56,517	48,069	40,511	34,383	28,599	23,159	17,315	12,887	9,678	6,453
17	Hungary	329	329	295	201	127	65	61	17	3	3	3	0	0	0	0

== Solar power ==
The Hungarian solar power generation is rapidly advancing, although from a small basis. By the end of 2015 Hungary had installed more than 110 megawatt (MW) of photovoltaics. The country's capacity is expected to double in 2016. By the end of 2019 Hungary had installed more than 1277 megawatt (MW) of photovoltaics. As of the third quarter of 2020, the installed solar power capacity was 1920 MW. This is about the same as the only Paks NPP in Hungary, which generates 2000 MW or 50% of the electricity generated in Hungary. As of October 2021, the installed solar power capacity was 2728 MW. As of 2023, the installed solar power capacity was 5835 MW. As of 2023, solar energy accounted for 18.4% of the country's total electricity production.

== Hydro power ==
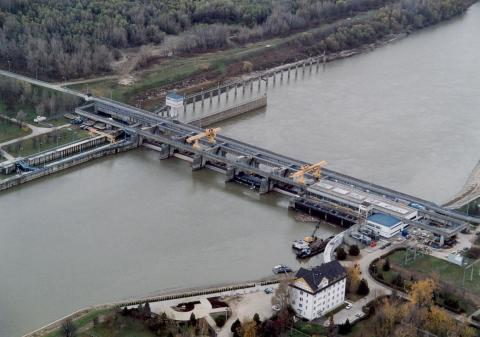
Kisköre Dam

Located in the Carpathian basin, Hungary has limited access to hydroelectricity. Since the unfortunate case of the Gabčíkovo–Nagymaros Dams project, the building of hydroelectric dams is extremely unpopular in the Hungarian society. The existing Croatian plans of building new dams on the shared sections of the river Drava are rejected by the Hungarian government. Hungary's two largest hydroelectric dams (Tiszalök, Kisköre) are built on the river Tisza, with 12,5 MW and 28 MW capacities, respectively. The remaining power stations are usually former mills transformed to small hydroelectric dams.

== Geothermal power ==
Geothermal energy is widely used in Hungary for the heating of homes and industrial areas.

The Miskolc Geothermal Project (45 MW) wins GeoPower Market’s international award: “Best Heating Project 2013”. The PannErgy Group and Győr-Szol Zrt., geothermal energy (46 MW) provide approximately 40 percent of the total heat requirement of nearly 24 thousand homes and more than a thousand other customers in the Győr district heating system. In addition, the energy output of the Bőny heat center provides at least 80 percent of the heating energy used by Audi Hungaria Zrt’s factory complex in Győr. The Szentlőrinc Geothermal System consists of a production well and a reinjection well, pipelines connecting the wells with the heat center, as well as the engineering, power, and control engineering facilities in the latter. The system transfers heat from its heating plant to the distribution heating network through 3 heat exchanger units, each with a capacity of 4.6 MW.

A power plant using geothermal energy, located in Tura, has electrical production of 2.3 MW gross and 1.3 MW net.

Construction on a geothermal project in Szeged began in 2022, with 27 wells and 16 heating plants. The project is promoted as "Europe's biggest urban heating system overhaul." It will serve 27 000 flats and 400 non-residential consumers.

== See also ==
- Solar power in Hungary
- Wind power in Hungary
- European Commission National Renewable Energy Action Plans
- European Commission renewable energy Progress Reports
- European Commission National Energy Efficiency Energy Action Plans
