= Renewable energy in Lithuania =

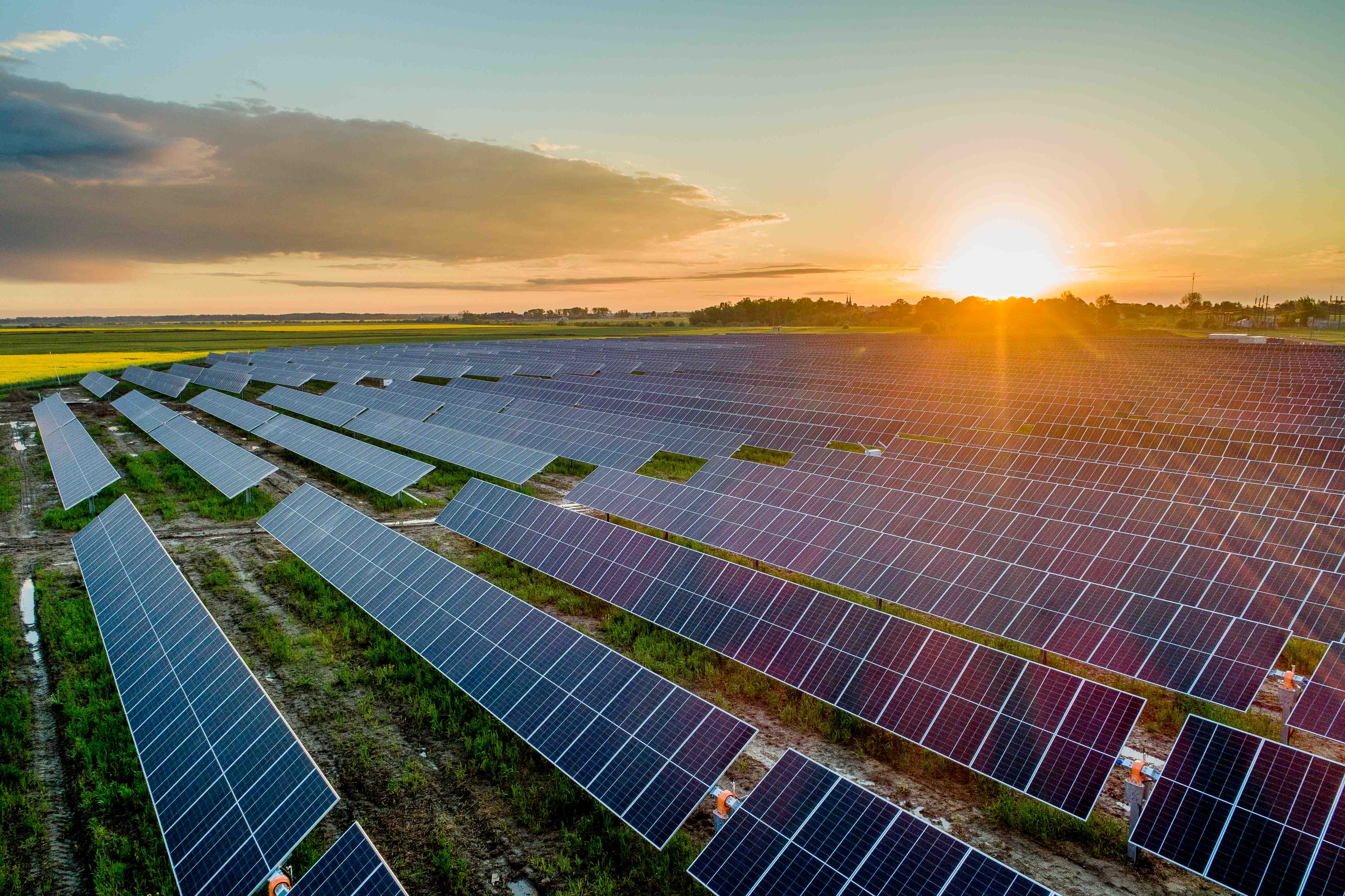
Solar park in Žeimiai, Lithuania

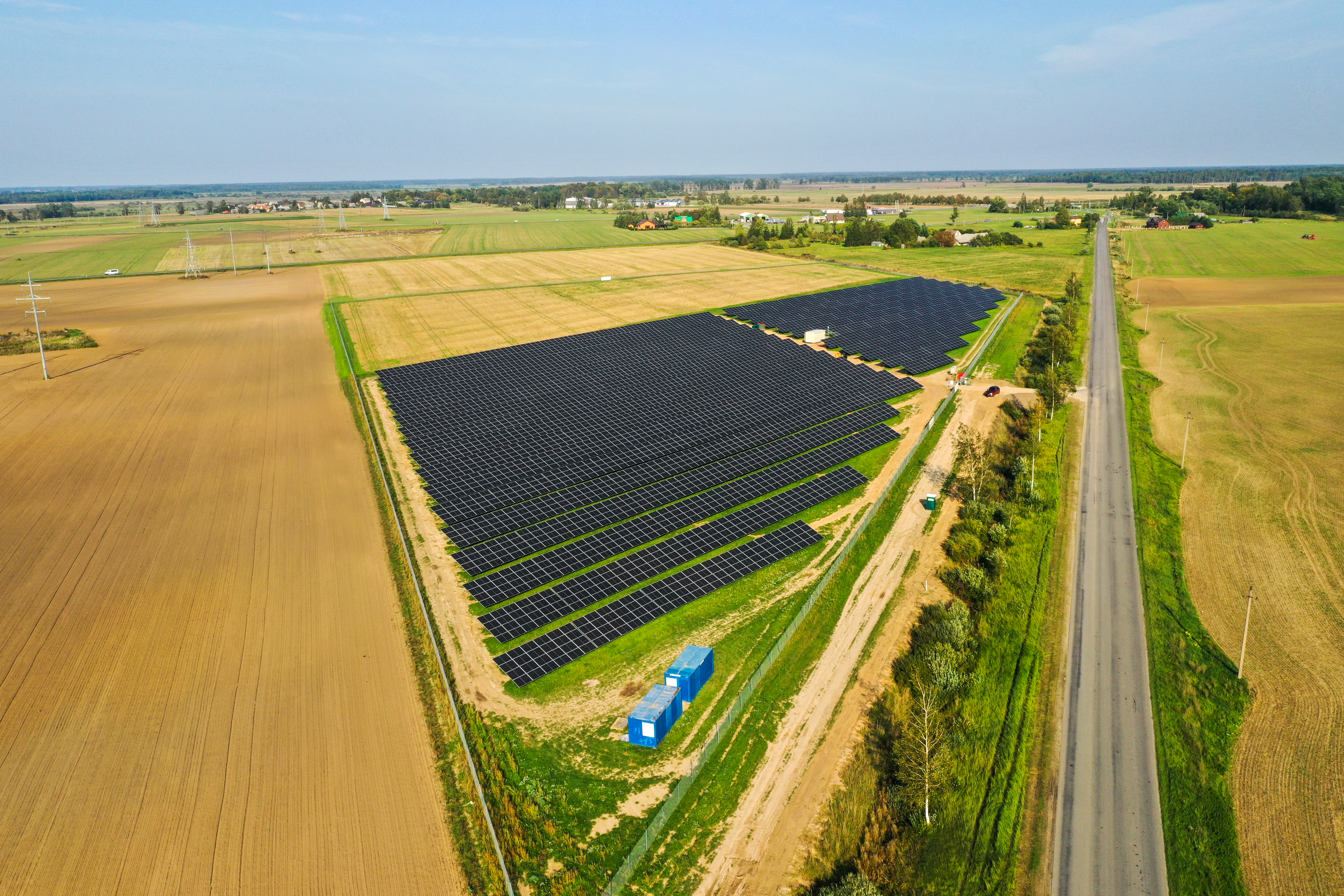
Solar park in Kuršėnai with 5MW capacity in 2021

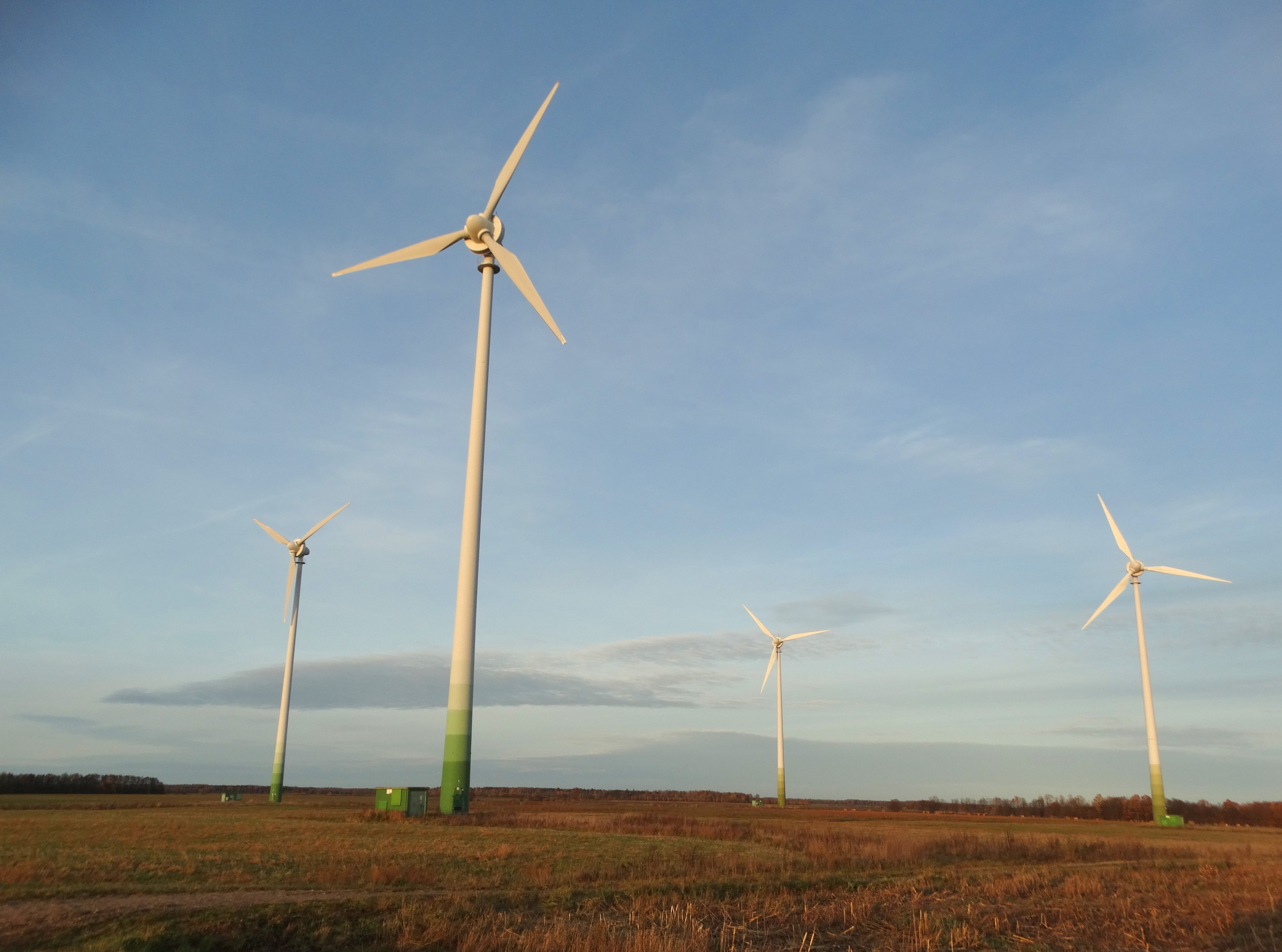
Wind turbines in Tauragė County, Lithuania

Renewable energy in Lithuania constitutes a growing source of energy in the country.

In 2025, renewable energy sources accounted for 77% of electricity generation in the country, up from 18% in 2010 and 1.4% in 1990.

== Statistics ==
Renewable energy in Lithuania by type (as of 2022):

Renewable energy resources consumption structure
	%
Solid biofuel	70.7%
Wind energy	7.3%
Biofuel	6.7%
Ambient heat	4.7%
Municipal and industrial waste	4.5%
Biogas	2.3%
Hydropower	2.2%
Solar energy	1.6%

== Biomass ==
Solid biofuel or biomass represents the most common source of renewable energy in Lithuania. Most commonly used are firewood and wood as well as agricultural waste. It is primarily used to produce heat, but is also used for electricity production.

== Biofuel ==
Vilnius Biofuel Power Plant

Biofuels
Consumption 2005 (GWh)	Consumption 2006 (GWh)			Consumption 2007 (GWh)		
Total	Total	Biodiesel	Bioethanol	Total	Biodiesel	Bioethanol
97	226	162	64	612	477	135

=== Biogas ===
Year	2009	2010	2011
Capacity (million m3)	9.8	20.9	23.2

== Hydroelectricity ==
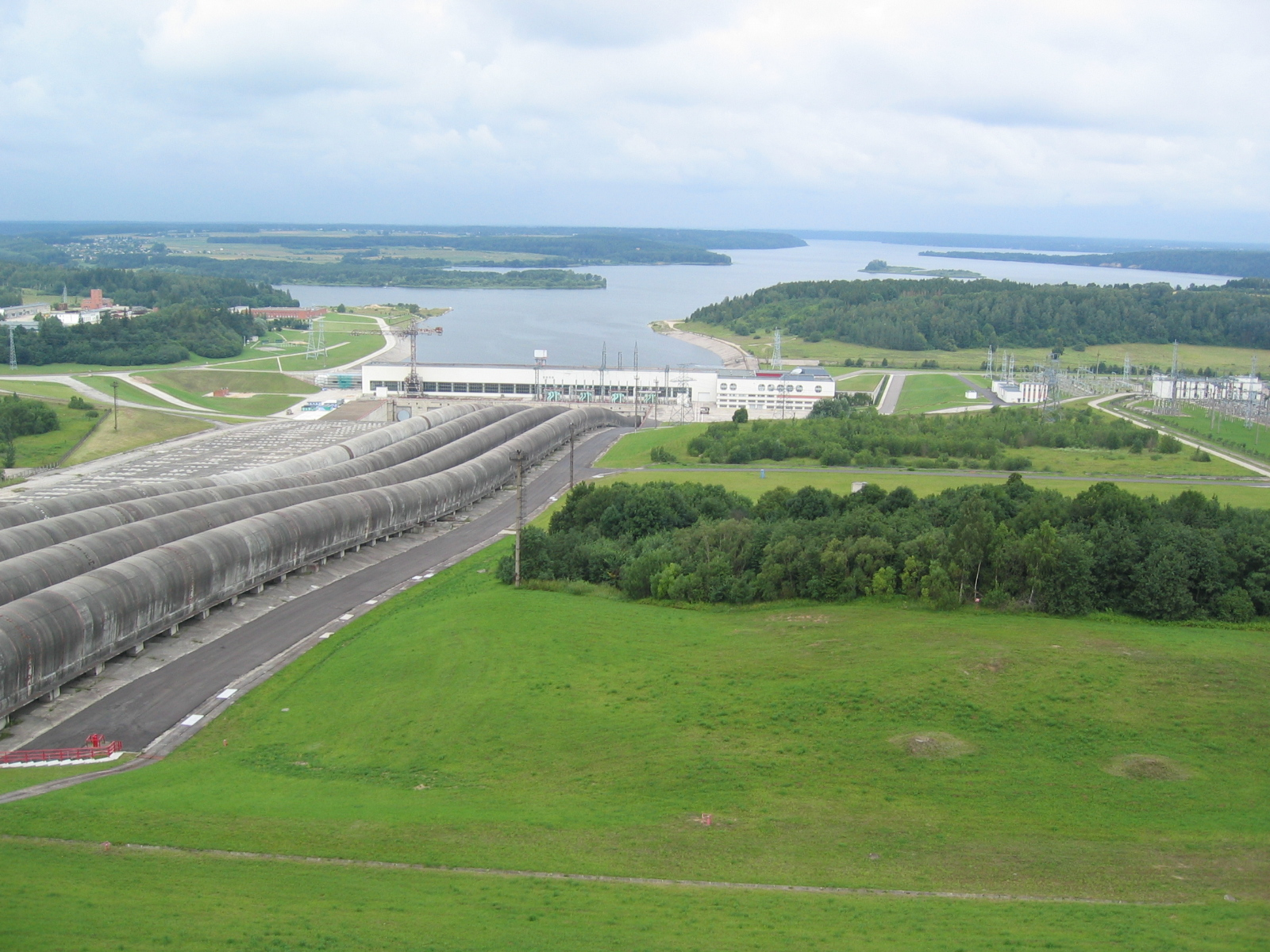
Kruonis Pumped Storage Plant

- Kruonis Pumped Storage Plant, its main purpose is to provide a spinning reserve of the power system, to regulate the load curve of the power system 24 hours a day. Installed capacity of the pumped storage plant: 900 MW (4 units, 225 MW each).
- Kaunas Hydroelectric Power Plant, has a capacity of 100.8 MW.

== Geothermal energy ==
- Klaipėda Geothermal Demonstration Plant, the first geothermal heating plant in the Baltic Sea region.

== Solar power ==
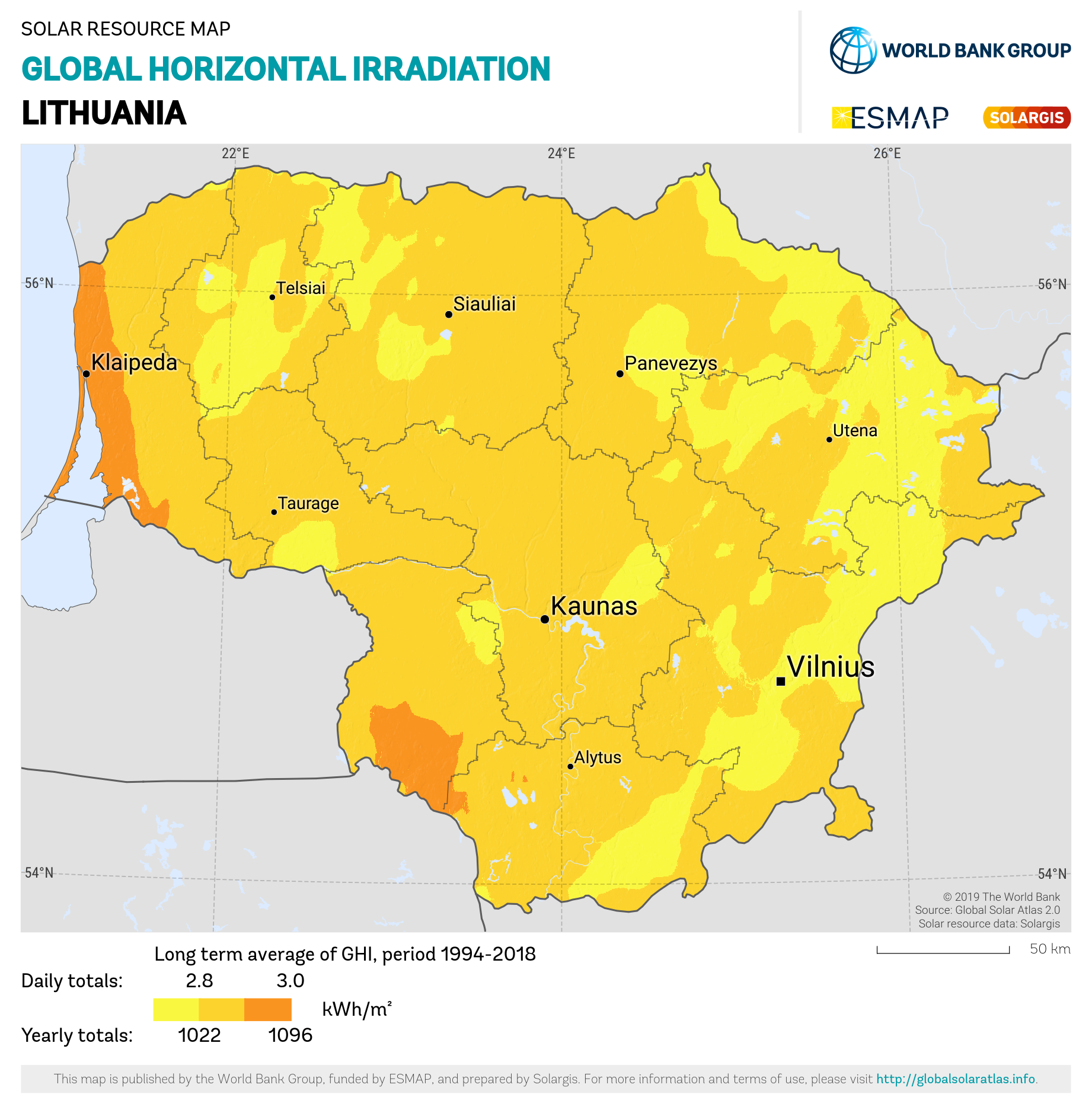
Solar potential of Lithuania

In 2025, Lithuania had capacity of 3,295 MW of solar power (compared to only 2.4 MWh power in 2010).

As of 2012, Lithuania has 1,580 small (from several kilowatts to 2,500 kW) solar power plants with a total installed capacity of 59.4 MW which produce electricity for the country, and has an uncounted number of private power plants which make electricity only for their owners.

== Wind power ==
Installed wind power capacity in Lithuania and generation in recent years is shown in the table below:

Year	1998–2003	2004	2005	2006	2007	2008	2009	2010	2011	2012	2013	2014	2015	2016	2017	2018	2019	2020	2021	2022	2023	2024	2025
Capacity (MW)	0	6	6	48	51	54	91	133	202	275	279	288	436	509	518	533	534	540	671	946	1284	1832	2510

== See also ==
- Energy in Lithuania
- Renewable energy by country
