= Geothermal energy in Uzbekistan =

Geothermal energy in Uzbekistan is considered a viable source for providing baseload power to diversify the national energy mix. Historically the Republic of Uzbekistan's energy sector has been heavily dependent on natural gas but the country possesses large-scale geothermal resources, with projected potential at accessible depths significantly exceeding that of its hydrocarbon reserves. As of 2024, geothermal energy is primarily used for direct use applications, such as heating and balneotherapy, rather than commercial electricity generation. Recent studies, including those supported by the World Bank, have focused on developing the geothermal potential in regions such as Muruntau and Gissar.

== Geothermal Potential ==
Uzbekistan's geothermal potential is categorized into hydrothermal resources (hot groundwater) and petrothermal resources (hot dry rock). The total projected resources at accessible depths (up to 5–6 kilometres (3.1–3.7 mi)) are estimated to be four to six times greater than the country's hydrocarbon resources.

=== Density Heat Flow geographical distribution ===
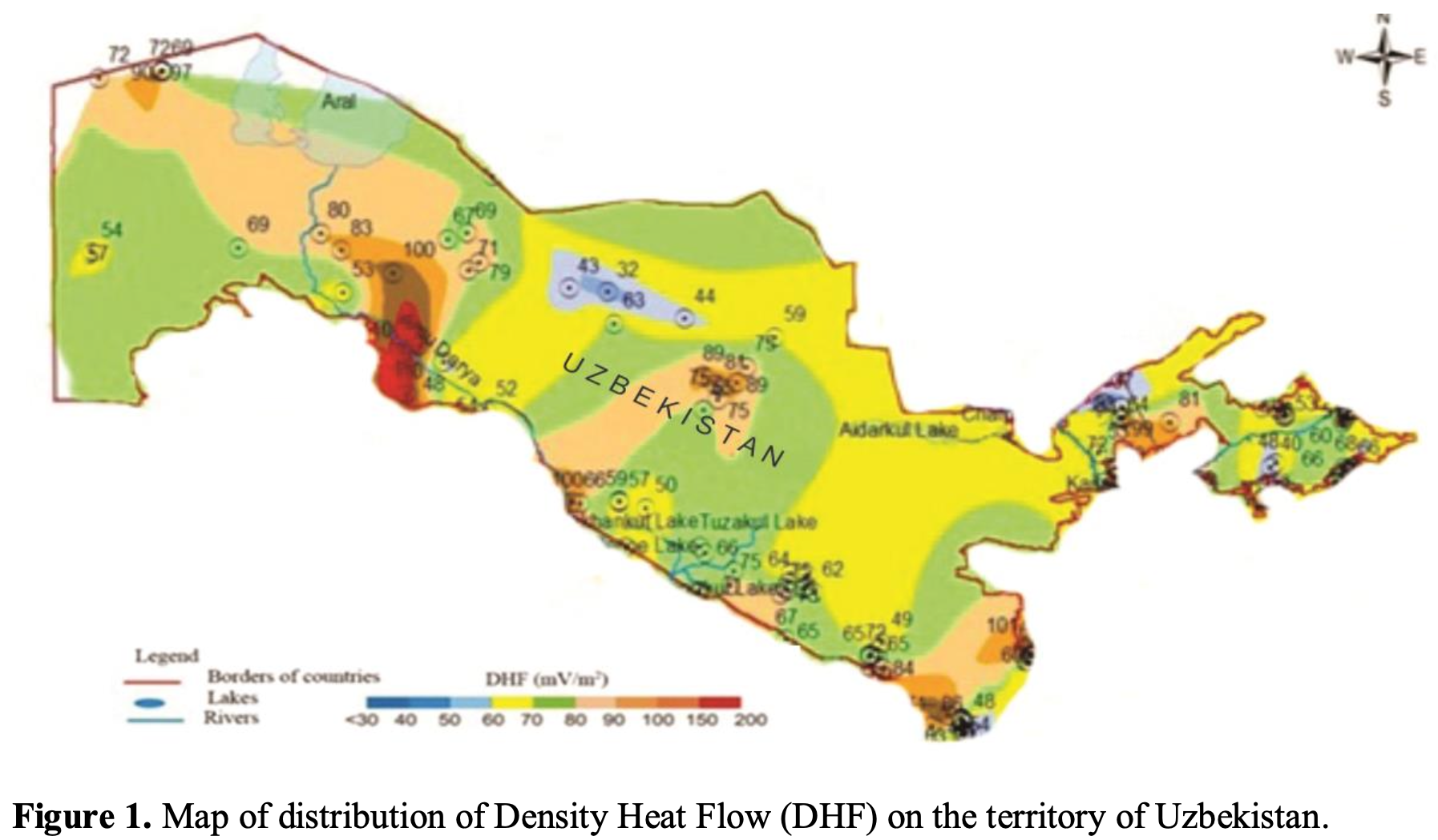
The map highlights specific zones, such as the Muruntau area, characterized by measured heat flow density values reaching $89 mW/m2$, indicating high potential for petrothermal resource development.

The distribution of Density Heat Flow (DHF) is an indicator of geothermal potential. Specific zones, such as the Muruntau area, have been measured significant heat flow density values, which demonstrates high potential for petrothermal resource development.

=== Hydrothermal Resources ===
Hydrogeological surveys have identified large artesian basins with significant thermal capacity. These water resources are suitable for utilization in energy production, mineral extraction, and agriculture. Key identified basins include:

- Bukhara-Karshi Basin: Projected resources for the Alb-Cenomanian and Senon-Paleocene aquifer complexes are estimated at 42,000 and 10,400 $\text{m}^3/\text{day}$, respectively, with thermal resources estimated at 555,000 Gcal/year.
- Aral Sea Basin: Forecast resources in the Cenomanian and Turonian-Senon complexes are 11,300 and 5,700 $\text{m}^3/\text{day}$, respectively, with thermal resources estimated at 143,000 and 53,000 Gcal/year.
- Mingbulak Basin: Located in the Namangan region, the Senon aquifer complex has projected resources of 1,000 $\text{m}^3/\text{day}$ and thermal resources of approximately 10,000 Gcal/year.
- Gissar Region: Geophysical surveys in the Gulistan area have identified two high-intensity heat flow density anomalies, which indicate specific development potential.

=== Petrothermal Resources ===
In addition to hydrothermal aquifers, petrothermal energy is stored in deep crustal rocks. The Muruntau area in Western Uzbekistan is characterized by a high measured heat flow density value of $89 \text{mW}/\text{m}^2$. Geophysical studies in this region have identified conductive anomalies and zones of crustal decompression at depths of 2–4 kilometres (1.2–2.5 mi), corresponding to highly heated rock formations.

== History of Exploration and Development ==
Systematic investigation of Uzbekistan's subsurface geology, including heat flow mapping, has been ongoing for over 45 years by the Institute of Geology and Geophysics (named after Kh.M. Abdullaev).

A major initiative, the Modernizing Uzbekistan's National Innovation System (MUNIS) project, supported by the World Bank, has provided funding for detailed geophysical research to advance renewable geothermal energy. These projects utilize advanced techniques, including gravity, magnetotelluric, and seismic exploration, to create 3D models of potential geothermal fields in the Muruntau and Gissar regions.

== Current and Prospective Utilization ==
Geothermal energy in Uzbekistan is primarily limited to direct use applications, including balneology (therapeutic bathing), heating of residential areas, and industrial agriculture.

=== Balneology and Residential Heating ===
Geothermal water is utilized for health, recreation, and hot water supply in several locations:

Altynsaik Field (Navoi Region): Wells operating at depths of 135–300 metres (443–984 ft) produce low-mineralized water (1.6–1.9 g/l) at temperatures of 68–70 °C (154–158 °F). This water is used for balneotherapy and space heating at the "Altynsai" and "Mother and Child" sanatoriums.

Altyaryk Sanatorium (Fergana): This facility utilizes local geothermal waters at 37–42 °C (99–108 °F) for balneological purposes and as a domestic hot water supply.

Muruntau Project: Plans include utilizing deep heat resources to establish a geothermal station that would provide electricity and heating to a new settlement necessitated by the expansion of the Muruntau gold quarry.

=== Agriculture and Aquaculture ===
Greenhouses: The government has established the "Bukhoro-agro" free economic zone to develop modern greenhouse complexes, which are intended to utilize geothermal resources for heating.

Aquaculture: Thermal waters cooled to 25–30 °C (77–86 °F) are designated for use in intensive fish breeding under the "Uzbekbaliqsanoat" program.

=== Integrated Use Schemes ===
To maximize the economic efficiency of the thermal water resources, a transition from single-purpose use (balneology) to multi-stage integrated utilization (cascading) is proposed. The following schemes illustrate the current and potential rational usage of thermomineral waters, specifically in the context of a sanatorium-dispensary complex:

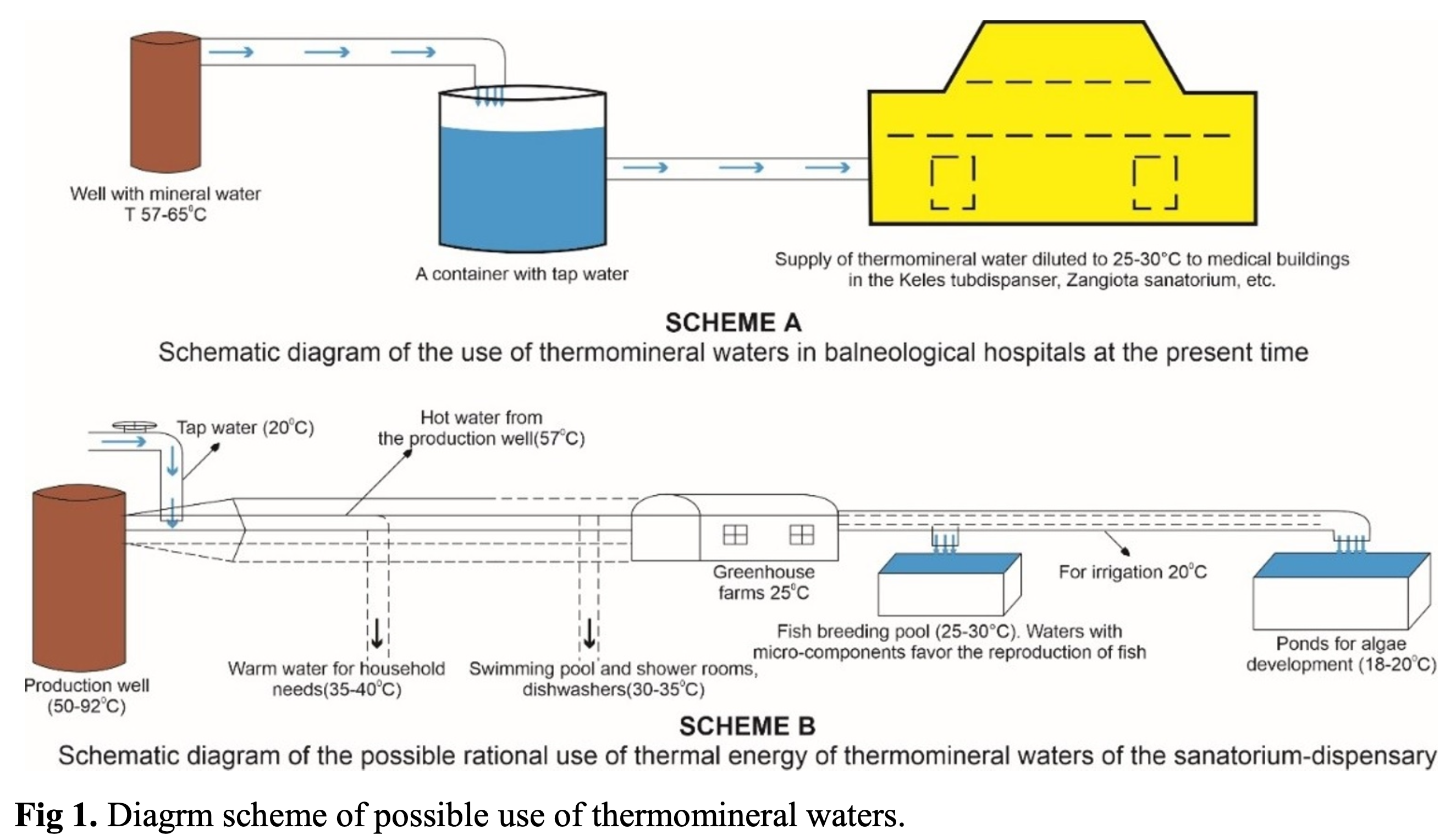
Diagram of the possible use of thermomineral waters

Scheme A (Current Use): Thermomineral water ($57-65^{\circ}C$) is mixed with tap water to dilute it to $25-30^{\circ}C$ before being supplied to medical buildings and sanatoriums for therapeutic bathing (balneology). Specific examples of current applications include the Keles tubdispanser and Zangiota sanatorium.

Scheme B (Proposed Rational Use): This scheme involves a cascade approach to maximize energy use within the complex. Hot water ($50-92^{\circ}C$) is sequentially routed to: Household needs ($35-40^{\circ}C$). Swimming pools and shower rooms ($30-35^{\circ}C$). Greenhouse farms ($25^{\circ}C$). Fish breeding pools ($25-30^{\circ}C$) for aquaculture. Ponds for algae development ($18-20^{\circ}C$). Irrigation ($20^{\circ}C$) at the lowest temperature stage.

== Electricity Generation Prospects ==
While commercial geothermal power plants are not currently operational, feasibility studies for developing such facilities are ongoing.

=== Gulistan Geothermal Station (Gissar Region) ===
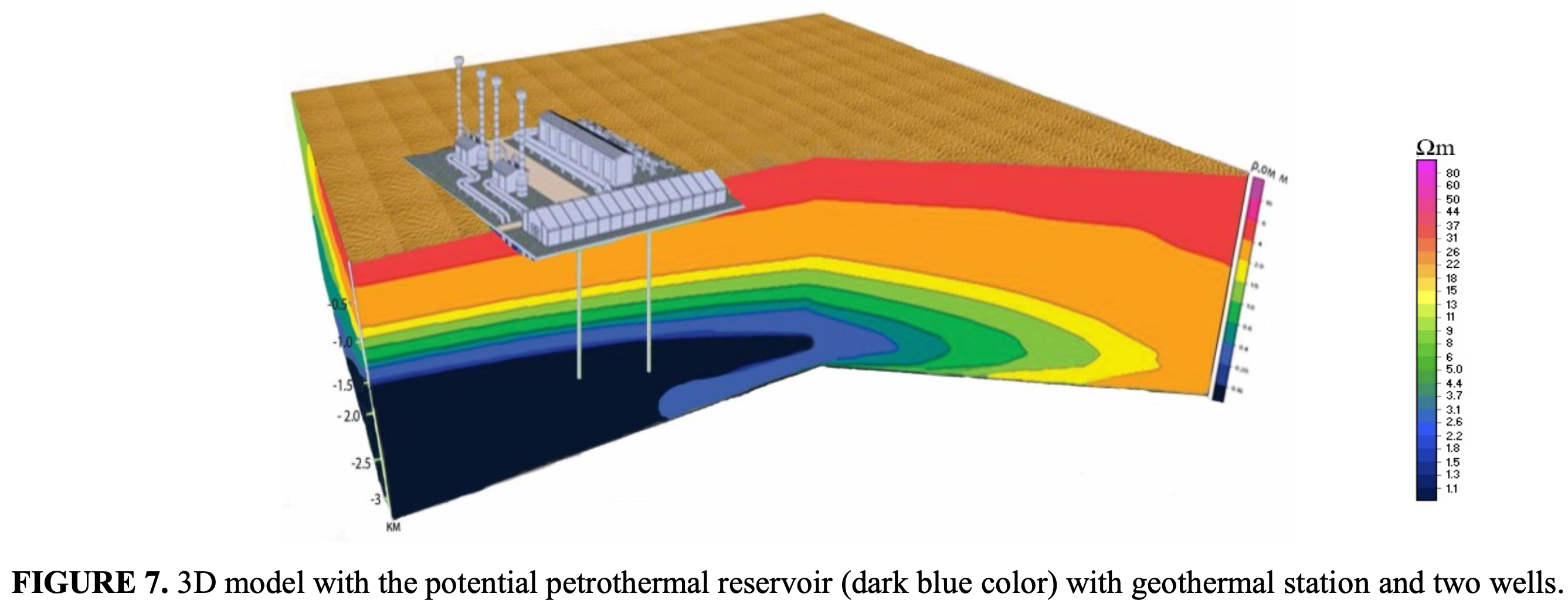
3D model of the Gulistan area showing the potential petrothermal reservoir (dark blue), a proposed geothermal station, and two wells.

The Gulistan Area in the Gissar region is a primary focus for Uzbekistan's first commercial geothermal power plant. Intensive 3D geological modeling has identified potential reservoirs suitable for energy production at depths ranging from 2.5 to 3.5 kilometers (1.6 to 2.2 miles).

The proposed strategy involves the staged construction of binary cycle power plants, a technology well-suited for the identified medium-temperature resources. The ultimate goal is an eventual total installed capacity of 100 megawatts (MW), to be built in 50 MW increments. The use of this technology is crucial to achieving the goal of providing stable baseload power to the national grid.

== Government Policy ==
The Government of Uzbekistan has implemented policies to promote renewable energy and reduce its reliance on fossil fuels and imported energy sources. Key resolutions related to geothermal use include:

PP-3012 (2017): A program outlining measures for the development of renewable energy and improvement of energy efficiency.

PP-2939 (2017): Measures to improve the fish industry management system, specifically integrating geothermal water use into aquaculture.

Cabinet Resolution No. 41 (2022): Focused on establishing the Aral Sea region as a zone for environmental innovation, including the utilization of geothermal waters for health tourism.
