= Wind power in Hungary =

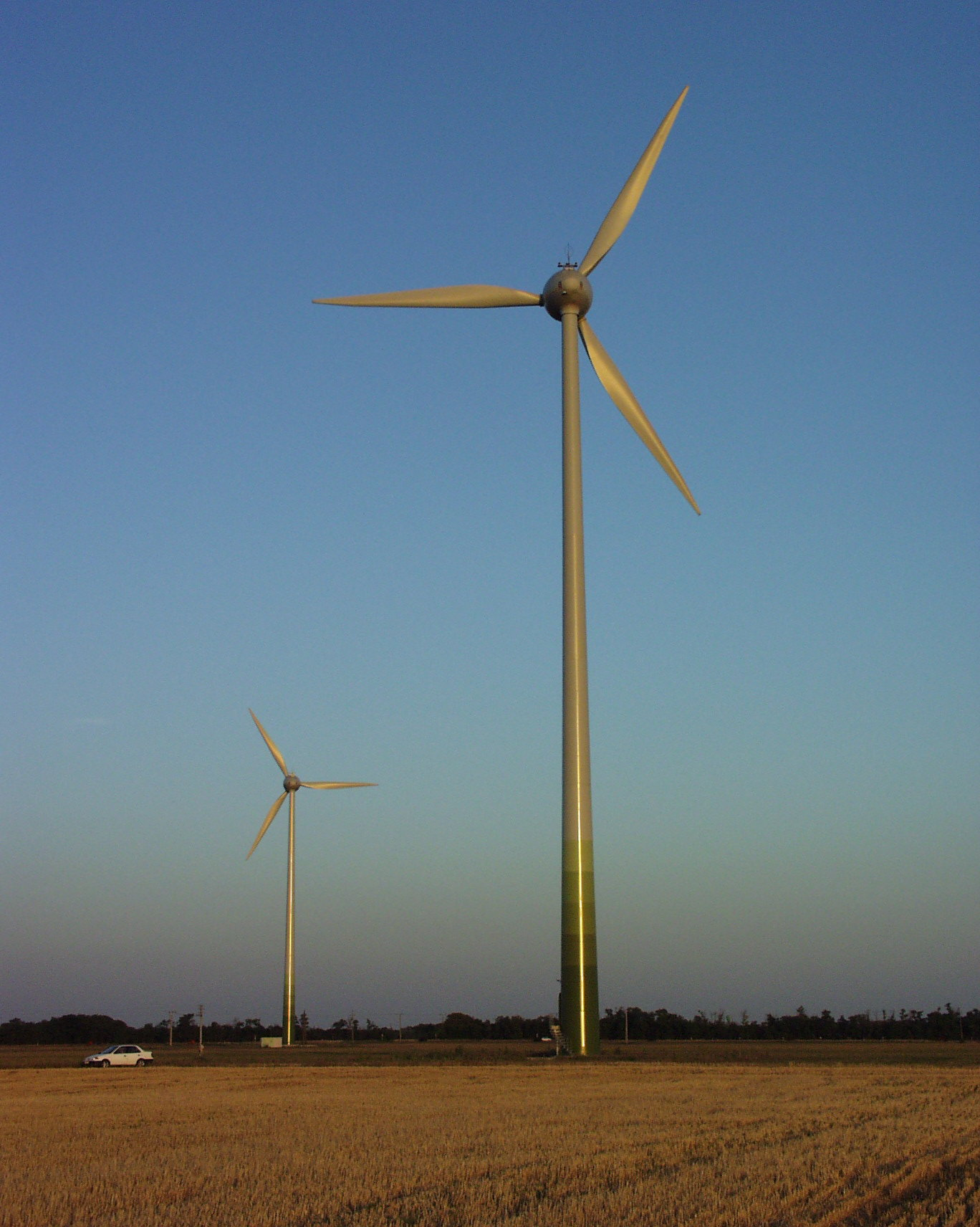
Wind farm near Mosonszolnok

The installed capacity of wind power in Hungary was 329 MW as of April 2011. Most of wind farms are in the Kisalföld region.

As of 1 April 2011, there were 39 operational wind farms in Hungary, with 172 turbines and 329 MW of installed capacity. In 2016 Hungary banned the building of wind turbines within 12km of populated areas, accordingly no new turbines have been constructed since then.

== Installed capacity ==
| Year end | Nameplate capacity (MW_{p}) | Growth | |
| Year end | Nameplate capacity (MW_{p}) | MW_{p} | % of usage |
|---|---|---|---|
| 2002 | 1 | 1 | - |
| 2003 | 2 | 1 | 100% |
| 2004 | 3 | 1 | 50% |
| 2005 | 17 | 14 | 466.7% |
| 2006 | 61 | 44 | 258.9% |
| 2007 | 65 | 4 | 6.6% |
| 2008 | 127 | 62 | 95.4% |
| 2009 | 201 | 74 | 58.3% |
| 2010 | 295 | 94 | 46.8% |
| 2011 | 331 | 36 | 12.2% |
| 2012 | 325 | -6 | -1.8% |
| 2013 | 329 | 4 | 1.2% |
| 2014 | 329 | 0 | - |
| 2015 | 329 | 0 | - |
| 2016 | 329 | 0 | - |
| 2017 | 329 | 0 | - |
IEA-PVPS, WindPower

Cumulative PV capacity in megawatt-peak (MW_{p}) since 2002

== Tenders ==
- The first tender was written in 2006 and it contains 330 MW capacity. Till March 16, 2006 it received 1138 MW capacity.
- In 2009 Hungary tendered for 410 MW of new wind capacity. It received 68 bids totalling 1100 MW capacity, but later the Hungarian Energy Office cancelled it.

== List of wind farms ==
Biggest Wind farms of Hungary.
Red: ≥30MW_{p}; Blue: 30MW-10MW_{p}.

List of the greatest wind farms (≥10MWp)
| No. | Name | MWp | Opened | Number of turbines |
|---|---|---|---|---|
| 1 | Ács Wind Farm (I., II.) | 74 | 2008-2011 | 37 (19+18) |
| 2 | Kisigmánd Wind Farm | 50 | 2009 | 25 |
| 3 | Ikervár Wind Farm (I., II.) | 34 | 2011 | 17 (4+13) |
| 4 | Bőny Wind Farm | 25 | 2009-2010 | 13 |
| 5 | Levél Wind Farm | 24 | 2006-2008 | 12 |
| 6 | Sopronkövesd Wind Farm | 23 | 2008 | 8 |
| 7 | Mosonmagyaróvár Wind Farm (I.-VIII.) | 21.2 | 2003-2008 | 12 |
| 8 | Bábolna Wind Farm | 15 | 2010 | 7 (6+1) |
| 9 | Jánossomorja Wind Farm | 10 | 2010 | |
| | Mosonszolnok Wind Farm (I., II.) | 6 | 2002-2007 | 4 |

=== Biggest owners ===
- MVM Group:

More than 5 MWp: Felsőzsolca, Paks, Pécs, Visonta
Less than 5 MWp:

- MET Power: Százhalombatta
- Solar Markt: Csepreg, Kőszeg, Söjtör, Vép
- ALTEO Group: Balatonberény (7 MWp), Nagykőrös (7 MWp), Monor (4 MWp)

EU and Hungary Wind Energy Capacity (MW)
| No | Country | 2012 | 2011 | 2010 | 2009 | 2008 | 2007 | 2006 | 2005 | 2004 | 2003 | 2002 | 2001 | 2000 | 1999 | 1998 |
|---|---|---|---|---|---|---|---|---|---|---|---|---|---|---|---|---|
| - | EU-27 | 105,696 | 93,957 | 84,074 | 74,767 | 64,712 | 56,517 | 48,069 | 40,511 | 34,383 | 28,599 | 23,159 | 17,315 | 12,887 | 9,678 | 6,453 |
| 17 | Hungary | 329 | 329 | 295 | 201 | 127 | 65 | 61 | 17 | 3 | 3 | 3 | 0 | 0 | 0 | 0 |

== See also ==
- Renewable energy in Hungary
- Energy in Hungary
- List of renewable energy topics by country
- Wind power in the European Union
- European Wind Energy Association
- Global Wind Energy Council
