= Solar power in Somalia =

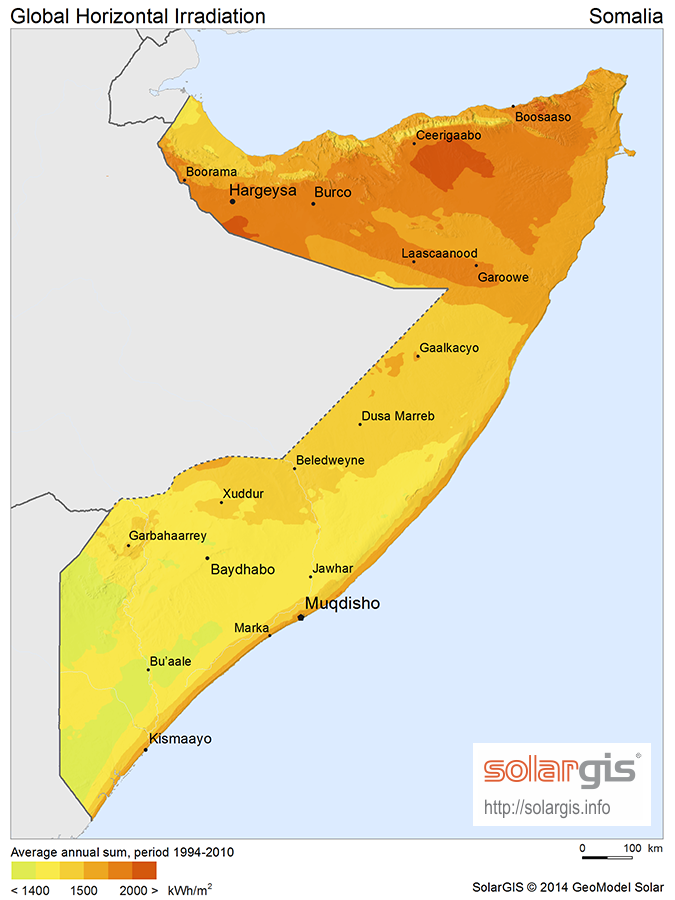
Solar potential

Solar power in Somalia is a growing source of electricity, driven largely by private sector investment and the country's high solar potential.

== Potential ==
Somalia has one of the highest solar energy potentials in the world, owing to its geographic location near the equator and consistently high levels of solar irradiation. Average solar radiation across the country ranges between 5 and 7 kWh/m² per day, with over 3,000 hours of sunshine annually, making it highly suitable for solar power generation.

Studies indicate that solar radiation is widely distributed across the country, with relatively small regional variation, meaning that most areas of Somalia are suitable for solar energy development. Somalia has one of the highest combined wind and solar energy potentials on the planet.

The country's strong solar resource, combined with limited grid infrastructure, makes solar energy particularly suitable for decentralized applications such as off-grid systems and mini-grids. Estimates from the World Bank in 2018 suggest significant demand for solar home systems, with potential reaching over one million units, indicating substantial room for expansion in both rural and urban areas.

== Utilization ==
Despite this high potential, solar energy remains underutilized due to constraints such as high upfront costs, limited infrastructure, and lack of technical capacity, although falling technology costs and increasing private sector investment are expected to drive future growth.

Since 1991, Somalia's renewable energy sector has developed largely through private initiatives. In Somaliland, a 5 MW solar plant was commissioned in the city of Berbera in 2026. In Puntland, Somalia's first hybrid solar-wind plant began operating in 2016 in the city of Garowe. The largest solar power plant in Somalia was built by the private company BECO in Mogadishu in 2020, with a capacity of 10 MW, supplying electricity to the city. BECO has also announced plans to expand the plant's capacity to 100 MW. In addition, several other companies in Mogadishu provide off-grid solar energy solutions, including Blue Sky, Solargen, Delta, and others.

As of 2025, of the country's 400 MW (Note: Somalia's electricity sector is highly decentralized, with most generation provided through privately owned off-grid diesel mini-grids rather than a national grid, meaning installed capacity figures do not represent a unified system.) installed capacity, about 100 MW came from solar and wind power. Only about 10% of the electricity used in Somalia comes from renewable sources.

== See also ==
- Economy of Somalia
- Deployment of solar power to energy grids
- List of renewable energy topics by country
