= Energy in Cape Verde =

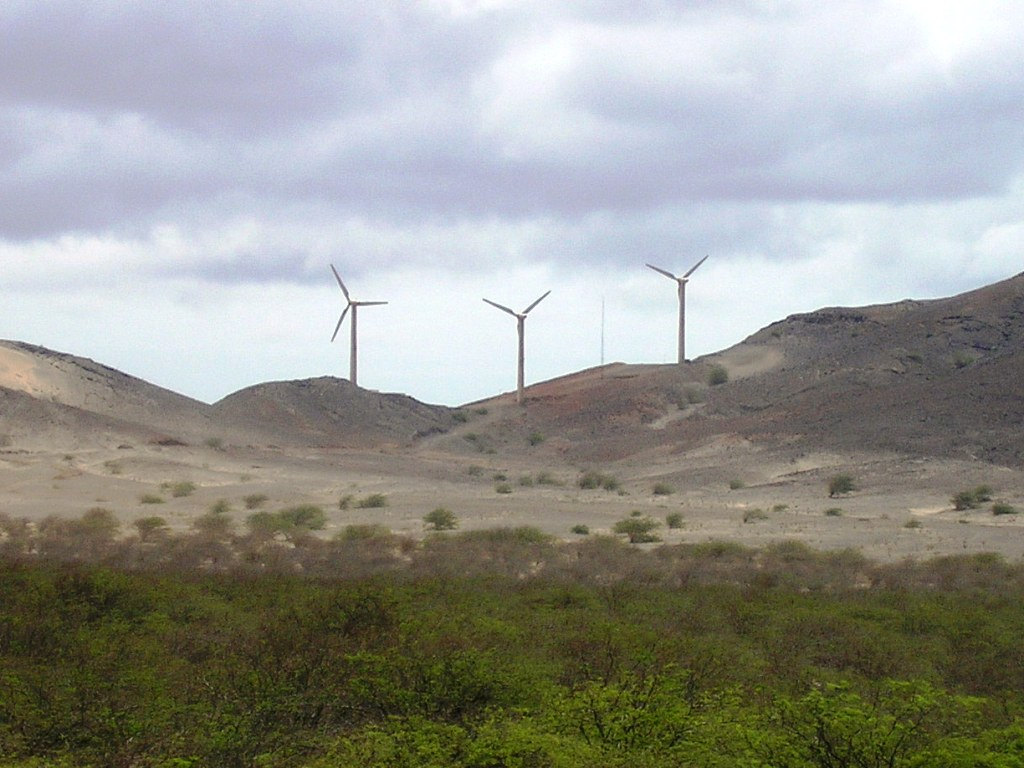
Wind farm on São Vicente island, Cape Verde

Cape Verde is a net importer of energy, with no significant fossil energy resources. As of 2016, 176,743 tonnes of fuel (about 3,550 barrels per day) were sold on the internal market. Electricity production was 443 GWh in 2016, of which 81% from thermal power, 17% from wind power and 1.4% from solar power. The main electricity producing company of Cape Verde is Electra. Electra serves all islands of Cape Verde except Boa Vista, where electricity and water are produced and distributed by the public-private company Águas e Energia de Boavista. Other smaller electricity producers are Cabeólica, which operates four wind parks, Águas de Ponta Preta on the island of Sal, and Electric Wind on Santo Antão.

== Renewable energy ==
Cape Verde aims to get 50% of its electricity from renewable energy resources by 2030 and 100% by 2050. This coincides with aims to bring down energy import costs and help the environment by reducing greenhouse gas emissions. The country has integrated wind and solar in its energy system. It also has the potential to utilize emerging technologies as ocean thermal energy conversion. A 26 MWh grid battery started at a wind farm in 2025.
