= Renewable energy in Bangladesh =

Solar panel in a cage

Renewable energy in Bangladesh refers to the use of renewable energy to generate electricity in Bangladesh. Currently, renewable energy comes from biogas that is originated from biomass, hydro power, solar and wind. According to National database of Renewable Energy total renewable energy capacity installed in Bangladesh 1374.68 MW.

In 2021, the World Bank described Bangladesh's off-grid solar power program as the world's largest. The program had provided electricity access to 20 million people.

== Hydro energy ==
Karnafuli Hydroelectric Power Station is the largest producer of renewable hydroelectricity in Bangladesh. Inaugurated in 1962, it provides 58.97% of renewable energy share as of 2021.

== Solar power ==
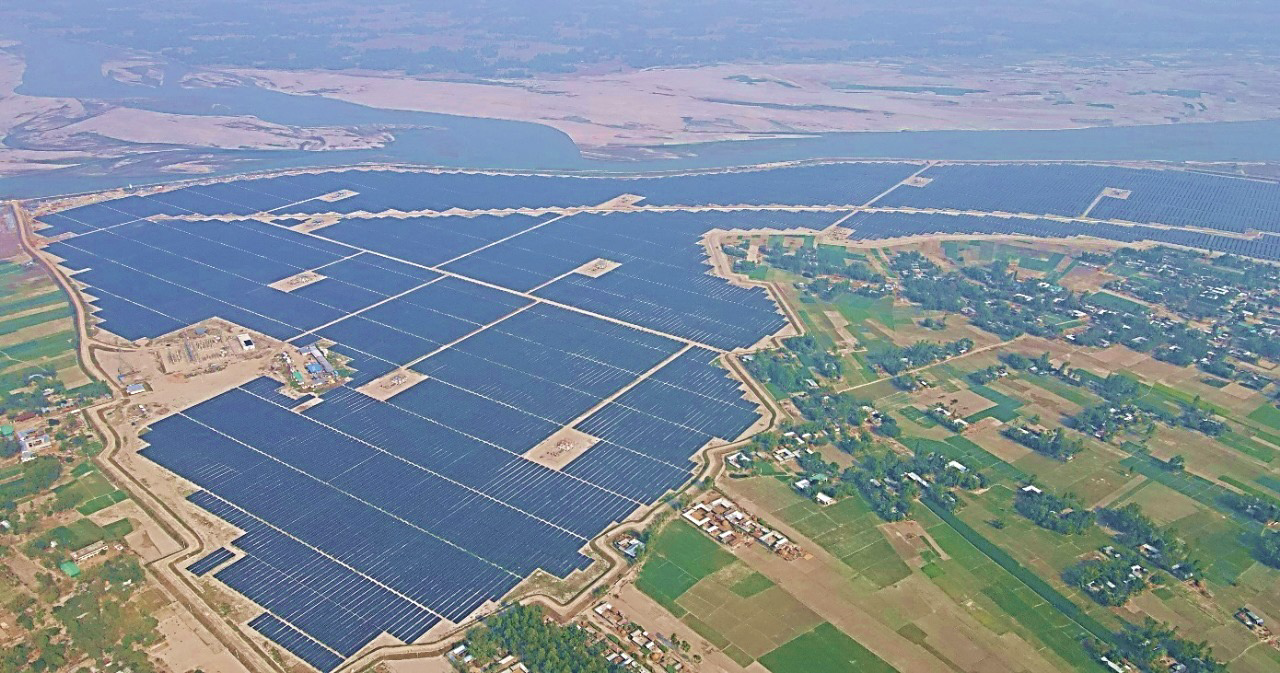
Teesta Solar Park, the country's largest solar power plant

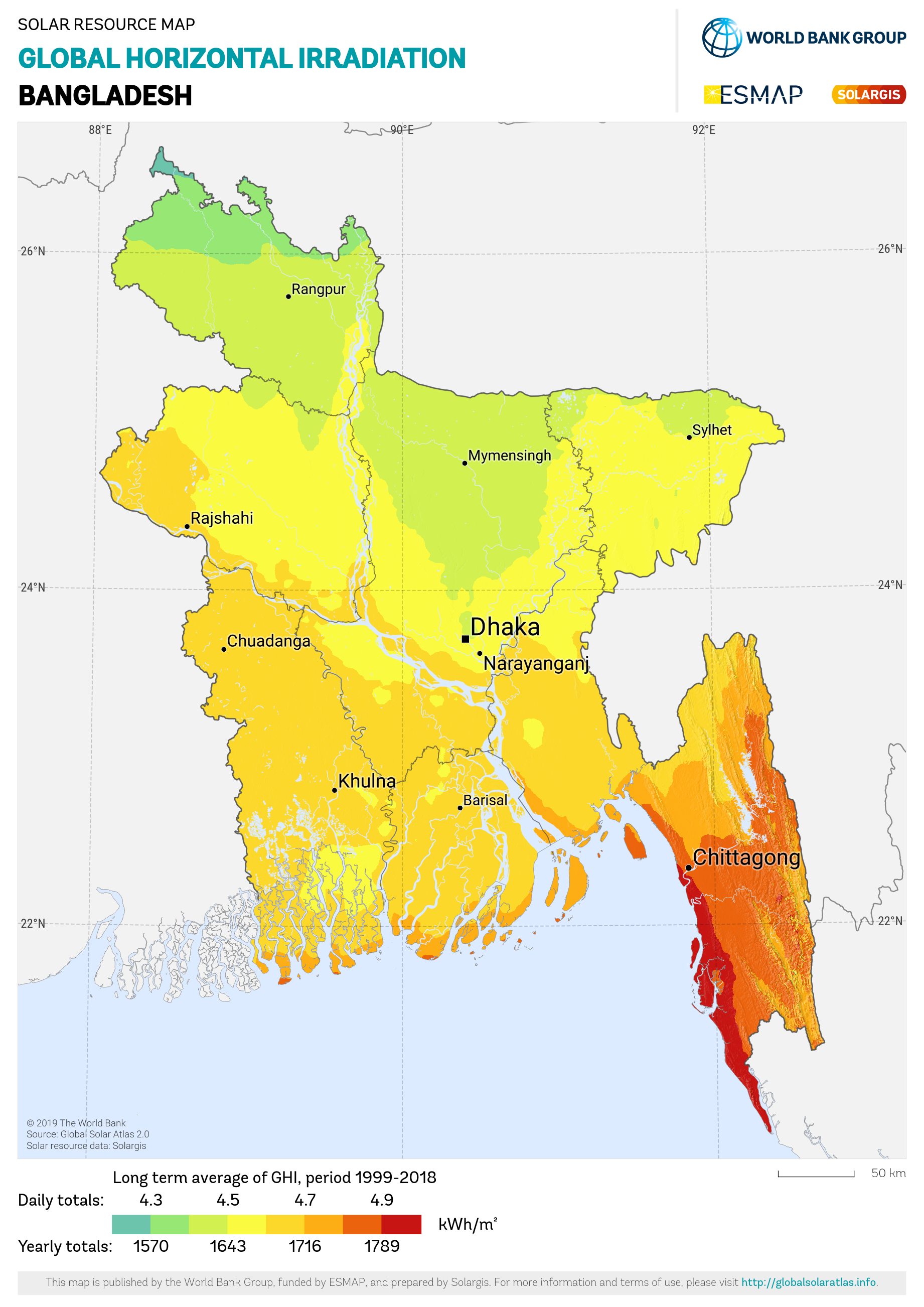
Solar potential of Bangladesh

As of 2024, 459 megawatts are generated from 10 solar power plants in Bangladesh. The largest is the Teesta 200MW Solar Park in Gaibandha, launched in 2023. Bangladesh entered its renewable energy era in 2017 with the launch of a 3MW solar power plant in Sharishabari, Jamalpur.

The long term average sunshine data indicates that the period of bright sunshine hours in the coastal regions of Bangladesh varies from 3 to 11 hours daily. The insolation in Bangladesh varies from 3.8 kWh/m^{2}/day to 6.4 kWh/m^{2}/day at an average of 5 kWh/m^{2}/day. Studies have shown that Bangladesh has a solar power potential of 50,174 megawatts, which could meet approximately 80% of the country's projected 2041 energy demand of 60,000 megawatts. These indicate that there are good prospects for solar thermal and photovoltaic application in the country.

With an estimated 40% of the population in Bangladesh having no access to electricity, the government introduced a scheme known as solar home systems (SHS) to provide electricity to households with no grid access. The program reached 3 million households as of late 2014 and, with more than 50,000 systems being added per month since 2009, the World Bank has called it "the fastest growing solar home system program in the world."

The Bangladeshi government is working towards universal electricity access by 2021 with the SHS program projected to cover 6 million households by 2017.

Clean energy accessibility extended to the 8.2 million inhabitants residing in rural regions of Bangladesh, ensuring universal electricity access across all households.

Solar energy capacity 2014–2023 (MW)
2014	2015	2016	2017	2018	2019	2020	2021	2022	2023
169	196	165	217	240	280	343	506	524	767

== Wind power ==
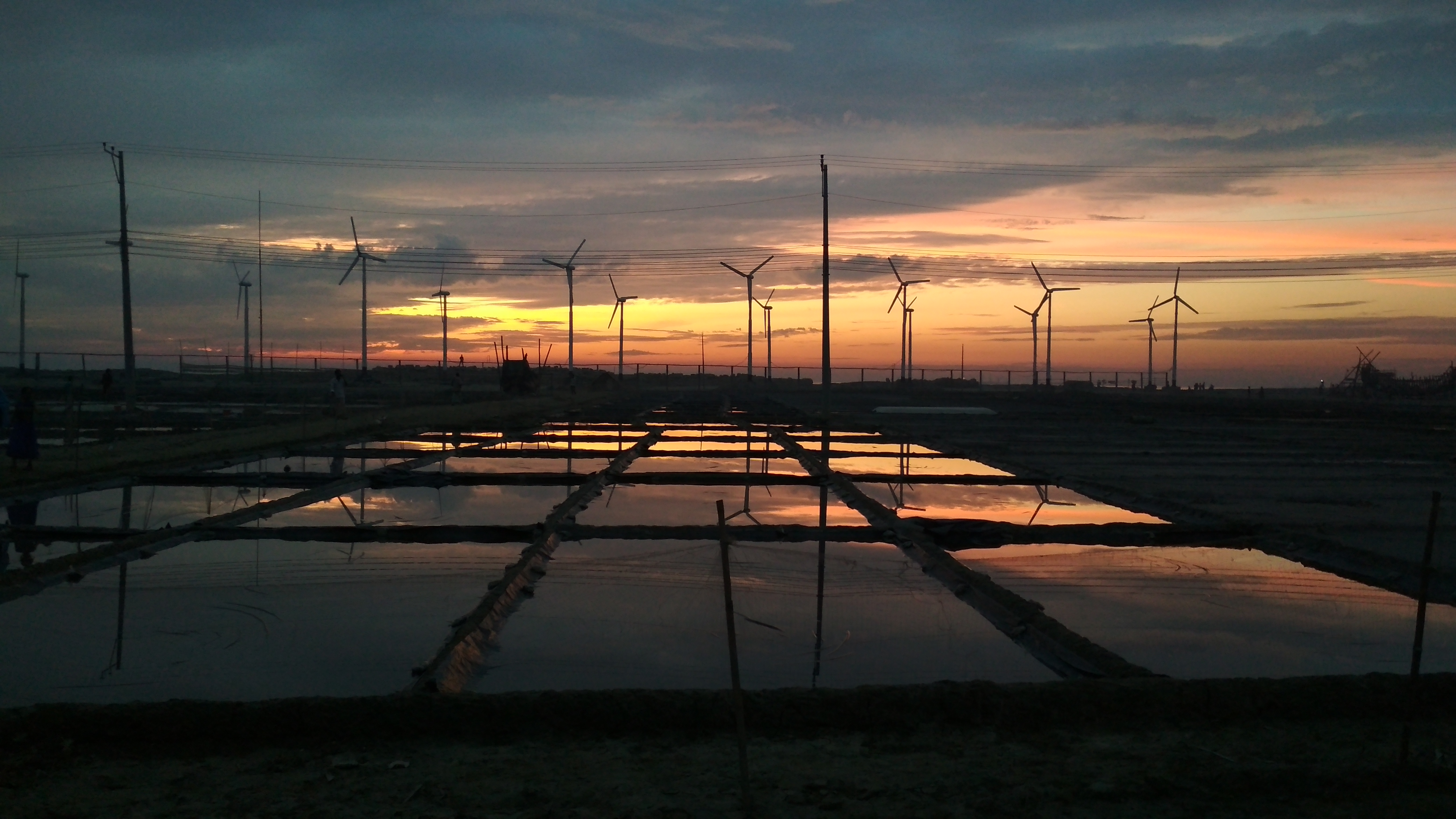
Kutubdia windmill

The first commercial wind power plant in Bangladesh, boasting a capacity of 60 megawatts with 22 turbines, began full-scale operation on 8 March 2024 in Cox's Bazar. However, the country's first experimental wind power plant, a 0.9MW facility, was constructed by the Bangladesh Power Development Board near the dam along the Muhuri River in Feni in 2005. Three years later, a 1MW wind power plant was established in Kutubdia, Cox's Bazar. Both experimental plants are now out of operation due to a lack of supervision and interest from the board.

The long term wind flow, especially in the islands and the southern coastal belt of Bangladesh indicate that the average wind speed remains between 3 and 4.5 m/s for the months of March to September and 1.7 to 2.3 for the remaining period of the year. There is a good opportunity in island and coastal areas for the application of wind mills for pumping and electrification. But during the summer and monsoon seasons (March to October) there can be very low-pressure areas and storm wind speeds 200 to 300 km/h can be expected. Wind turbines have to be strong enough to withstand these high wind speeds.

Total renewable energy capacity 2014–2023 (MW)
2014	2015	2016	2017	2018	2019	2020	2021	2022	2023
405	434	403	455	478	518	582	744	762	1,006

== Tidal power ==
Renewable electricity generation by source (non-combustible), 2021
1. Hydro (59.0%)
2. Solar PV (40.5%)
3. Wind (0.51%)

The tides at Chittagong Division are predominantly semidiurnal with a large variation in range corresponding to the seasons, the maximum occurring during the south-west monsoon. In 1984, an attempt was made by mechanical engineering department of KUET to assess the feasibility of tidal energy in the coastal regions of Bangladesh, especially at Cox's Bazar and at the islands of Maheshkhali and Kutubdia. The average tidal range was found within 4-5 meter and the amplitude of the spring tide exceeds even 6 meter. From different calculations, it is anticipated that there are a number of suitable sites at Cox's Bazar, Maheshkhali, Kutubdia and other places where permanent basins with pumping arrangements might be constructed which would be a double operation scheme.

== Waste to electric energy ==
In order to save the large cities from environmental pollution, the waste management as well as electricity generation from the solid wastes programme is being taken by the government.

== Biogas ==
There mainly two types of biogas plants used in Bangladesh, floating dome type and fixed dome type. Bag type plants are also used in the country but rarely.

== Geothermal energy ==
Geothermal potential of Bangladesh is yet to be determined. Different studies carried out by geologists have suggested possible geothermal resources in the northwest and southeast region. Among the studied areas of northwest region, Singra-Kuchma-Bogra area, Barapukuria coal basin area, and the Madhyapara hard rock mine area − with temperature gradient above 30 °C/km and bottom hole temperature in excess of 100 °C− meet the requirements of binary cycle power plants. But to reach a foregone conclusion on exploiting the resource in a viable, feasible and economically profitable way, extensive research is required. In 2011, Anglo MGH Energy, a Dhaka-based private company announced the construction of 200 MW geothermal plant, first ever of such kind, in Thakurgaon district. But for some unknown reasons, this project never commenced, and no development in this field has been announced afterwards.

== The benefits of renewable energy in Bangladesh ==
Expanding capacity in the electricity sector can be achieved cost-effectively through clean energy options (renewables and energy efficiency), which not only reduce greenhouse gas emissions, but also increase jobs and improve human health by reducing air pollution. According to a report from the Low Emission Development Strategies Global Partnership (LEDS GP) and based on detailed modelling analysis, the benefits of increasing clean energy in Bangladesh's power generation mix relative to ‘business-as-usual’ could generate the following cumulative results by 2030:

- reduce greenhouse gas emissions by up to 20%
- generate domestic employment of up to 55,000 full-time equivalent jobs
- Potential to produce additional electricity of 30 GW from the utilisation of solar PV and 53 gigawatt (GW) of electricity potential from all solar sources.
- save up to 27,000 lives, and over US$5 billion (BDT 420 billion).

As of June 2023, renewable energy constitutes 4.5 percent of the total installed power capacity in Bangladesh, with 1,183 MW out of 22,215 MW coming from renewable sources, predominantly solar power.

== See also ==
- Climate change in Bangladesh
- Electricity sector in Bangladesh
- Renewable energy policy of Bangladesh
