= Electricity sector in Colombia =

Electricity sector of Colombia
Data
- Electricity coverage (2015): 96.96% (total), 99.72% (urban), 87.83% (rural); (LAC total average in 2014: 97%)
- Installed capacity (2015): 15.5 GW
- Share of fossil energy: 33%
- Share of renewable energy: 64% (mostly large hydro)
- GHG emissions from electricity generation (2003): 6.5 Mt CO_{2}
- Average electricity use (2005): 828 kWh per capita
- Distribution losses (2014): 11%; (LAC average in 2014: 16%)

Consumption by sector (% of total)
- Residential: 42.2%
- Industrial: 31.8%

Tariffs and financing
- Average residential tariff (US$/kW·h, 2006): 0.0979; (LAC average in 2005: 0.115)
- Average industrial tariff (US$/kW·h, 2006): 0.0975 (LAC average in 2005: 0.107)

Services
- Sector unbundling: Yes
- Share of private sector in generation: 60%
- Competitive supply to large users: Yes
- Competitive supply to residential users: Yes (only above 0.5 MW)

Institutions
- No. of service providers: 66 (generation), 7 (transmission), 61 (distribution)
- Responsibility for transmission: Transelec
- Responsibility for regulation: CREG
- Responsibility for policy-setting: Ministry of Mines and Energy
- Responsibility for the environment: Ministry of the Environment, Housing and Regional Development
- Electricity sector law: Yes (1994)
- Renewable energy law: No
- CDM transactions related to the electricity sector: 3 registered CDM projects; 107,465 t CO_{2}e annual emissions reductions

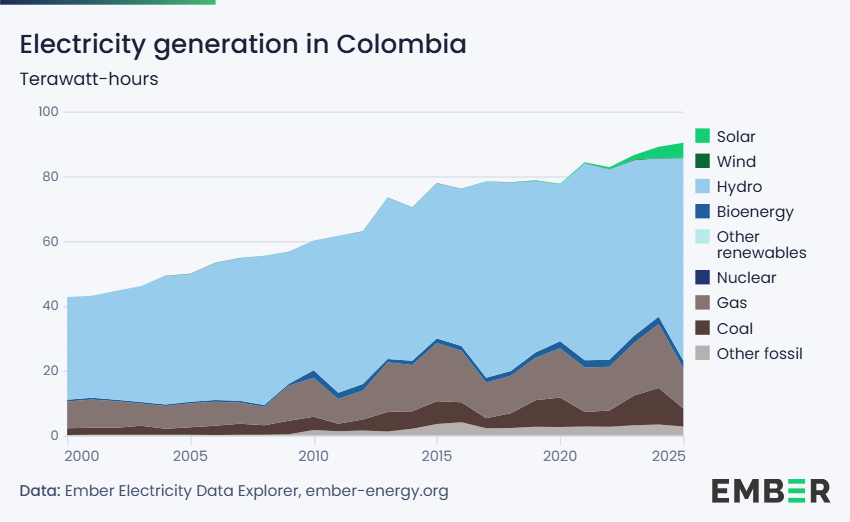
Electricity generation in Colombia in terawatt-hours

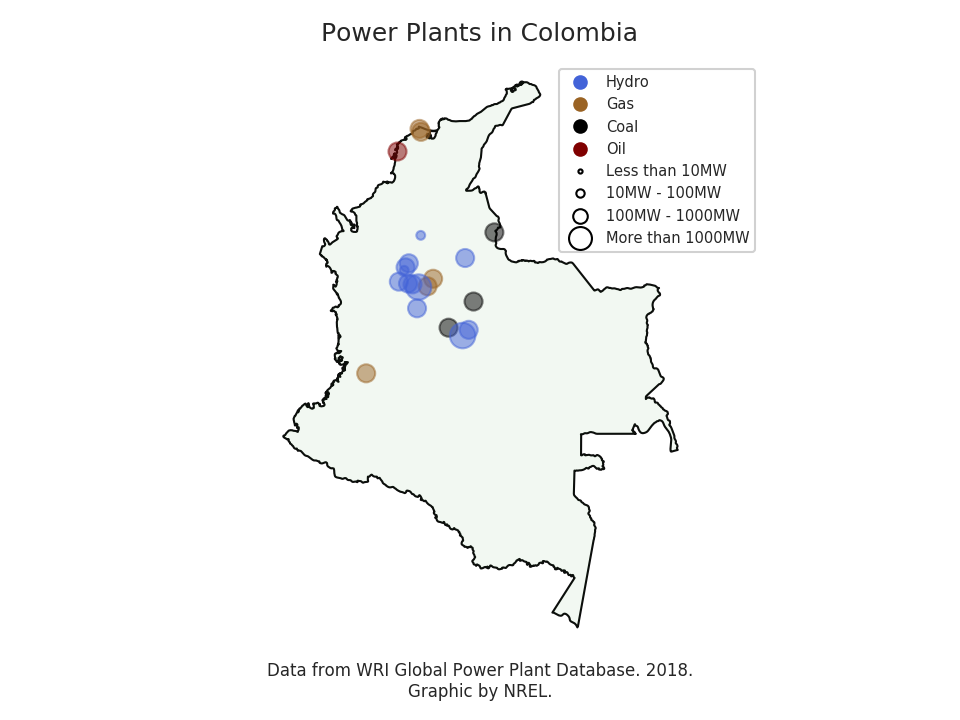
Power plants in Colombia

The electricity sector in Colombia is dominated by large hydropower generation (65%) and thermal generation (35%). Despite the country's large potential for new renewable energy technologies (mainly wind, solar, and biomass), this potential has been barely tapped. A 2001 law designed to promote alternative energies lacks certain key provisions to achieve this objective, such as feed-in tariffs, and has had little impact so far. Large hydropower and thermal plants dominate the current expansion plans. The construction of a transmission line with Panama, which will link Colombia with Central America, is underway.

An interesting characteristic of the Colombian electricity sector (as well as of its water sector) is a system of cross-subsidies from users living in areas considered relatively affluent and from users consuming higher amounts of electricity to those living in areas considered poor and to those who use less electricity.

The electricity sector has been unbundled into generation, transmission, distribution, and commercialization since sector reforms were carried out in 1994. About half the generation capacity is privately owned. Private participation in electricity distribution is much lower.

== Electricity supply and demand ==
=== Supply ===
==== Installed capacity ====
Electricity supply in Colombia relies on the National Interconnected System (SIN) and several isolated local systems in the Non-Interconnected Zones (ZNI). SIN encompasses one third of the territory, giving coverage to 96 percent of the population. The ZNI, which covers the remaining two thirds of the national territory, only serves 4 percent of the population.

Thirty-two large hydroelectric plants and thirty thermal power stations feed electricity into the SIN. On the other hand, the ZNI is mostly served by small diesel generators, many of which are not in good working condition. At June 2015, installed net effective capacity was 15.5 Gigawatt (GW), with the following share by source:

TECHNOLOGY	INSTALLED CAPACITY (MW)	PERCENTAGE
Hydroelectric	10,919.8	70.35%
Thermal (gas)	1,684.4	10.85%
Thermal (coal)	1,180	7.60%
Liquid	1,366	8.80%
Gas - Liquid	276	1.78%
Biomass	77.2	0.50%
Wind	18.4	0.12%
TOTAL	15,521.8 MW	100%

The share of thermal participation in generation has increased since the mid-1990s. This has happened in response to the 1992/1993 crisis caused by El Niño-Southern Oscillation associated droughts and the high reliance of power generation on hydroelectric installations that lacked multi-year storage capacity. As a result of the new policies adopted by the country, the dominance of hydropower in the generation portfolio has been reduced from 80 percent in the early 1990s to less than 65 percent today. The expansion path involved adding 1,500 MW of new capacity, equally distributed between hydro and thermal sources, by 2011. This will entail investments of US$258 million per year.

==== Production ====
Total electricity production in 2005 was 50.4 Terawatt-hour (TWh). Hydroelectric plants generated 81.2 percent, thermal plants 18.6 percent and the Jepírachi wind plant 0.1 percent of the total.

=== Demand ===
In 2005, total electricity consumption was 48.8 TWh, which corresponds to an average energy consumption per capita of 828 kW·h per year. Consumption per sector is divided as follows:

- Residential: 42.2%
- Industrial: 31.8%
- Commercial: 18%
- Official: 3.8%
- Other uses: 4.3%

Demand is growing by approximately 4 percent annually.

=== Imports and exports ===
Colombia is a net power exporter. In 2005 the country exported 1.76 TWh of electricity to Ecuador (3.5% of total production). It imported only very small volumes of electricity from Venezuela and Ecuador (0.02 TWh each). According to the Ministry of Mines and Energy, exports are estimated to increase at 5 percent annually.

The Puebla Panama Plan includes a project of electric interconnection between Colombia and Panama that will allow the integration of Colombia with Central America. This project, carried out by Interconexión Eléctrica S.A. (ISA) in Colombia and Empresa de Transmisión Eléctrica S.A. (ETESA) in Panama, entails the construction of a transmission line with 300 MW capacity (3% of installed capacity) from Colombia to Panama and 200 MW capacity in the reverse way. The line is expected to become operational in 2010.

== Access to electricity ==
In 2005 , the interconnected electricity system served 87 percent of the population, a percentage that is below the 95 percent average for Latin America and the Caribbean. In Colombia, electricity coverage is 93 percent in urban areas and 55 percent in rural areas. About 2.3 million people do not have access to electricity yet.

As in other countries, the zones outside the interconnected system pose especially challenging conditions for electrification, as well major inadequacies in service provision. This system, whose installed capacity is almost exclusively diesel-based, suffers from major diseconomies of scale as 80 percent of capacity is in plants below the 100 kW threshold.

== Service quality ==
=== Interruption frequency and duration ===
Service quality in Colombia, as measured by service interruptions, is much lower than the average for Latin America and the Caribbean. In 2005, the average number of interruptions per subscriber was 185.7, far above the regional average of 13 interruptions. The duration of interruptions per subscriber was 66 hours, also far above the regional average of 14 hours.

=== Distribution and transmission losses ===
Losses in transmission and leaks are still a concern, even if the total amount has decreased in the last years. Distribution losses in 2005 were 16 percent, compared to 13.6% average in Latin America and the Caribbean (LAC).

== Responsibilities ==
=== Policy and regulation ===
Colombia has had a liberalized energy market since 1995. The sector is characterized by an unbundled generation, transmission, distribution, and commercialization framework.

The structure of the Colombian energy market is based on Laws 142 (Public Services Law) and 143 (Electricity Law) of 1994. The Ministry of Mines and Energy is the leading institution in Colombia's energy sector. Within the Ministry, the Unit for Mining and Energy Planning (UPME) is responsible for the study of future energy requirements and supply situations, as well as for drawing up the National Energy Plan and Expansion Plan.

The Regulatory Commission for Gas and Energy (CREG) is in charge of regulating the market for the efficient supply of energy. It defines tariff structures for consumers and guarantees free network access, transmission charges, and standards for the wholesale market, guaranteeing the quality and reliability of the service and economic efficiency. Among others, CREG is responsible for providing regulations that ensure the rights of consumers, the inclusion of environmental and socially sustainable principles, improved coverage, and financial sustainability for participating entities.

The provision of public services (water, electricity, and telecommunications) to final users is supervised by the independent Superintendency for Residential Public Services, or SSPD.

=== Generation ===
Colombia has 66 registered electricity producers. Private companies own 60 percent of the installed generation capacity and account for 43 percent (measured in number of consumers) to 49 percent (measured in kWh sales) of energy supplied to the interconnected grid.

Just three companies - the public companies Empresas Públicas de Medellín (EPM) and ISAGEN, as well as the private EMGESA - control altogether 52 percent of total generation capacity.

=== Transmission ===
Transmission in the National Interconnected System is carried out by seven different public companies, four of which work exclusively in transmission (ISA, EEB, TRANSELCA and DISTASA). The remaining three (EEPPM, ESSA and EPSA) are integrated companies that carry out all the activities in the electricity chain (i.e. generation, transmission and distribution). The largest company is Interconexión Eléctrica S.A. (ISA), which belongs to the government.

=== Distribution and commercialization ===
Currently, there are 28 pure commercializing companies; 22 distribution and commercialization ones; 8 ones that integrate generation, distribution and commercialization; and 3 fully integrated ones. The three largest players in commercialization are Unión Fenosa (with Electrocosta and Electrocaribe), Endesa (in Bogotá) and Empresas Públicas de Medellín (EPM).

== Renewable energy resources ==
Colombia has 28.1 MW installed capacity of renewable energy (excluding large hydro), consisting mainly of wind power. The country has significant small hydro, wind, and solar resources that remain largely unexploited. According to a study by the World Bank's Energy Sector Management Assistance Program (ESMAP), exploitation of the country's significant wind potential alone could cover more than the country's current total energy needs.

== History ==
=== Early history ===
The first historical landmark in the establishment of electric supply dates back from 1928, when Law 113 declared the exploitation of hydroelectric power of public interest. The system worked in a centralized manner, in which vertically integrated state companies maintained a monopoly in their corresponding regions. A public company, ISA, exchanged electricity among the different regional systems.

During the 1980s, the sector suffered a crisis, similar to most countries in Latin America. The crisis was the result of subsidized tariffs, political influence in the state companies, and the delays and cost overruns of large generation projects.

=== 1994 reforms ===
At the beginning of the 1990s the government took steps to modernize the electricity sector, opening it to private participation. The restructuring was carried out through Laws 142 (Law of Public Services) and 143 (Electricity Law) of 1994, which defined the regulatory framework for the development of a competitive market. The new scheme, designed by the CREG, was implemented from July 1995 onwards.

=== Law 697 of 2001 ===
Colombia has an ambitious reform agenda in the power sector. The country seeks to encourage foreign investment, with an emphasis on hydrocarbons and power capacity expansion; simplify modalities for small-scale energy projects; and renew interest in non-conventional renewable energy technologies with a regulatory framework to facilitate a gradual change in the energy mix.

In 2001, Law 697, which promotes the efficient and rational use of energy and alternative energies, was promulgated. This law was regulated by Decree 3683, issued in 2003. The law and the decree contemplate important aspects such as the stimulus to education and research in renewable energy sources (RES). Nevertheless, the program created under this law lacks fundamental aspects to impulse the development of RES significantly, such as a regulatory support system to encourage investment, the definition of policies to promote renewable energy, or quantitative targets for the share of renewable energy.

Limitations such as the ones above present an important legal vacuum for renewable energy in Colombia. While there have been a few initiatives concerning efficient and rational use of energy (design of the Colombian program of normalization, accreditation, certification and labeling of final use of energy equipment, and promotion of carburant mixture for vehicle use and massive use of natural gas), there have been no recent initiatives related to new renewable energy technologies.

== Tariffs and subsidies ==
=== Tariffs ===
The electricity market in Colombia has regulated and non-regulated segments. The regulated market, which is directly contracted and supplied by distribution companies, applies to industrial, commercial, and residential users with power demands under 0.5MW. In this market, the tariff structure is established by the regulatory agency CREG. In the non-regulated market, consumers with power demands of 0.5 MW and above can negotiate freely and contract their supply in the wholesale market (i.e., spot and contracts markets) directly or through commercial entities, distributors, or producers.

In 2005, the average residential tariff was US$0.0979 per kWh, slightly below the LAC weighted average of US$0.115. The average industrial tariff was US$0.0975 per kWh, slightly below the LAC weighted average of US$0.107.

=== Subsidies and cross-subsidies ===
By law all urban areas in Colombia are classified in one of six socio-economic strata, which are used to determine the level of tariffs for electricity, water and other services. According to that system, consumers living in areas considered as poor - and consumers using low amounts of electricity - receive electricity and natural gas at subsidized tariffs. These cross-subsidies are almost entirely (approximately 98 percent) financed by consumers living in areas considered as being relatively affluent and who use more electricity. The cross-subsidies cover about 25 percent of the electricity and gas bill of low-income consumers. A special fund that covers the remaining amount not covered by consumers provided US$21.8 million in 2005. On average, 7.5 million people a month benefited from this fund. In addition, the fund provided subsidies of COP$ 17,159 million (US$7.4 million) to 1,808,061 natural gas users.

Subsidies are also given to provide diesel for power production in non-grid-connected zones. While diesel in the interior of the country can cost in the order of US$0.8/gal, in remote areas it can cost in the order of US$4.5/gal because of high transport costs.

The subsidy stratification system in Colombia has proven fairly ineffective at channeling subsidies towards the poor. Although the scheme is broad in its coverage and excludes no more than 2 percent of the poor for services with broad coverage such as electricity, water and sanitation, there are also high leakage rates. Some 50-60 percent of subsidy beneficiaries are from the top half of the income distribution and, moreover, only 30-35 percent of subsidy resources are captured by the poor. Nevertheless, the performance of this subsidy scheme varies depending on the service considered, being water the sector with the poorest performance and telephony the one with the best behavior.

== Investment and financing ==
=== Investment ===
A 2004 report by the World Bank estimated the following power sector investment needs for Colombia up to 2010:

	2005	2006	2007	2008	2009	2010	Total	Average annual
Maintenance	310	310	310	310	310	310	1,860	310
Rehabilitation	43	43	43	43	43	43	258	43
PPAs ^{(1)}	113	113	113	113	113	113	678	113
Generation	82	331	388	306	248	190	1,545	258
Transmission	86	85	85	0	0	0	256	43
Total	634	882	939	772	714	656	4,597	767

^{(1)} Power Purchase Agreement

In summary, the overall investment needs in the electricity generation, transmission and distribution sector total US$767 million per year. About 60 percent of that relates to maintenance obligations and payment of Power Purchase Agreement (PPA) guarantees, and the remaining 40 percent to new investment in generation and transmission. These investment needs are completely related to the SIN and do not take into account the needs associated with the ZNI.

=== Financing of rural electrification ===
There are three different funds and programs that support rural electrification in Colombia, each established at a different time with different purposes, and all administered by the Ministry of Mines and Energy. At the end of 2006, the Ministry of Mines and Energy had approved a total of US$23.3 million rural electrification funds from these three funds and programs directed to benefit 14,965 families.

The Fund for the Electrification of Non-interconnected Zones (FANZI), was established in 2000 to assist isolated regions in the zones outside the interconnected system. It contemplated both the expansion of existing networks and the establishment of stand-alone solutions.

In 2003, a special fund known as Rural Electrification Fund (FAER), of similar characteristics to the FAZNI, was established to subsidize investment in rural areas of the interconnected system. The fund was designed to collect a surcharge of US$0.40 per MWh of electricity sold to the wholesale market, which would yield approximately US$18 million per year. Projects are presented to the FAER by the local government authorities. In order to be eligible, they must form part of the local development plan and the investment plan of the corresponding distribution utility and must also pass through the national project screening and evaluation system.

Electrification projects also receive support from the Program for Network Normalization (PRONE) that draws its resources from the National Development Plan funds.

The Institute for the Investigation and Application of Energy Solutions (IPSE) supports the Ministry of Mines and Energy in its efforts to promote rural electrification.

== Summary of private sector participation ==
Colombia has had a liberalized energy market since 1995. The sector is characterized by an unbundled generation, transmission, distribution, and commercialization framework.

With 66 registered electricity producers, private companies own 60 percent of the installed generation capacity and account for 43 percent (measured in number of consumers) to 49 percent (measured in kWh sales) of energy supplied to the interconnected grid. Transmission is carried out by seven different public companies, while distribution and commercialization are in the hands of over 60 companies, both public and private.

Activity	Private participation (%)
Generation	60%
Transmission	0%
Distribution	n/a

== Electricity and the environment ==
=== Responsibility for the environment ===
The Ministry of the Environment, Housing and Territorial Development holds the environmental responsibilities in Colombia and leads the country's commitment towards sustainable development. Within the Ministry, the Climate Change Mitigation Group addresses all the issues related with climate change.

=== Greenhouse gas emissions ===
Because of Colombia's abundant hydroelectric potential, greenhouse gas emissions are very low per capita (1.3 tCO_{2}e) and per unit of GDP (0.2 tCO_{2}e).

The Latin American Energy Organization (OLADE) estimated that CO_{2} emissions from electricity production in 2003 were 6.5 million tons of CO_{2}. Currently 30 percent of CO_{2} emissions in Colombia come from the power sector, but these could increase if thermal generation gains a larger part of the energy mix.

=== Clean Development Mechanism projects in electricity ===
As of August 2007, there are three registered Clean Development Mechanism (CDM) projects in the electricity sector in Colombia, with overall estimated emission reductions of 107,465 tCO_{2}e per year.

The Jepírachi project, in the Uribia region, is Colombia's first and only wind farm. This 19.5 MW project is expected to displace an estimated 430,000 tCO_{2} until 2019. The Jepírachi project is now in its fourth year of operation. It generated about 144 GWh and displaced about 48,500 tCO_{2}e from February 2004 to August 2006.

The other two registered projects are the Santa Ana Hydroelectric Plant, in the Bogotá's suburb Usaquén, with estimated emission reductions of 20,642 tCO_{2}e per year; and the La Vuelta and La Herradura Hydroelectric Project, in the Antioquia Department, with estimated emission reductions of 69,795 tCO_{2}e per year.

== External assistance ==
=== Inter-American Development Bank ===
The Inter-American Development Bank has currently one energy project under implementation in Colombia, the Porce III Hydroelectric Power Plant, owned by Empresas Públicas de Medellín and approved in October 2005. This is a US$900 million project, of which the IDB is contributing US$200 million.

In addition, the IDB is supporting the Colombia-Panama electric interconnection project through US$1.5 million financing for the feasibility studies phase.

== See also ==
- Economy of Colombia
- Public utilities in Colombia
- Hydroelectric power in Colombia
- List of power stations in Colombia
