= Hydroelectricity in Hungary =

Hydroelectricity is not prevalent in Hungary due to unsuitable geographical conditions and civil resentment. The country's capacity of hydroelectricity was 57 MWs in 2015.

== List of Hungarian hydroelectric dams ==
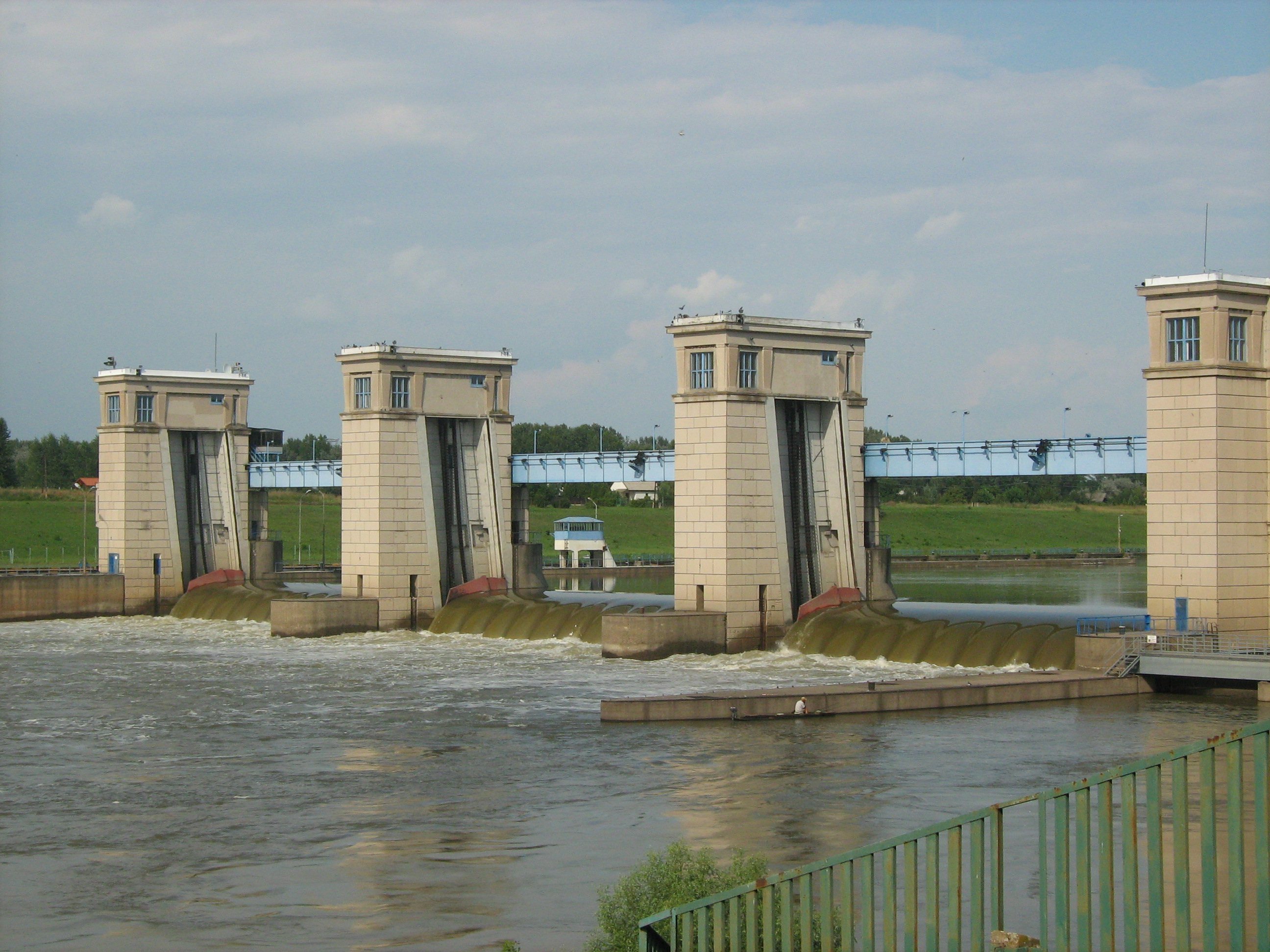
Tiszalök Dam

- Tisza Dam, Kisköre - 28 MW
- Tiszalök Dam - 12,9 MW
- Békésszentandrás Dam - 2 MW
- Ikervár Dam
- Gibárt Dam
- Kesznyéten Dam
- Kenyer Dam
- Körmend Dam

== Cancelled and future projects ==
Hungary's greatest hydroelectric project was the Gabčíkovo–Nagymaros Dams. The complex was built together with Czechoslovakia, but cancelled after the fall of Communism in Hungary. Slovakia finished the modified version of the project, unilaterally. The ICJ ruled in the legal dispute between the two countries, but the practical problems arising from the functioning of the dam are still unsettled.

Due to the environmental concerns of the Hungarian society, no major hydroelectric projects are supported by the government. However, plans exist to create new dams on the Danube to make the river more suitable for navigation.
