= Renewable energy in Colombia =

As of 2023, Colombia's renewable electricity generation capacity was 14.3 GW. Most of this capacity was hydropower. Solar power is growing fast, and in 2023 accounted for about 5% of the renewable capacity, up from almost zero five years earlier. The country has significant wind and solar resources that remains largely unexploited. According to a study by the World Bank’s Energy Sector Management Assistance Program (ESMAP), exploiting the country’s significant wind potential alone could cover more than the country’s current total energy needs.

Colombia has set targets for diversifying its energy mix by incorporating wind, solar, and geothermal resources. The country announced a net zero target at the COP26, as well as a nationally determined contribution (NDC) aiming for a 51% reduction in greenhouse gas emissions by 2030.

Total renewable energy capacity 2014–2023 (MW)
2014	2015	2016	2017	2018	2019	2020	2021	2022	2023
11,134	11,757	11,888	12,071	12,194	12,291	12,384	12,500	13,405	14,258

== Hydropower ==
With 70 percent of the country’s power generation, hydropower is a very important national energy source. The total large hydropower potential for Colombia is estimated at 93GW, with an additional 25GW of small hydropower (<20MW)

Hydropower capacity 2014–2023 (MW)
2014	2015	2016	2017	2018	2019	2020	2021	2022	2023
10,900	11,501	11,611	11,731	11,842	11,926	11,954	11,949	12,553	13,211

== Wind ==
The wind regime in Colombia is among the best in South America. Offshore regions of the northern part of Colombia, such as in the Guajira Department, have been classified with class 7 winds (over 10 meters per second (m/s)). The only other region in Latin America with such high wind power classification is the Patagonia region of Chile and Argentina.

Colombia has an estimated theoretical wind power potential of 21 GW just in the Guajira Department—enough to generate sufficient power to meet the national demand almost twice over. However, the country only has an installed capacity of 19.5 MW of wind energy, tapping only 0.4% of its theoretical wind potential. This capacity is concentrated in a single project, the Jepírachi Wind Project, developed by Empresas Públicas de Medellín (EPM) under a Carbon Finance mechanism arranged by the World Bank. There are several projects under consideration, including a 200 MW project in Ipapure.

Wind energy capacity 2014–2023 (MW)
2014	2015	2016	2017	2018	2019	2020	2021	2022	2023
18	18	18	18	18	18	18	18	18	18

In the first renewable energy auction for the country, over 1 GW of wind power was awarded in 2019 for a 15-year power purchase agreement from 2022.

== Solar ==
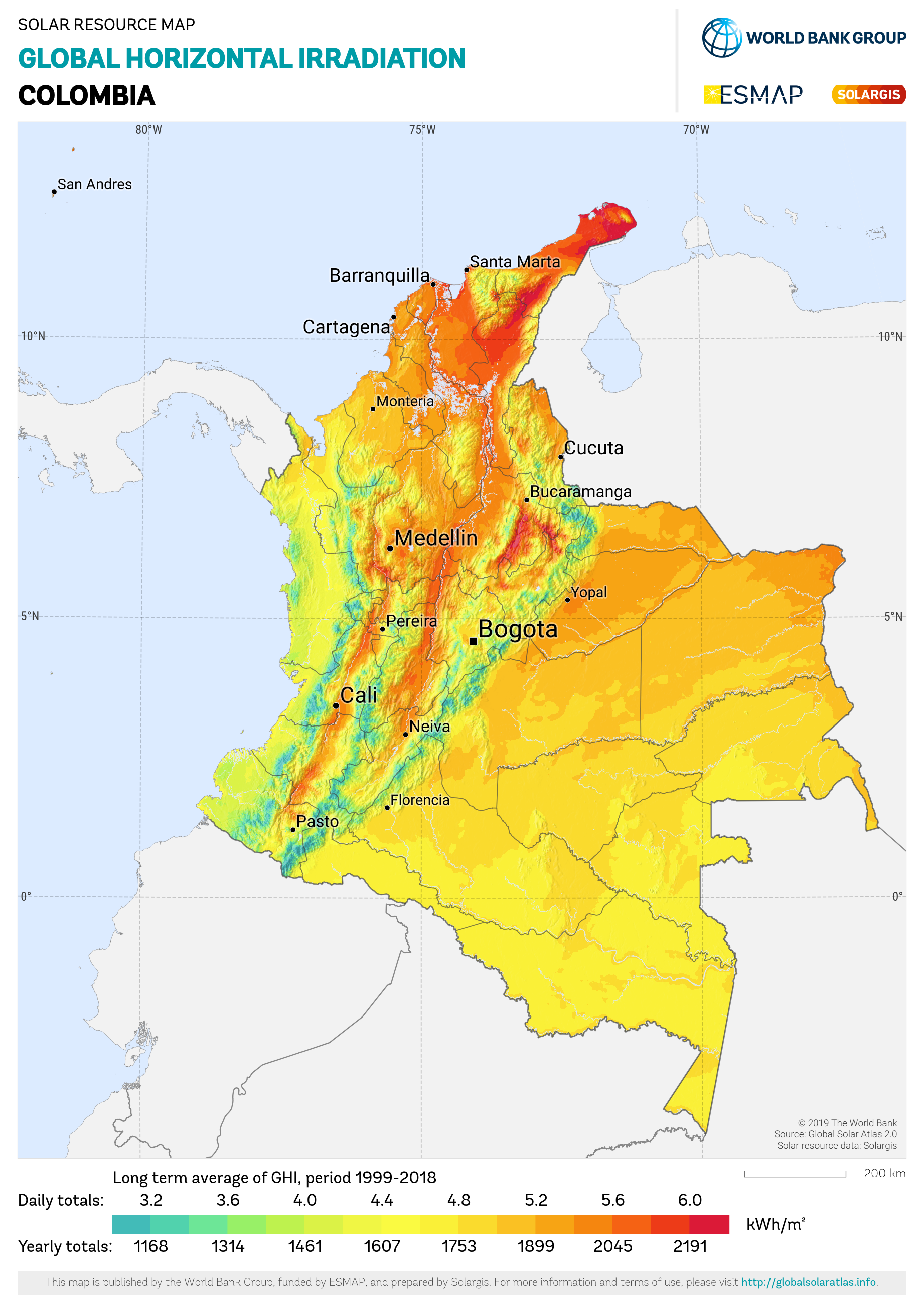
Solar potential of Colombia

Colombia has significant solar power resources because of its location in the equatorial zone, but the country sits in a complex region of the Andes where climatic conditions vary. The daily average radiation is 4.5 kWh/m2, and the area with the best solar resource is the Guajira Peninsula, with 6 kWh/m2 of radiation.

Solar energy capacity 2014–2023 (MW)
2014	2015	2016	2017	2018	2019	2020	2021	2022	2023
1	1	2	11	13	26	83	181	480	676

== Geothermal ==
The former Colombian Institute of Electrical Energy, today now IPSE, and the Latin American Energy Organization have identified three areas with geothermal power potential:

- Azufral, in Nariño Department, where the Azufral Volcano is located;
- Cerro Negro-Tufiño, also in Nariño Department, near the Chiles Volcano; and
- Paipa, located in the Cordillera Oriental in Boyacá Department.

The first small-scale geothermal project began operations in 2021, generating 100 kW.

== Biomass ==
Colombia has some potential to generate energy from agricultural residues (banana, coffee pulp, and animal waste). Its annual biomass power potential is estimated to be over 16 GWh, which is still less than 0.1% of current electricity production. The potential is distributed as follows:

- 11,828 MWh/yr from agriculture residues
- 2,640 MWh/yr from bioethanol
- 698 MWh/yr from natural forest residues
- 658 MWh/yr from biodiesel
- 442 MWh/yr from planted forest residues

The region of Urabá in the north of the Department of Antioquia has approximately 19,000 hectares of banana plantations, producing more than 1 million tons annually. It has also been estimated that approximately 85,000 TOE/yr could be produced from the 190 million m3/yr of biogas generated from coffee plantations, equivalent to 995,000 MWh.

In addition, the landfills in the four main cities in Colombia (Bogotá, Medellín, Cali, and Barranquilla) are estimated to have the potential to provide for an installed capacity of 47 MW (0.3% of current installed capacity).

Bioenergy capacity 2014–2023 (MW)
2014	2015	2016	2017	2018	2019	2020	2021	2022	2023
215	237	257	310	320	320	329	351	353	353
