= Florakis =

Florakis (Greek: Φλωράκης) is a Greek surname. Notable people with the surname include:

- Charilaos Florakis (1914–2005), leader of the Communist Party of Greece
- Evangelos Florakis (1943–2002), Greek Army officer
