= Dhekelia Power Station =

Power plant belonging to the Electricity Authority of Cyprus

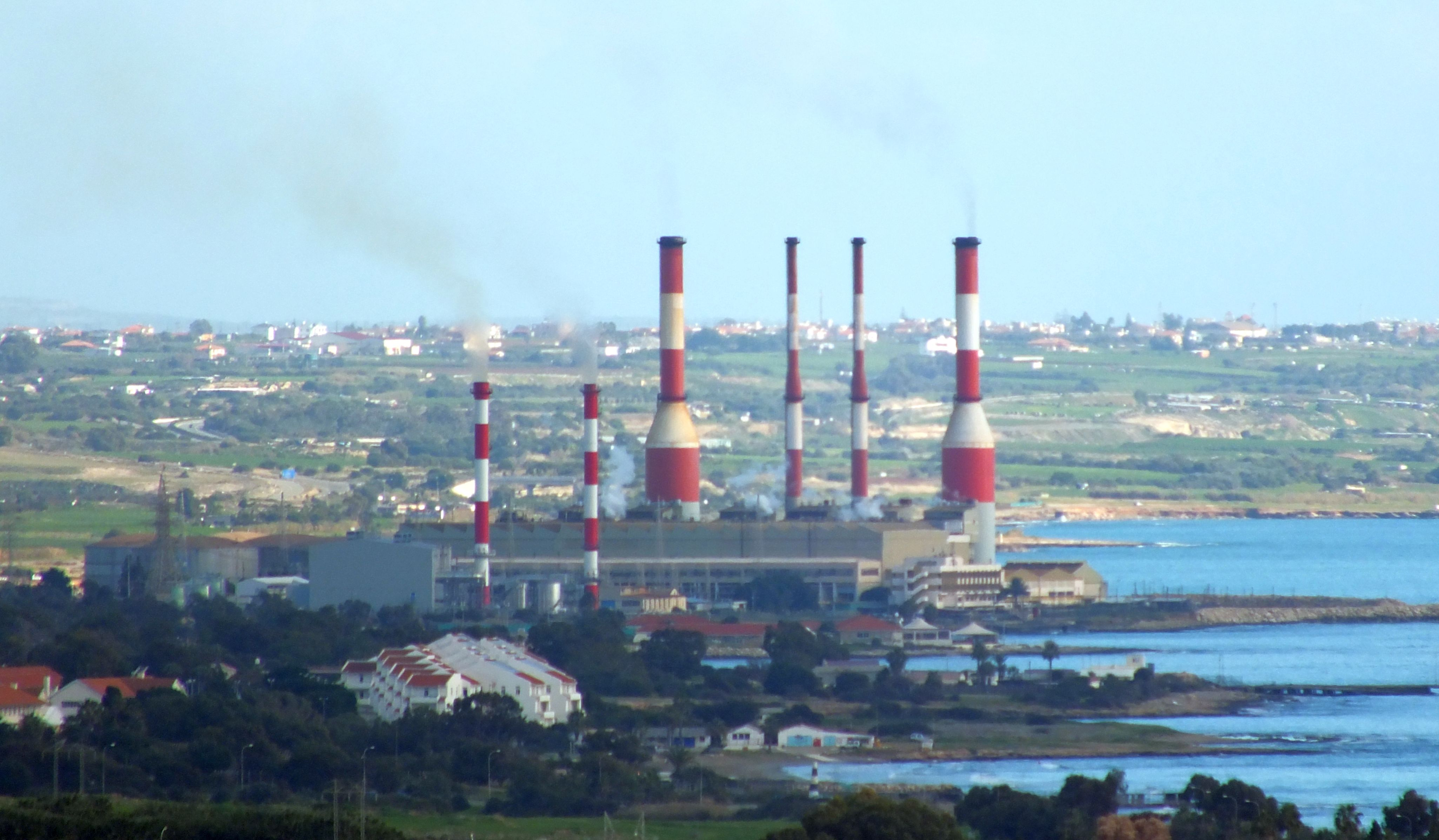
- Country: Cyprus
- Location: East of Larnaca
- Coordinates: 34°58′49″N 33°44′45″E
- Status: Operational
- Commission date: 1982
- Owner: Electricity Authority of Cyprus
- Operator: Electricity Authority of Cyprus

Thermal power station
- Primary fuel: Heavy fuel oil

Power generation
- Make and model: Siemens; Toshiba; Alstom; Bharat Heavy Electricals; MAN; Wärtsilä
- Nameplate capacity: 460 MW

External links
- Website: www.cpa.gov.cy/CPA/page.php?pageID=12&mpath=%2F6

Dhekelia Power Station is one of three power plants belonging to the Electricity Authority of Cyprus. It is located approximately 15 kilometres (9.3 mi) east of the city of Larnaca and it has a capacity of 460 MW.

== History ==
The original plant was the first of the company, which started building it in the mid-1950s. Completed, it consisted of seven steam turbo generators with a total capacity of 84 MW. As the machinery grew old and demand rose steadily, a new plant was built next to the old.

Built in five phases, the current power plant consists of six steam turbines, each of a capacity of 60 MW and six diesel engines of approximately 17 MW each. All boilers burn heavy fuel oil and were built by Waagner-Biro. The first two turbines and generators were supplied by Siemens and came online in 1982 and 1983. Turbines 3 and 4 were made by Toshiba and the corresponding generators by Alstom and came online in 1986. The steam plant was completed with the supply of turbogenerators 5 and 6 from Bharat Heavy Electricals in 1992 and 1993. The six diesel engines run on either heavy fuel oil or diesel oil, with the first three being two-stroke MAN SE ones erected by Mitsui in 2009 and the other three being four-stroke ones manufactured by Wärtsilä in 2010.

The original plant was demolished in the early 2000s.

The Dhekelia Power Station, divided by a British road into two parts, also belongs to the Republic of Cyprus. The northern part is an enclave, like the two villages, whereas the southern part is located by the sea, and therefore not an enclave, though it has no territorial waters of its own. Those villages are Xylotympou and Ormideia.

== See also ==
- Energy in Cyprus
