= Moni Power Station =

Power station in Cyprus

- Country: Cyprus
- Location: East of Limassol
- Coordinates: 34°42′38″N 33°10′57″E
- Status: Decommissioned
- Commission date: 1966
- Owner: Electricity Authority of Cyprus
- Operator: Electricity Authority of Cyprus

Thermal power station
- Primary fuel: Heavy fuel oil

Power generation
- Units operational: 5 × 25 MW in storage 4 × 35 MW
- Make and model: English Electric; Parsons; EGT; Thomassen
- Nameplate capacity: 265 MW

Moni Power Station is the second power plant the Electricity Authority of Cyprus built. It is located some 20 kilometres (12 mi) east of Limassol. Construction started in the 1960s and when completed it consisted of six steam turbogenerators each having a capacity of 30 MW. Heavy fuel oil was fired in all boilers. All six steam turbogenerators have been decommissioned and are in storage as of 2013.

In the late 1980s, four gas turbines using distillate fuel oil no. 2 (usually called "diesel" or "gasoil") were added and now rated at 35 MW each.

As of June 2025, the Republic of Cyprus had undergone planning for the installation of new mobile water desalination units at the Moni Power Station site with operations planned to begin by July 2025.

These units were gifted to Cyprus by the United Arab Emirates.

Phase one of the project is projected to produce a total daily capacity of 15,000 cubic meters of desalinated water

== See also ==
- Energy in Cyprus
