= Cyprus A gas field =

Cypriot gas field in the Levantine Sea

Cyprus A
- Country: Cyprus
- Region: Levantine Sea
- Offshore/onshore: offshore
- Operator: Noble Energy

Field history
- Discovery: 2011
- Start of production: 2015

Production
- Current production of gas: 8.6×10^{6} m^{3}/d 300×10^{6} cu ft/d 3.1×10^{9} m^{3}/a (110×10^{9} cu ft/a)
- Recoverable gas: 351×10^{9} m^{3} 12.3×10^{12} cu ft

The Cyprus A gas field is a Cypriot natural gas field that was discovered in 2011. It will begin production in 2015 and will produce natural gas and condensates. The total proven reserves of the Cyprus A gas field are around 7 trillion cubic feet (200 billion m³) and production is slated to be around 300 million cubic feet/day (8.6 million m³).

== See also ==
- Energy in Cyprus
- Aphrodite gas field
