= Evangelos Florakis Naval Base =

Cyprus Navy base

Coordinates: 34°43′30″N 33°16′55″E

Evankelos Florakis Naval Base
- Ναυτική Βάση Ευάγγελος Φλωράκης
- Cyprus
- Seal of the command of the base

Site information
- Type: Naval base
- Controlled by: Cypriot National Guard: Cyprus Navy

Site history
- Events: Evangelos Florakis Naval Base explosion

The Evangelos Florakis Naval Base (Greek: Ναυτική Βάση «Ευάγγελος Φλωράκης») is a Cyprus Navy base, situated on the island's southern coast adjacent to the Vasilikos industrial area and power plant, near Zygi, between Limassol and Larnaca.

== Operations ==
The base was known for decades as the Mari Naval Base. It was renamed after Lt. General Evangelos Florakis, who was killed in a helicopter crash in July 2002 while serving as the head of the Cypriot National Guard.

Prior to 11 July 2011, it was the main location of the Command of the Navy Base and one of the five primary commands (also referred to as sub-commands) of the Navy. It was responsible for overseeing all naval shore installations, facilities and associated personnel. The Command's current status is unclear.

== Expansion ==
In an interview with Phileleftheros, in December 2024, President Nikos Christodoulides detailed the government's €14.7 million initiative to enhance the Andreas Papandreou air base in Paphos and the Mari naval base. The upgrades are planned to be completed within 18 months and aim to bolster Cyprus' strategic infrastructure while ensuring that both bases remain under Cypriot control.

As a component of the EU's joint military development programme (PESCO), Cyprus designed various upgrades in its defence infrastructure. In 2019 serving Cypriot Defence Minister Savvas Angelides signed a letter of intent with his French counterpart Florence Parly. Speaking at a news conference, he said the expansion of the Evangelos Florakis Naval Base was linked to a military cooperation deal with EU partner states such as France. It was reported that a new docking area was to be built for larger warships.

== Incident ==
In February 2009 a Cypriot-flagged vessel carrying 98 shipping containers of military material including explosives, intended for Syria, was intercepted in the Red Sea; the containers were stored at the Evangelos Florakis base, exposed to sunlight. On 11 July 2011 they exploded, killing 13 people and causing more than €3bn of damage. The Commander of the Naval Base, Lambros Lambrou and the head of the Cyprus Navy, Naval Commander Andreas Ioannides, were both killed.

== See also ==
- List of Cyprus military bases
