= Evangelos Florakis Naval Base explosion =

2011 self-detonation of a munitions stockpile in Cyprus

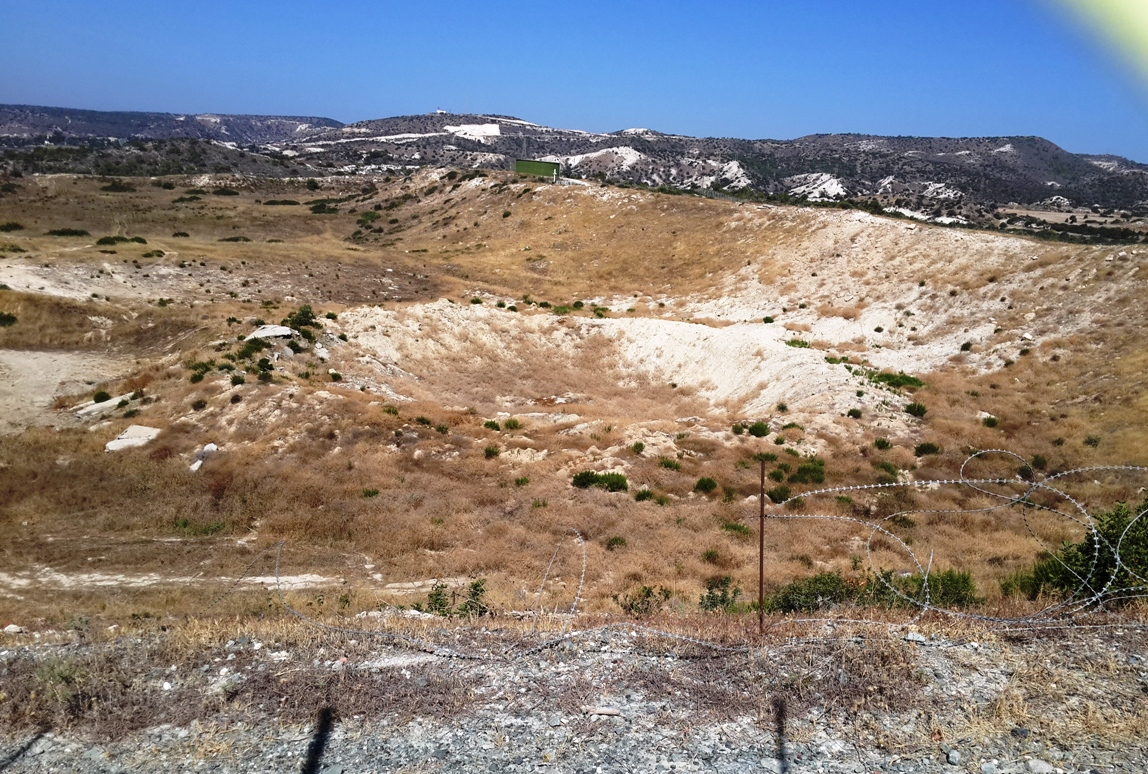
- The crater produced by the explosion, photographed in 2013
- Native name: Έκρηξη στη ναυτική βάση «Ευάγγελος Φλωράκης»
- Date: 11 July 2011
- Time: 05:50 EEST
- Location: Mari, Cyprus; 34°43′41″N 33°17′08″E
- Type: Accidental explosion
- Perpetrator: Christofias Administration (accidentally)
- Deaths: 13
- Injuries: 62

On 11 July 2011, at Evangelos Florakis Naval Base, situated at Mari, Larnaca District in Cyprus, a large amount of ammunition and military explosives self-detonated, killing 13 people, including the Commander of the Cyprus Navy, Andreas Ioannides, the base commander, Lambros Lambrou, and six firefighters. A further 62 people were injured. So intense was the explosion that debris was blown as far as 3km (2 miles) from the base. The explosion was the worst peacetime military accident ever recorded in Cyprus, with a yield of approximately 481 tons TNT equivalent, as determined by the official investigation into the accident. It was the largest artificial non-nuclear explosion of the 21st century until the 2020 Beirut explosions.

== Background ==
In open storage on the base were 98 containers of 120 mm, 122 mm, 125 mm, and 160 mm high explosive artillery shells, 7.62 mm shell casings, compressed gunpowder, silver dollar-sized slugs, primers, and magnesium primers that had been seized by the United States Navy in 2009 after it intercepted a Cypriot-flagged, Russian-owned vessel, Monchegorsk, travelling from Iran to Syria in the Red Sea, alleging it was in violation of UN sanctions against Iranian arms exports. According to leaked US diplomatic cables, released in 2011, the US through Hillary Clinton exerted pressure on Cyprus to confiscate the shipment. The ship was escorted to a Cypriot port and the Cyprus Navy was given responsibility for the explosives, which it moved to Evangelos Florakis Naval Base a month later.

At the time of the incident in 2011, the explosives had apparently been left in the open for over two years. The Cypriot government had declined offers from Germany, the United Kingdom and the United States to remove or dispose of the material, fearing an adverse reaction from Syria. The government had instead requested that the United Nations effect the removal, but claimed that its request had been rejected.

== Explosion ==
The explosion occurred at 05:50 EEST (02:50 UTC) following a fire caused by explosions of several containers starting one hour and 20 minutes earlier. The proximate cause of the initial fire remains unknown. Extensive damage was caused in a wide area surrounding the blast. The Vasilikos Power Station, the largest power facility on Cyprus, which provided approximately half the island's electricity, was severely damaged, causing widespread power cuts which affected much of Nicosia, the Cypriot capital, over 40 miles (65 km) from Evangelos Florakis Naval Base.

The blast killed 12 people on the spot and injured a further 62, of whom two were injured seriously with one dying later, increasing the number of dead to 13. Among those killed were Captain Andreas Ioannides, the Commander of the Navy (the head of the Cyprus Navy) and Commander Lambros Lambrou, the commander of Evangelos Florakis Naval Base. Also killed were four other Cyprus Navy personnel and six civilian firefighters who had been tackling the small blaze that led to the explosion.

== Aftermath ==
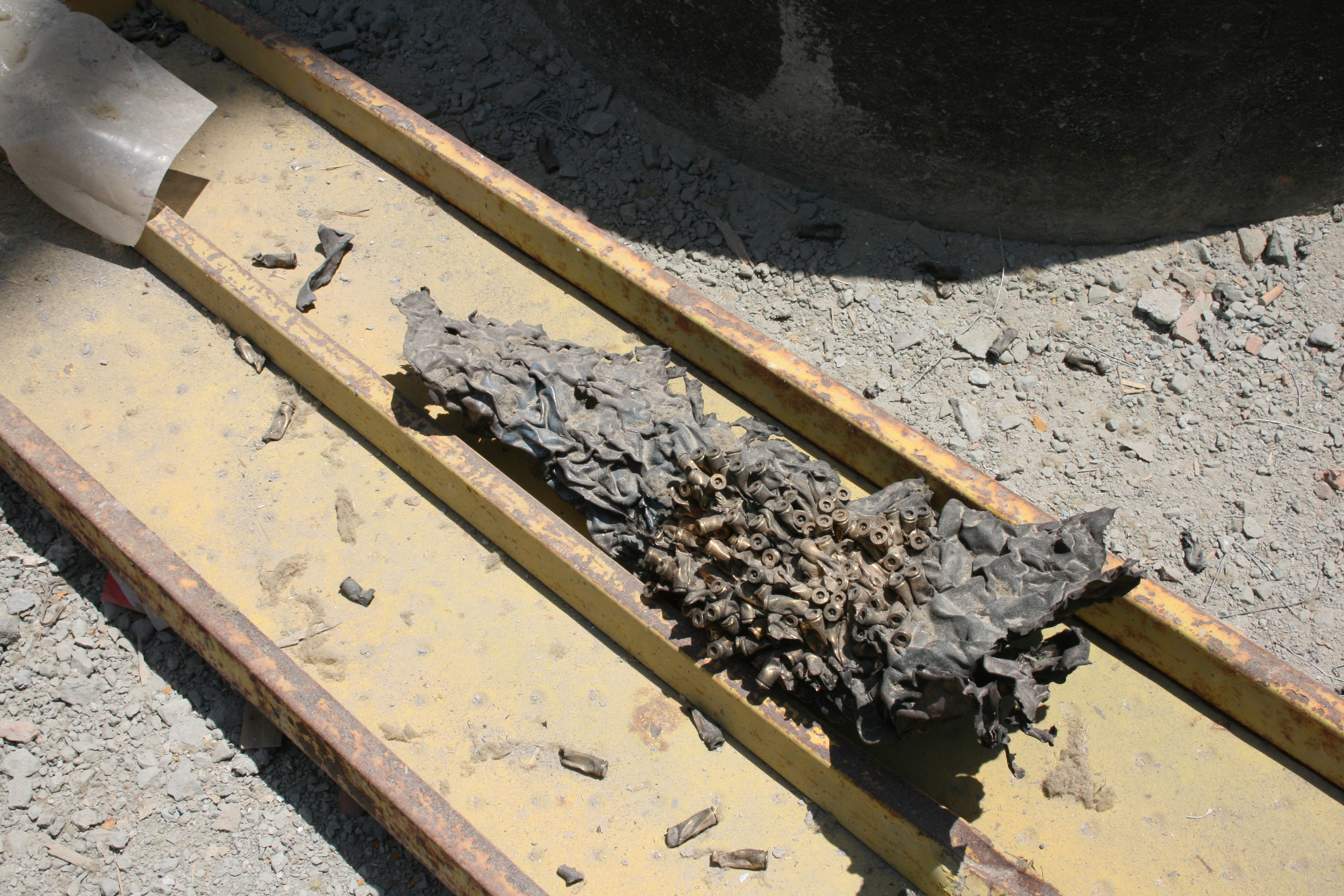
The remains of a box of small-arms ammunition, found after the explosion

The €700 million Vasilikos Power Station was reduced to a "mangled shell", and the electricity supply to approximately half of Cyprus was interrupted. The Electricity Authority of Cyprus (EAC) later instituted rolling blackouts in order to conserve the supply and stated that it would import generators from Greece and Israel while the damage, estimated at €2 billion, was being repaired. The rolling blackouts lasted for two to three hours in each area and were planned to affect only residential areas.

The station's installed capacity was 47% of EAC's total and would have soon increased to 55% with the delivery of Unit 5. A private deal was signed on 16 July for the supply of up to 80 MW from Northern Cyprus until the end of August.

Funerals were held for the majority of the dead, including Ioannides, on 13 July. Concerns were raised that some of the substances in the containers may have been toxic, but the Cypriot Health Minister announced on 20 July that no public health risk had been detected, although residents would be kept under observation as a "precautionary measure".

== Political repercussions ==
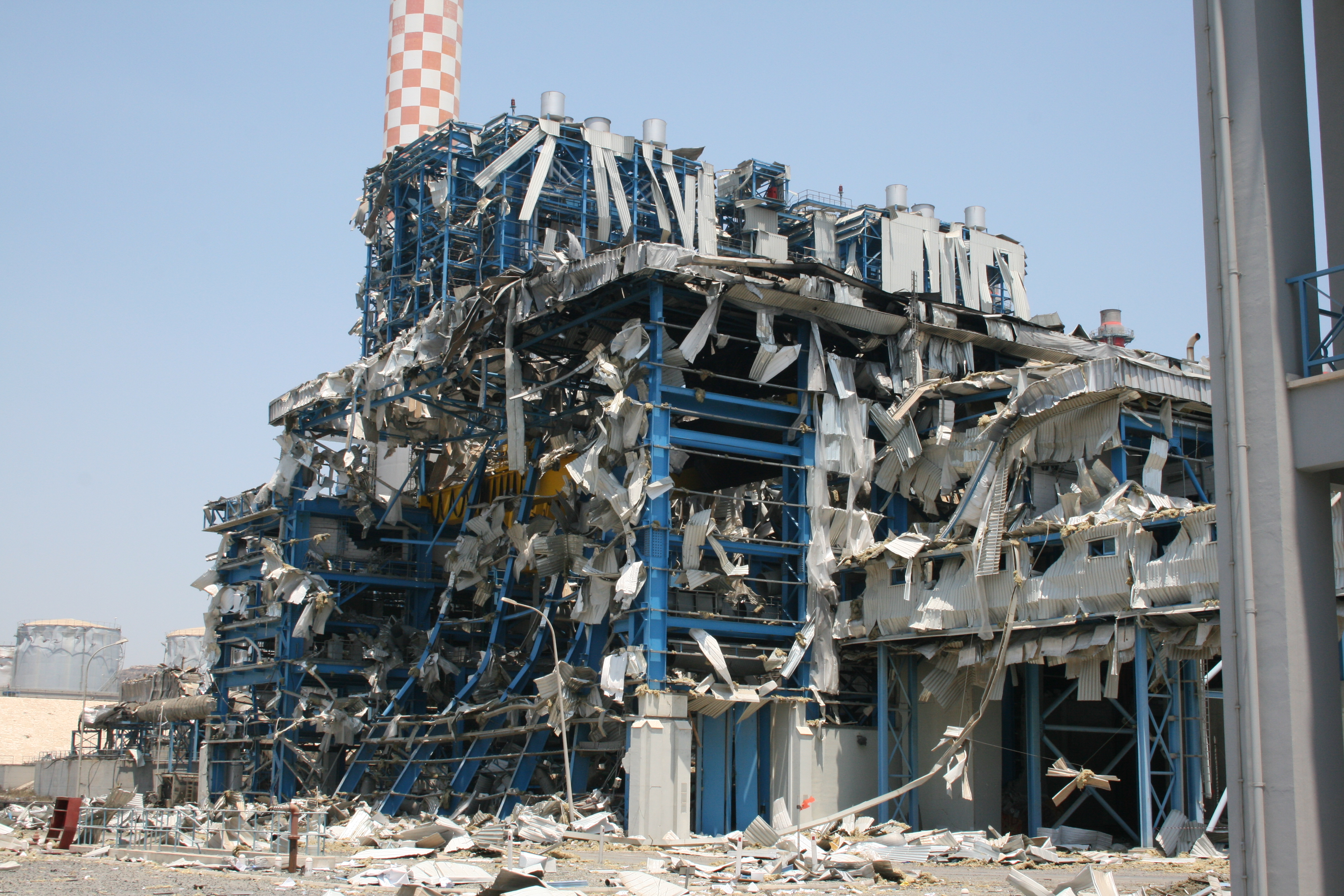
The Vasilikos power station two days after the explosion

As a result of the incident, demonstrations were held in the capital Nicosia by angered citizens, leading to the resignation of the Cypriot Defence Minister, Costas Papacostas, and the National Guard Commander-in-Chief, General Petros Tsalikidis. The government announced that an independent inquiry into the incident would be held and Cyprus Police announced that it would launch a criminal investigation. The explosion destroyed several houses and over 250 others suffered lesser damage, displacing approximately 150 people.

Several thousand people upset by the Cypriot government's failure to dispose of the explosives held a demonstration in the capital Nicosia on 12 July. A group of about fifty broke away from the demonstration and stormed the grounds of the Presidential Palace, demanding the resignation of Dimitris Christofias, President of Cyprus. The breakaway group was almost immediately apprehended by the Cyprus Police, who nonetheless used tear gas ten minutes after the incident had begun in an attempt to disperse the crowds. The protests continued into 13 July and 20 people were arrested during the disorder.

On 19 July, Markos Kyprianou, the Cypriot Foreign Minister, resigned, becoming the second cabinet minister to resign over the explosion. On 3 October, Polys Polyviou, the independent state-appointed investigator charged to look into potential responsibility by state and other officials leading to the 11 July blast, released a 643-page document detailing the findings of his investigation, concluding that Cypriot president Dimitris Christofias was mainly to blame for the events that led to the explosion. According to the investigation, the president had institutional and very serious personal responsibility for the disaster. The investigator said that the attorney-general should look into the possibility that serious crimes—including manslaughter—were committed by all involved, without exception. President Christofias rejected the results of the investigation, denied any personal responsibility and accused Polyviou of exceeding his mandate.

== Economic repercussions ==
Of Cyprus' US$24.66bn economy, the EU estimates that the cost of the explosion to the island could amount to US$2.83bn, with cost of the power plant itself coming to US$992m. This was weeks before the Bank of Cyprus and other business leaders said "deep spending cuts are needed fast."
