= Electricity Authority of Cyprus =

Energy company in Cyprus

Electricity Authority of Cyprus (EAC) Αρχή Ηλεκτρισμού Κύπρου (ΑΗΚ)
- Company type: Semi-government organization (Name of state-owned companies in Cyprus)
- Industry: Energy
- Founded: 1952
- Headquarters: Nicosia, Cyprus
- Area served: Cyprus
- Key people: George Petrou (Chairman)
- Products: Electric power
- Services: Electric power distribution
- Revenue: ▲€1.327 billion (2022)
- Operating income: ▲€21.86 million (2022)
- Net income: ▲€12.89 million (2022)
- Total assets: ▲€2.272 billion (2022)
- Total equity: ▲€1.268 billion (2022)
- Owner: Government of Cyprus
- Number of employees: 2,200 (2022)
- Website: eac.com.cy

The Electricity Authority of Cyprus (EAC) (Greek: Αρχή Ηλεκτρισμού Κύπρου (ΑΗΚ)) was founded in 1952 by the British colonial government. The 28 private electricity companies of the time were nationalized and absorbed into the EAC. The Authority never received any subsidies from the government as these have always been prohibited by law. Its head office is located in Strovolos. The EAC currently holds a near monopoly on electricity generation in Cyprus. It operates through three power stations with a total capacity of 1460 MW:

- Dhekelia Power Station - 460 MW
- Moni Power Station - 150 MW
- Vasilikos Power Station - 868 MW

The company also distributes electricity produced by five privately held windfarms:

- Orites - 82 MW
- Agia Anna - 20 MW
- Alexigros - 31.5 MW
- Koshi - 10.8 MW
- Aeolian - 10.8 MW

Additionally, individuals, private companies, and the Government own almost 54 MW of solar panels and almost 10 MW of biofuel installations and the EAC distributes the electricity these produce too.

In 2015, the EAC generated a total of 4,128 GWh of electricity consuming 947,226 tonnes of fuel costing €288,632,000. Maximum demand in the areas controlled by the Republic of Cyprus reached 939 MW. A total of 2.0 GWh of the produced electricity in 2015 valued €240,000 ended up in the area occupied by Turkey and no money could be collected for it.

The Authority served 559,700 customers in 2015, that is 280 per employee, up from 260 in 2014. The electricity sales per employee reached 2.02 GWh, up from 1.83 GWh in 2014.

Company investments in 2015 on its assets reached €17,721,000.

On 11 July 2011, a total of 98 containers of munitions stored at Evangelos Florakis Naval Base adjacent to Vasilikos Power Station exploded causing extensive damage to the station. To cope with the extended loss of its largest power station, the Authority had to impose rolling blackouts. In 2010, the maximum demand had reached 1,144 MW, the highest ever, and an even higher one was expected in 2011.

As a precondition to the accession of Cyprus to the European Union, the local market for electricity generation has been opened to private companies, but so far no private power plants have been built, although four licences have been granted by Cyprus Energy Regulatory Authority. In the meanwhile, the EAC diversified into communication and cable television services in cooperation with a private company.

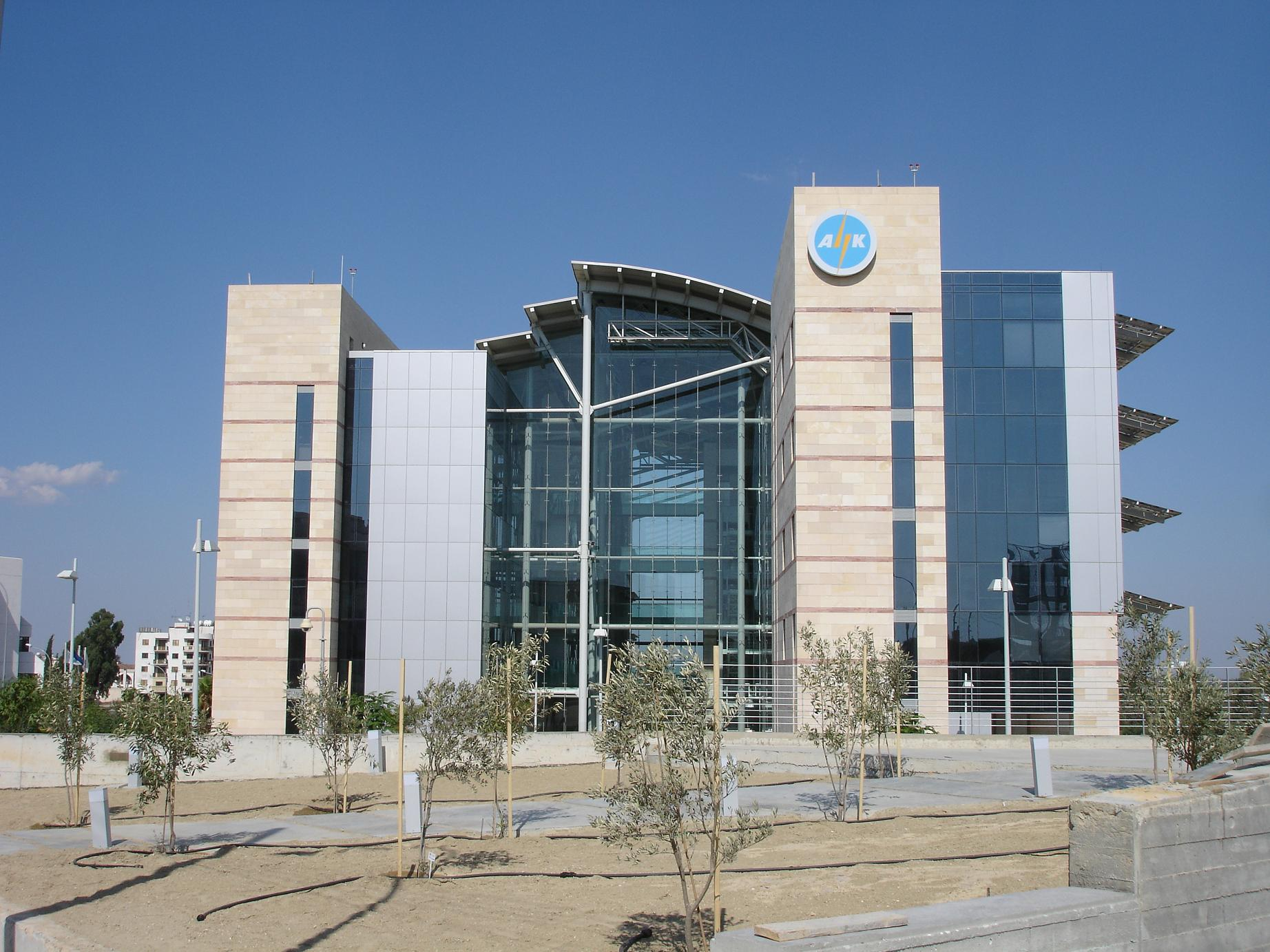
The headquarters of the Authority

In 2005, the company was involved in a high profile scandal involving the alleged theft of millions of Cypriot pounds from the employees' pension scheme.

On 1 January 2021, EAC's electricity supply monopoly ended and Bioland Promithia Ltd, became the first private utility company in Cyprus to directly retail electricity to its growing commercial customer base.

== See also ==
- Energy in Cyprus
