= Solar power in Austria =

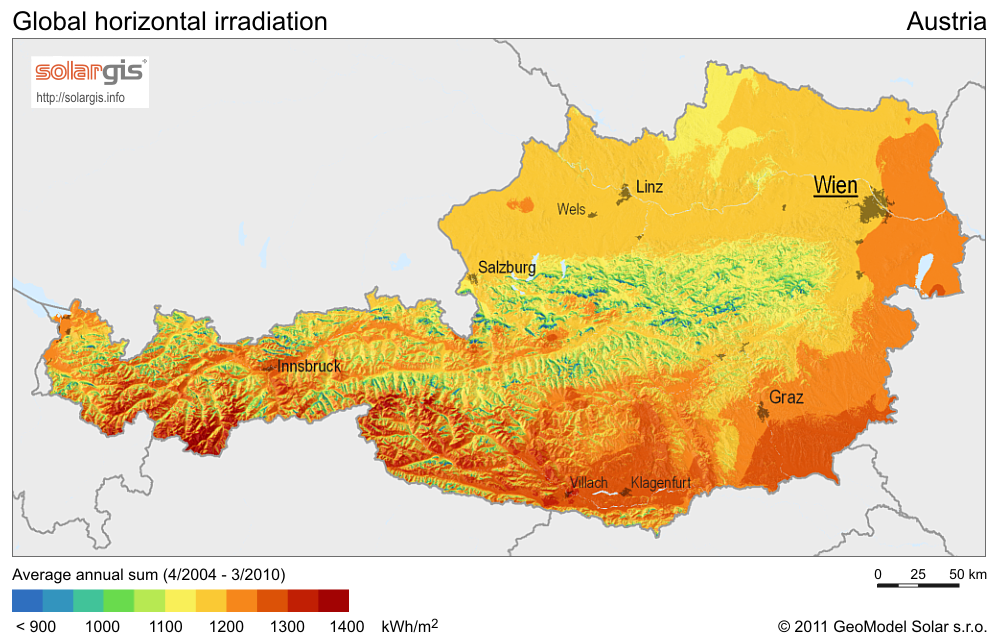
- Solar irradiation map of Austria
- Installed capacity: 8.48 GW (2024) (22nd)
- Annual generation: 8.82 TWh (2024)
- Capacity per capita: 946 W (2024)
- Share of electricity: 11.2% (2024)

Solar power in Austria contributes 8.82 TWh of generation to the Austrian grid, accounting for 11.2% of total electric power generation as of 2024, with 8.48 GW of installed capacity.

In addition to supporting PV installations through permitting simplification and cash grants, the Austrian government is targeting 100% renewable electricity generation by 2030.

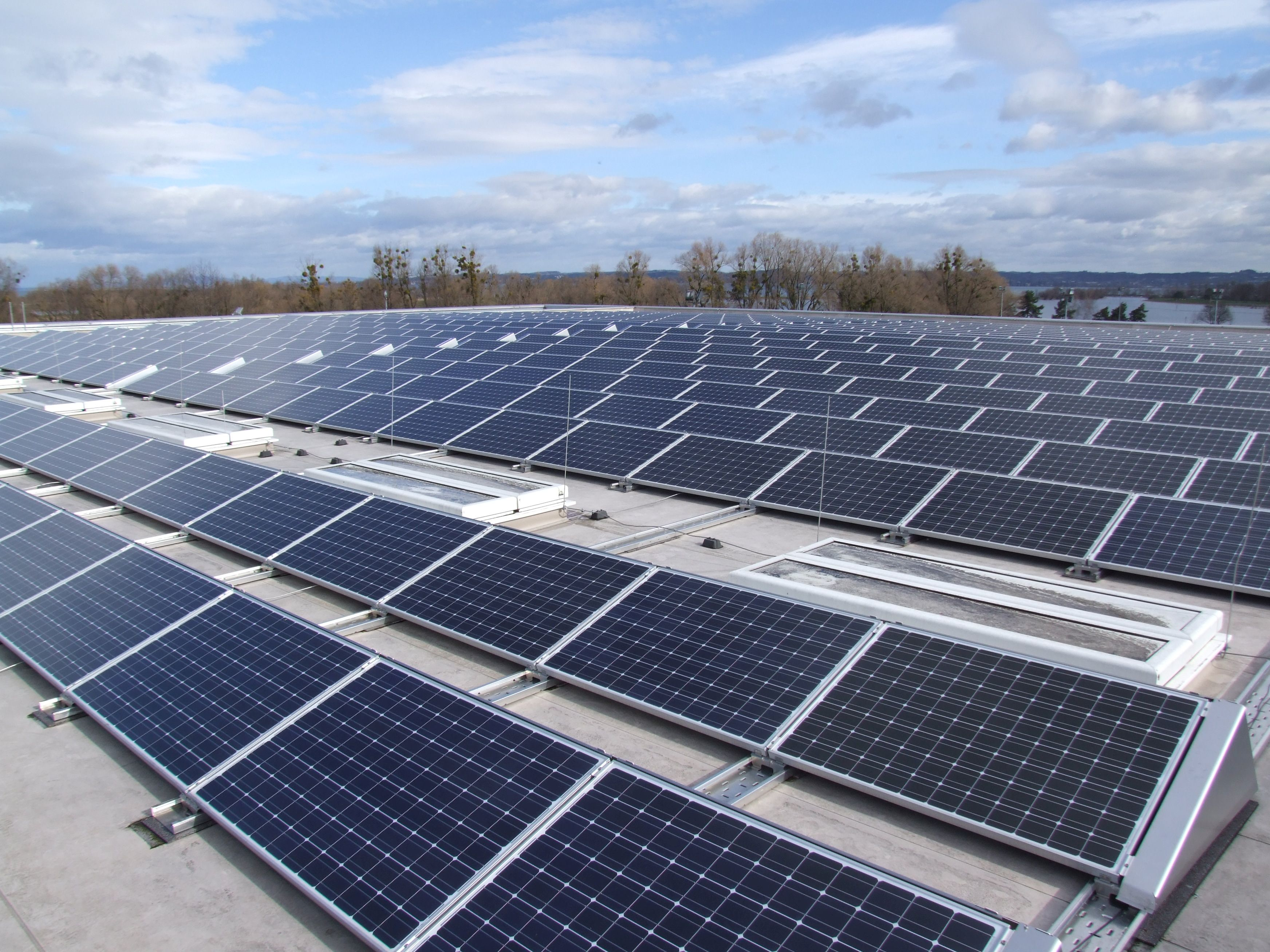
Solar roof, sports hall, Vorarlberg

In 2009, the site of Zwentendorf power station became Austria's largest solar power station with an investment of 1.2 million Euro, with the addition of 1,000 photovoltaic panels. Zwentendorf was intended to be Austria's first nuclear power plant, but after a vote in 1978 prohibiting nuclear power in Austria, was never completed. In September, 2011, Austria's largest solar power station, 2 MW, was under construction in the Niedere Tauern mountain range.

Austria has also a large capacity of solar heating at its disposal. With more than 3,500 MW_{thermal} the country ranks second in the EU, only behind much larger Germany.

== Targets ==
Austria aims to achieve a 100% renewable electricity production by 2030 with 1,000,000 homes having solar panels fitted by that date. 11 TWh of extra photovoltaics will be needed above 2021 levels.

== Photovoltaic installations ==
=== Statistics ===
Added capacity since 1992 in (MW_{p})
Cumulative capacity since 1992 in (MW_{p})

Austria 2013 - key figures
Final electricity consumption	56 TWh
Inhabitants	8 million
Irradiation	1,027 kWh/kW
PV installations in 2013	263 MW
PV cumulative capacity in 2013	626 MW
PV penetration	1.1%
Source: IEA-PVPS, Trends2014

Photovoltaic installations in Austria since 1999
Year	Added (MW_{p})	Cumulative (MW_{p})	Refs
1999	0.8	3.7	Trends2013
2000	1.2	4.9	Trends2013
2001	1.6	6.5	Trends2013
2002	3.8	10.3	Trends2013
2003	6.5	16.8	Trends2013
2004	4.3	21.1	Trends2013
2005	2.9	24.0	Trends2013
2006	1.6	25.6	Trends2013
2007	3.1	28.7	Trends2013
2008	3.7	32.4	Trends2013
2009	20.2	52.6	Trends2013
2010	42.9	95.5	Trends2013
2011	91.7	187.2	Trends2013
2012	176	362.9	Trends2013
2013	263	626	Trends2014
2014	140	766	Snapshot2014
2015	171	937	Snapshot2020
2016	159	1096	Snapshot2020
2017	131	1268	Snapshot2020
2018	187	1455	Snapshot2020
2019	247	1702	Snapshot2020
2020	341	2043	energie.gv.at
2021	740	2783	energie.gv.at
2022	1009	3792	energie.gv.at
2023	2603	6890	energie.gv.at
2024	2509	9398	energie.gv.at
Source: IEA-PVPS, Trends2013, Trends2014, Snapshot2014, Snapshot2020, energie.gv.at

== See also ==
- Solar power in the European Union
- Wind power in Austria
- List of renewable energy topics by country
