= Renewable energy in the Czech Republic =

Renewable energy in the Czech Republic includes biomass, biogas, hydropower, solar energy and wind power. In 2024, renewable sources supplied 19.2% of gross final energy consumption in the Czech Republic. Renewables covered 29.1% of energy use for heating and cooling, 17.9% of electricity consumption and 5.7% of transport energy use, according to figures calculated using Eurostat.

Bioenergy provides most of the country’s renewable energy, mainly for heating. It is also used to generate electricity and produce transport fuels.

== Bioenergy ==
Bioenergy accounted for 11% of the Czech Republic’s total energy supply and 13% of final energy consumption in 2023. Around 80% of bioenergy was consumed directly in end-use sectors, mainly for heating; the remainder was converted into electricity and heat by energy producers.

Wood is used for heating homes and supplying industrial boilers and district-heating networks. Other biomass fuels include agricultural residues and spent pulping liquors from paper production. Biomass accounted for 74% of renewable heat production in 2025. Electricity output from biomass was 3.06 TWh and from biogas 2.58 TWh.

Czech biogas plants use crops, sewage sludge and biodegradable waste. A 2016 study linked the growth of agricultural biogas production to increased cultivation of maize for use in the plants. Biogas is used to generate electricity and heat, or purified to produce biomethane. The International Energy Agency identified opportunities to make greater use of heat from existing plants by connecting them to nearby settlements.

Hostětín’s municipal heating plant has burned wood chips since 2000. Kněžice brought a biogas plant and biomass boilers into operation in 2006. The biogas plant and biomass boilers are municipally owned and provide heating for the village. The biogas plant also produces electricity for sale to the grid.

The availability of sustainable biomass limits further expansion. A 2024 government assessment examined fuel supplies alongside effects on forests, biodiversity and air quality.

== Solar power ==
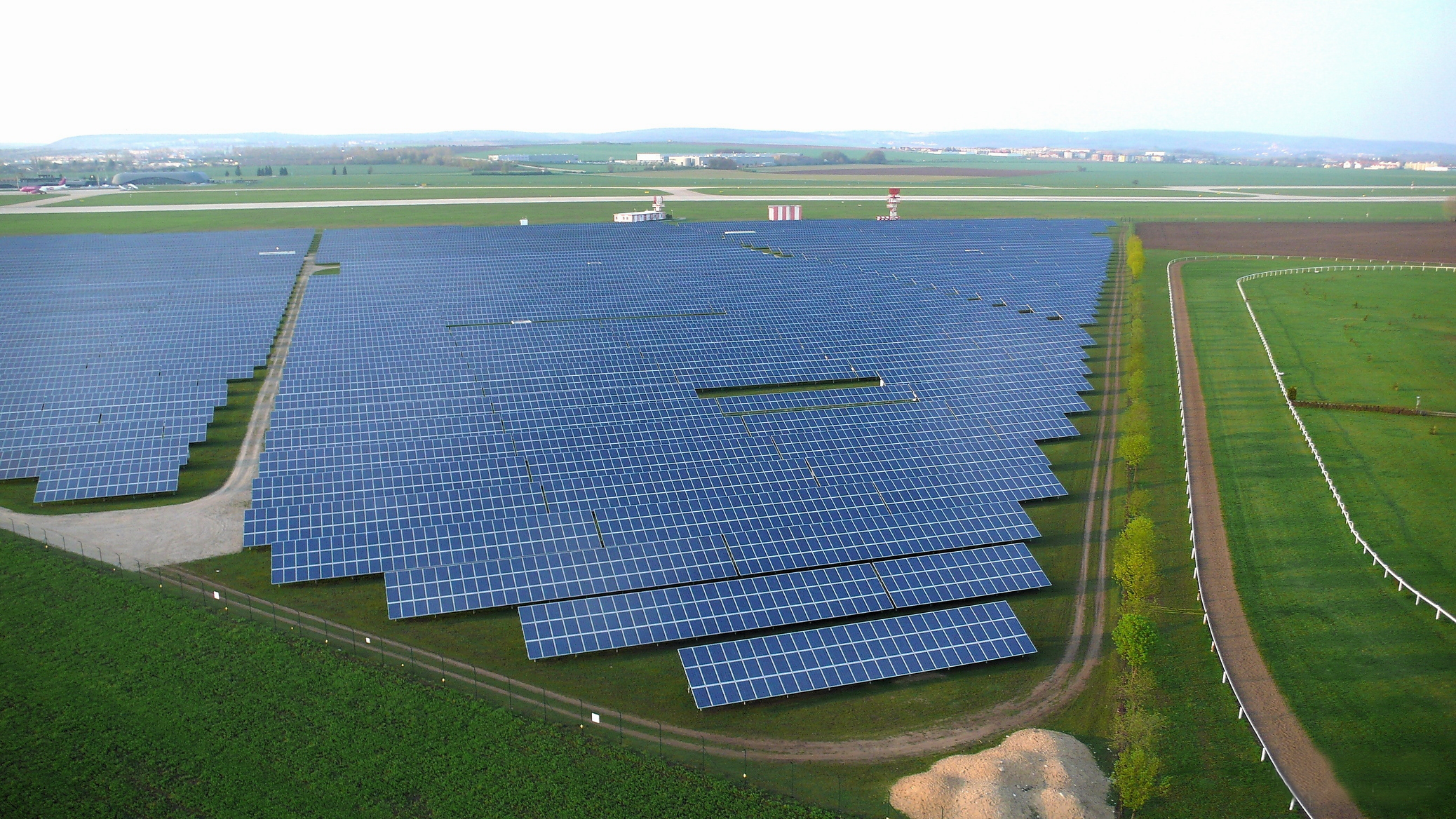
Photovoltaic power station at Brno-Tuřany

Photovoltaic installations expanded rapidly in 2009 and 2010 under a feed-in tariff scheme. Changes to the support system then reduced investment from 2011. Last period of expansion was led by rooftop installations, in contrast to the predominantly large solar plants built during the earlier boom.

In 2024, 44,593 photovoltaic systems with a combined capacity of 967 MWp were installed. Total photovoltaic capacity reached 4,430 MWp by the end of the year. 429 MWp of solar capacity was installed on homes. Business installations and larger solar plants accounted for another 539 MWp.

The IEA reported in 2025 that larger solar projects faced delays in getting permits and connecting to the grid.

=== Solar thermal ===
Solar thermal collectors provide hot water and supplementary space heating. Their installation has been supported through the New Green Savings programme. Solar thermal collectors in operation in 2025 had a total area of about 658,000 m², according to ministry estimates.

== Wind power ==
The Czech Republic ended 2025 with about 378 MW of installed wind power capacity. They generated 666 GWh of electricity that year, compared with 717 GWh in 2024. There was almost no growth in installed wind capacity between 2019 and 2022, when it remained at about 339 MW. It rose to 378 MW by the end of 2025. The main regions for wind power are Ústí nad Labem, Karlovy Vary, Olomouc, Liberec and Moravian-Silesian.

In 2025, the IEA reported that wind farms took about ten years to develop, mainly because of delays in obtaining permits. On 25 August 2026, designated areas for faster permitting of wind and solar projects came into effect through a change to the national spatial plan. Outside the designated areas, developers can apply for permits under the standard procedure.

=== Municipal ownership ===
In 2003, Jindřichovice pod Smrkem put two wind turbines into operation. Both are owned by the municipality. Electricity sales help fund the village budget and a local environmental fund after operating costs and loan repayments are covered.

== See also ==
- Energy in the Czech Republic
- Solar power in the Czech Republic
- Renewable energy in the European Union
- Renewable energy by country
