= Costas Papacostas =

Cypriot politician

- Κώστας Παπακώστας

19th Minister of Defence
- In office 28 February 2008 – 14 July 2011
- Preceded by: Christodoulos Pasiardis
- Succeeded by: Demetris Eliades

Personal details
- Born: 12 November 1939 Ayia Trias, Cyprus
- Died: 21 September 2015 (aged 75) Nicosia, Cyprus
- Party: Progressive Party of Working People

Costas Papacostas (Greek: Κώστας Παπακώστας; 12 November 1939 – 21 September 2015) was the Cypriot Minister of Defence from 2008 to 2011. Following the Evangelos Florakis Naval Base explosion he resigned as Minister of Defence and was succeeded by Demetris Eliades, the Minister of Agriculture. In July 2013 he was found guilty of manslaughter, with the court saying he “closed his eyes to the danger” regarding the storage of explosives, for which he received a sentence of 5 years imprisonment.

Papacostas was born in Ayia Trias in Cyprus. From 1955 to 1959 he took part in the EOKA armed resistance against the British. In 1966 he joined the Cypriot National Guard and was twice seconded to the Cypriot police. Papacostas retired from the Army in 1984 having risen to the rank of colonel. He was elected to the House of Representatives representing Famagusta District for Progressive Party of Working People (AKEL) on 26 May 1996 and re-elected in 2001 and 2006.

== Death ==
Papacostas died on September 21, 2015, at the age of 75.

Political offices
Preceded by Christodoulos Pasiardis	Minister of Defence; 29 February 2008 - 14 July 2011	Succeeded by Demetris Eliades
