= List of Cyprus military bases =

List of military bases on the island of Cyprus

Military bases on the island of Cyprus:

- Andreas Papandreou AFB
- Evangelos Florakis Naval Base
- Camp Castle
- RAF Akrotiri
- Dhekelia Cantonment
