= Solar power in the European Union =

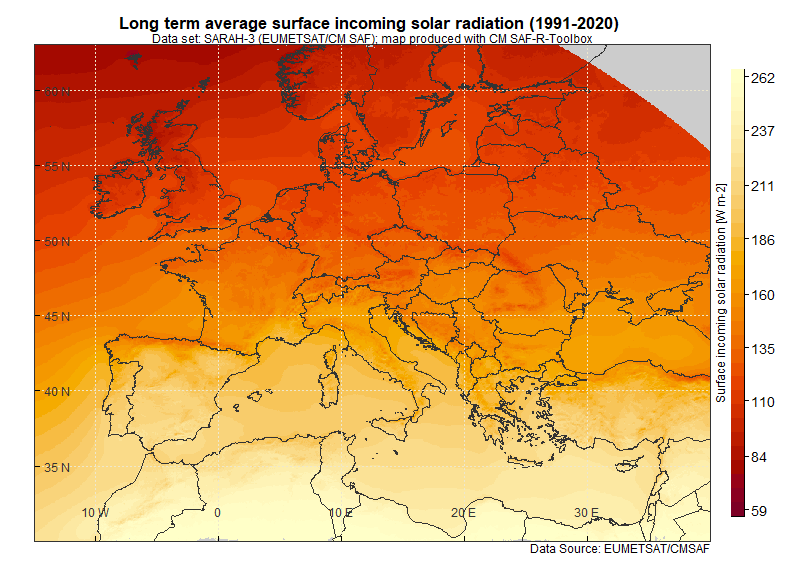
Solar potential in Europe and the Mediterranean. Data source: EUMETSAT CM SAF

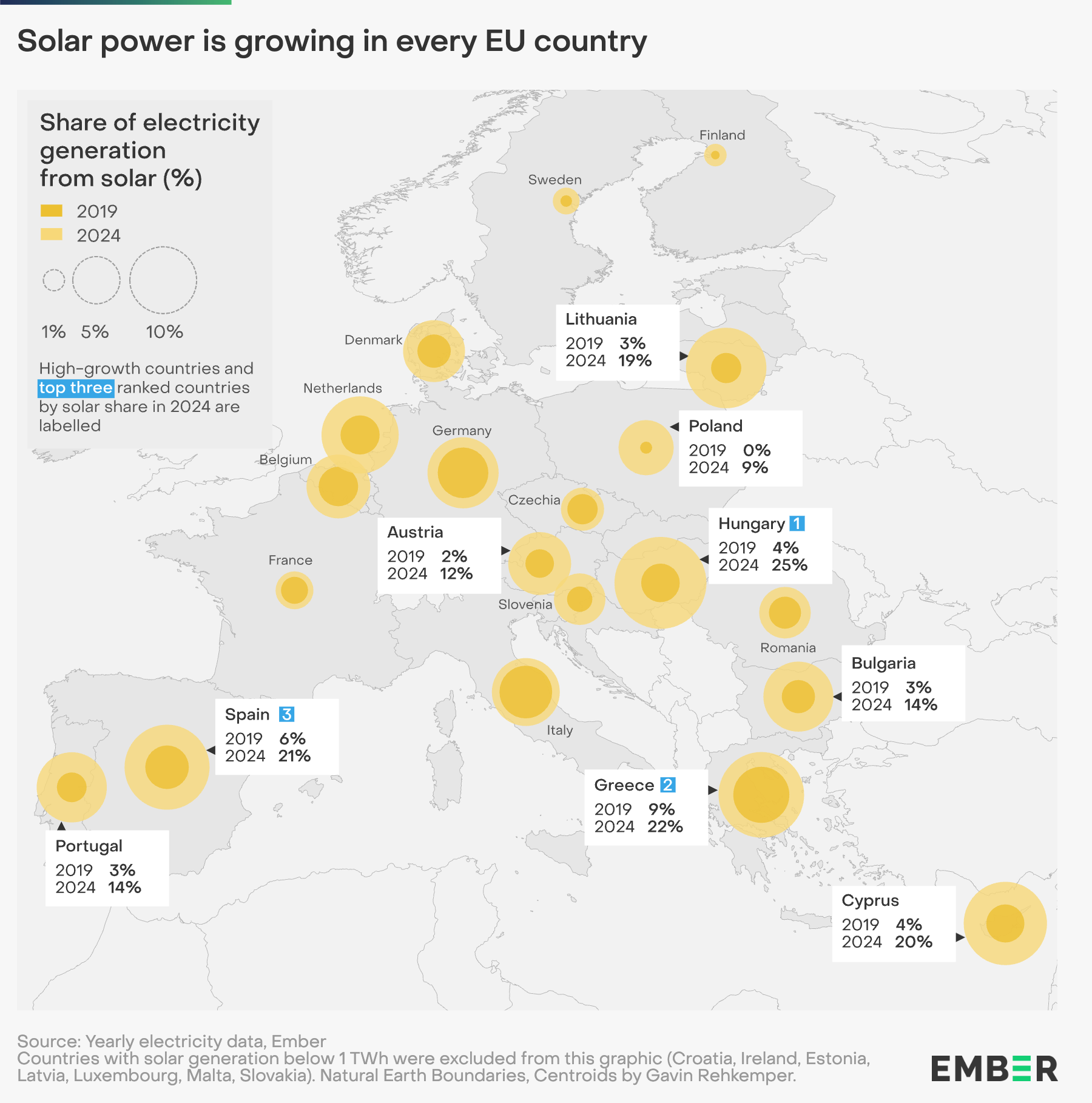
Solar power is growing in every EU country.

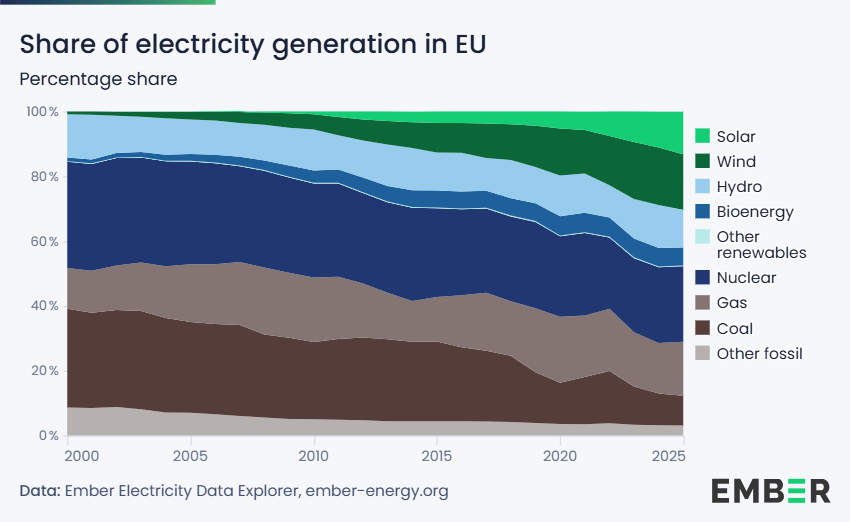
Electricity generation in the EU by source - percentage share

Solar power consists of photovoltaics (PV) and solar thermal energy in the European Union (EU). In 2010, the €2.6 billion European solar heating sectors consisted of small and medium-sized businesses, generated 17.3 terawatt-hours (TWh) of energy, employed 33,500 workers, and created one new job for every 80 kW of added capacity.

Solar energy, the fastest-growing energy source in the EU, saw an 82% cost reduction between 2010 and 2020. Solar capacity expanded from 164.19 GW in 2021 to an estimated 259.99 GW by 2023.

In 2022, four EU member states—Spain, Germany, Poland, and the Netherlands—ranked among the top 10 globally for additional solar capacity installed in the preceding year.

During 2023, an additional 55.9 gigawatts (GW) of photovoltaics systems were connected to the grid in the European Union, taking cumulative capacity to 263 GW. 2023 also saw a record high 9.1% of EU electricity generation coming from solar power.

== EU solar energy strategy ==
The EU's solar energy capacity increased significantly from 164.19 GW in 2021 to 259.99 GW by 2023, with employment in the sector growing from 466,000 workers in 2021 to 648,100 by the end of 2022, representing a 39% increase. These developments are part of the REPowerEU plan, which targets over 320 GW of solar photovoltaic capacity by 2025 and nearly 600 GW by 2030. The growth in jobs suggests the possibility of exceeding 1 million solar workers by 2025, ahead of previous estimates for 2030.

In support of its solar energy strategy, the EU has implemented three key initiatives. Firstly, the European Solar Rooftops Initiative aims to increase solar installations on buildings. Secondly, the EU Large-Scale Skills Partnership targets the skills gap in the renewable sector. Lastly, the EU Solar PV Industry Alliance focuses on enhancing solar manufacturing capacity within the EU.

Solar power is the fastest-growing renewable energy sources in the European Union, contributing significantly to electricity generation . In 2025, solar energy accounted for approximately 27.5% of total renewable electricity generation in the EU, highlighting its increasing importance alongside wind and hydro power.

The share of renewable energy in EU electricity generation reached around 47% in 2025, with solar playing a key role in this transition and continuing to expand due to supportive policies and declining costs.

== Photovoltaic solar power ==
PV growth in watts per capita from 1992 to 2014: <0.1, n/a 0.1-1 1-10 / 10-50 50-100 100-150 / 150-200 200-300 300-450

In 2012, photovoltaic systems with a total capacity of 17.2 gigawatt (GW) were connected to the grid in Europe, less than in 2011, when 22.4 GW had been installed. In terms of total installed capacity, according to EPIA's 2012-report, Europe still led the way with more than 70 GW, or 69% of worldwide capacity, producing 85 TWh of electricity annually. This energy volume is sufficient to power the supply needs of over 20 million households.

In 2011, solar photovoltaic continued its growth trend and Italy was the top market for the year, with 9.3 GW connected, followed by Germany (7.5 GW). These two markets were followed by France (1.7 GW) and the United Kingdom (784 MW). In terms of cumulative capacity, Germany with more than 24 GW, is the leading country in Europe, followed by Italy, with more than 12 GW. PV is now a significant part of Europe's electricity mix, producing 2% of the demand in the EU and roughly 4% of peak demand.

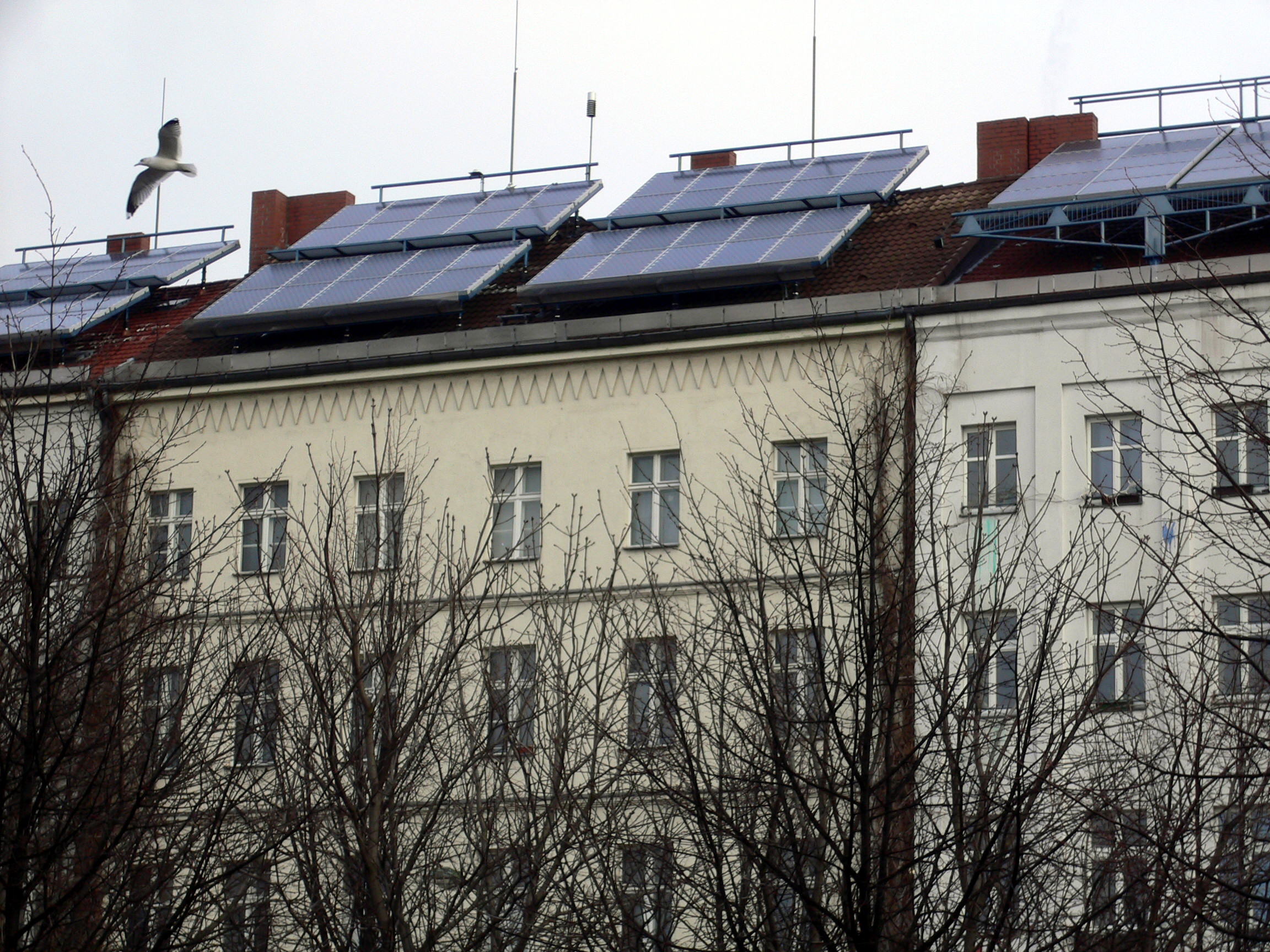
PV roof-top system in Berlin, Germany.

In 2011 the EU's solar electricity production is evaluated as ca 44.8 TWh in 2011 with 51.4 GW installed capacity, up 98% on 2010. In 2011 in the EU new installations were 21.5 GW. The solar power share in 2011 was around 3.6% in Italy, 3.1% in Germany and 2.6% in Spain. EuroObserver expects the total installation to reach at least 120 GW in 2020. The national strategies are equivalent to 84 GW solar capacity in 2020 which may underestimate the actual development taking place. For example, according to AGEE-Stat (the Ministry of Environment's Working Group on Renewable Energy Statistics), Germany connected solar capacity 7.5 GWp in 2011, twice the 3.5 GWp target. EU accounted for 74% of all newly connected capacity in 2011. According to Photon International magazine the worldwide solar cell production capacity was 12.5 GW in 2009 and 37 GW in 2011. In 2012, production capacities are set to rise to 69 GW, same as the total installed capacity worldwide at the end of 2011.

Denmark reached its governmental goal of achieving 200 MW of photovoltaic capacity by 2020 already in 2012, eight years in advance. At that time Danish energy sector players estimated that this development would result in 1000 MW by 2020. Croatia as the newest member of the EU has a less than enthusiastic embrace of solar power due to a number of reasons. However, in past few years, Croatian solar energy has seen a dramatic increase in the overall output. From 32.4 MWh in 2012, to an additional 46,2 MWh in 2013 with another 108 MWh awaiting to be connected to the national grid and additional power plants under construction with total energy output exceeding 200 MWh. Croatian national renewable energy strategy is to increase participating share of renewable in overall energy mix from current 15.8% (end of 2012) to around 25% by 2020 with solar generating at least 500 MWh.

Market development

Recent market analyses indicate that the European solar photovoltaic (PV) sector continues to expand rapidly, driven by declining technology costs, policy support, and increased investments in clean energy infrastructure. Solar photovoltaics accounted for approximately 11% of the European Union's gross electricity output in 2024, reflecting its growing role in the region's energy mix.

Industry and market reports suggest that the Europe solar PV market exceeded USD 60 billion in 2024 and is expected to grow steadily through 2030, supported by strong deployment across residential, commercial, and utility-scale segments in countries such as Germany, France, and Spain.

PV in the European Union (MW_{peak})
#	Country	2025	2024	2023	2022	2021	2020	2019	2018	2017	2016	2015	2014	2013	2012	2011	2010	2009
1	Germany	106,272	91,204	81,737	67,477	60,036	53,669	48,912	45,156	42,291	40,677	39,222	37,898	36,708	32,698	24,875	17,370	9,959
2	Spain	44,903	35,860	28,712	23,311	13,715	10,136	8,807	4,764	4,723	4,713	4,704	4,697	4,690	4,516	4,214	3,808	3,438
3	Italy	41,183	35,437	29,789	24,555	22,594	21,650	20,865	20,108	19,682	19,283	18,901	18,594	18,185	16,361	12,764	3,478	1,157
4	France	31,226	25,456	20,542	17,341	14,603	12,056	11,917	10,729	8,610	7,702	7,138	6,034	5,277	4,027	2,831	1,054	335
5	Netherlands	25,878	24,772	23,904	19,600	14,911	11,108	7,226	4,608	2,911	2,135	1,526	1,007	650	321	118	97	68
6	Poland	25,421	21,721	15,809	12,170	7,416	3,955	1,539	562	287	187	108	27	2	3.4	1.8	2	1
7	Greece	11,077	8,827	7,030	5,430	4,277	3,288	2,834	2,652	2,606	2,604	2,604	2,596	2,579	1,543	631	205	55
8	Belgium	10,398	9,642	8,549	6,756	6,012	5,573	4,637	4,000	3,621	3,329	3,132	3,015	2,902	2,649	1,812	787	574
9	Austria	10,304	8,904	6,832	3,792	2,783	2,043	1,702	1,455	1,269	1,096	937	785	626	421	173	103	53
10	Hungary	8,177	7 166	5,835	4,235	2,968	2,131	1,400	728	344	235	172	89	35	3.7	4.1	2	0.7
11	Portugal	6.949	5,811	3,876	2,646	1,646	1,100	901	667	579	513	477	415	296	228	143	131	102
12	Romania	6,237	4,257	1,917	1,809	1,394	1,383	1,398	1,386	1,374	1,372	1,326	1,293	761	49	2.9	2	0.6
13	Bulgaria	5,910	4,560	2,937	1,737	1,275	1,100	1,044	1,033	1,031	1,030	1,028	1,029	1,019	933	132	17	6
14	Sweden	5,500	4,848	3,488	2,388	1,606	1,107	714	428	244	153	104	60	43	23	18	10	9
15	Denmark	5,046	3,945	3,529	3,070	1,704	1,304	1,080	998	906	851	782	607	571	391	16	7	5
16	(Czech Republic) Czech	4,541	3,984	2,499	2,420	2,246	2,172	2,111	2,081	2,075	2,068	2,075	2,067	2,064	2,022	1,959	1,953	463
17	Lithuania	3,295	2,575	1,165	572	255	164	103	82	74	70	69	69	68	6.1	0.1	0.1	<0.1
18	Ireland	2,494	1,489	738	289	228	152	96	53	29	11	5	3	1	0.7	0.7	0.6	0.6
19	Slovenia	1,568	1,421	1,034	626	461	370	278	247	247	233	238	223	187	217	90	36	9
20	Finland	1,566	1,219	900	664	425	318	222	140	82	39	17	11	11	11	11	10	8
21	Croatia	1,319	902	461	222	138	109	85	68	60	56	48	33	19	20	16	16	12
22	Slovakia	1,028	728	631	549	537	535	490	472	528	533	533	533	533	517	488	144	0.2
23	Estonia	984	877	690	520	395	208	121	32	15	10	7	3	2	0.2	0.2	<0.1	<0.1
24	Latvia	922	660	353	113	7	5	3	2	1	1	1.5	1.5	1.5	1.5	1.5	<0.1	<0.1
25	Cyprus	861	751	606	424	315	229	151	118	110	84	76	64	35	17	10	6	3
26	Luxembourg	774	548	432	317	277	187	160	131	128	122	116	110	95	76	30	27	26
27	Malta	250	238	231	222	205	188	151	132	112	94	75	55	29	18	11	2	2
	United Kingdom	21,662	19,000	16,800	-	-	-	13,224	13,059	12,760	11,914	9,601	5,528	2,937	1,657	1,014	75	30
(European Union) EU-28/27 (GW_{p})		364.74	308.43	248.79	194.31	161.83	135.10	131.02	114.81	106.69	101.11	95.02	86.85	80.33	68.64	51.36	29.33	15.86

PV in watts per capita
#	Country	2022	2021	2020	2019	2018	2017	2016	2015	2014	2013	2012	2011
1	Netherlands	1081.5	815.4	636.9	400.6	250.3	160.9	120.1	83.1	65.4	39.6	19.1	7.1
2	Germany	794.2	706.2	645.4	590.4	546.9	512.0	503.1	489.8	474.1	447.2	399.5	304.3
3	Belgium	590.3	544.7	483.0	395.5	373.2	338.4	302.8	286.7	277.2	267.3	240.0	165.5
4	Greece	532.9	371.0	307.3	260.5	246.9	242.2	241.4	241.7	236.8	233.7	136.7	55.8
5	Cyprus	508.4	352.7	256.7	146.9	130.9	123.1	64.7	82.0	75.5	40.2	19.9	12.5
6	Luxembourg	488.4	435.3	296.6	229.0	222.6	215.0	212.8	222.0	200.1	186.2	89.9	59.9
7	Italy	425.5	373.1	364.2	345.7	332.4	325.0	317.7	311.3	303.5	295.1	269.0	210.5
8	Denmark	421.8	273.5	223.6	186.0	173.3	158.3	150.4	138.3	106.9	94.8	70.2	3.0
9	Estonia	396.6	311.3	156.4	80.8	0.0	0.0	7.7	3.1	0.1	0.1	0.1	0.1
10	Austria	392.4	314.5	229.1	187.5	162.4	142.3	123.9	108.9	90.6	81.7	49.9	20.7
11	Malta	387.9	369.9	364.8	305.1	276.0	247.9	188.8	170.5	127.5	58.7	45.0	27.4
12	Spain	381.2	276.5	214.0	196.7	101.8	109.8	103.4	106.0	102.9	100.7	97.8	91.3
13	Hungary	309.9	219.0	218.6	130.7	77.1	37.6	29.3	14.0	3.9	1.6	0.4	0.4
14	Poland	303.3	202.7	104.4	34.7	12.8	7.1	5.2	2.03	0.6	0.1	0.1	0.0
15	Bulgaria	301.3	171.5	158.6	152.1	146.9	144.8	144.3	141.7	140.8	139.9	127.4	17.7
16	Slovenia	299.2	174.0	176.0	106.7	123.9	124.9	125.5	124.8	124.2	123.8	105.7	44.1
17	France	256.1	218.5	178.4	157.9	141.4	120.5	107.3	99.1	87.6	71.6	61.6	43.5
18	Sweden	248.5	154.6	106.9	68.2	41.9	23.1	15.6	13.3	8.2	4.5	2.5	2.0
19	(Czech Republic) Czech	246.2	198.0	203.0	197.2	193.0	192.9	194.0	197.7	196.1	196.1	192.5	186.0
20	Portugal	243.6	160.0	106.8	88.3	65.2	55.2	45.4	44.3	40.2	26.8	21.7	13.5
21	Lithuania	200.6	91.2	58.7	29.7	26.3	28.8	27.7	25.0	23.2	22.9	2.0	0.0
22	Finland	106.4	73.0	57.5	39.0	22.7	11.1	3.6	2.7	1.9	2.1	2.1	2.1
23	Slovakia	98.9	98.0	98.0	86.6	97.6	98.1	100.5	109.0	109.0	99.3	95.7	89.8
24	Romania	74.2	72.8	71.8	71.4	70.5	70.0	69.4	66.7	64.8	51.1	0.3	0.1
25	Croatia	47.2	26.9	26.9	16.9	14.9	12.4	12.0	10.6	8.1	5.1	0.1	0.1
26	Latvia	29.8	4.2	2.6	1.6	0.5	0.7	0.8	0.8	0.8	0.7	0.7	0.7
27	Ireland	26.3	27.2	18.1	7.3	6.0	1.9	1.1	0.5	0.2	0.2	0.2	0.2
	United Kingdom	288.2	-	-	204.3	197.0	193.9	176.8	137.7	81.3	42.9	26.3	16.2
–	(European Union) EU	466.5	354.2	334.5	254.5	223.6	208.3	197.8	186.1	171.5	155.8	136.3	102.2

== Concentrated solar power ==
Solar power, the production of electricity from solar energy, is performed either directly, through photovoltaics, or indirectly, using concentrated solar power (CSP). One advantage that CSP has is the ability to add thermal storage and provide power up to 24 hours a day. Gemasolar, in Spain, was the first to provide 24-hour power. There is considerable academic and commercial interest internationally in a new form of CSP, called STEM, for off-grid applications to produce 24-hour industrial scale power for mining sites and remote communities in Italy, other parts of Europe, Australia, Asia, North Africa and Latin America. STEM uses fluidised silica sand as a thermal storage and heat transfer medium for CSP systems. It has been developed by Salerno-based Magaldi Industries. The first commercial application of STEM will take place in Sicily from 2015.

CSP in Europe (MW_{peak})
#	Country	2007	2008	2009	2010	2011	2012	2013
1	Spain	10.00	60.00	281.40	531.40	1,151.40	1,953.90	2,303.90
2	Italy	0	0	0	5.00	5.00	5.00	5.35
3	Germany	0	0	0	1.50	1.50	1.50	1.50
4	France	0	0	0	0.50	0.75	0.75	0.75
(European Union) EU		10	60	281	738	1,159	1,961	2,311

== Solar thermal ==
Over the next 10 years the European solar thermal will grow on average at a rate of 15% per annum. According to the National Renewable Energy Action Plans the total solar thermal capacity in the EU will be 102 GW in 2020 (while 14 GW in 2006).

In June 2009, the European Parliament and Council adopted the Directive on the promotion of the use of energy from Renewable Energy Sources (RES). For the first time, heating and cooling accounting for half of the final energy demand will be covered by a European directive promoting renewable energies. The overall renewable target is legally binding but renewable mix is free. According to the delivered national plans the highest of solar heating markets during 2010-2020 will be in Italy, Germany, France, Spain, and Poland in respect to the national target in 2020 and capacity increase. Top countries per capita will be Cyprus, Greece, Austria, Italy, and Belgium.

In some European countries the solar thermal market is still in its infancy. Bulgaria, Denmark, the Netherlands, Sweden, and the United Kingdom have extremely low targets in their plans. Estonia, Finland, Latvia, and Romania have not included solar thermal in their national plans at all.

Solar heating is the usage of solar energy to provide space or water heating. Worldwide the use was 88 GW_{thermal} in 2005. Growth potential is enormous. The EU have been second after China in the installations. If all EU countries had used solar thermal as enthusiastically as the Austrians, the EU's installed capacity would have been 91 GWth (130 million m^{2}), far beyond the target of 100 million m^{2} by 2010, set by the white paper in 1997. In 2005 solar heating in the EU was equivalent to more than 686,000 tons of oil. ESTIF's minimum target is to produce solar heating equivalent to 5,600,000 tons of oil (2020). A more ambitious, but feasible, target is 73 million tons of oil per year (2020) – a lorry row spanning 1,5 times around the globe.

Solar heating in the European Union (MW_{thermal})
#	Country	2008	2009	2010	2011	2012	2013
1	Germany	7,766	9,036	9,831	10,496	11,416	12,055
2	Austria	2,268	3,031	3,227	2,792	3,448	3,538
3	Greece	2,708	2,853	2,855	2,861	2,885	2,915
4	Italy	1,124	1,410	1,753	2,152	2,380	2,590
5	Spain	988	1,306	1,543	1,659	2,075	2,238
6	France	1,137	1,287	1,470	1,277	1,691	1,802
7	Poland	254	357	459	637	848	1,040
8	Portugal	223	395	526	547	677	717
9	Czech Republic	116	148	216	265	625	681
10	Netherlands	254	285	313	332	605	616
11	Denmark	293	339	379	409	499	550
12	Cyprus	485	490	491	499	486	476
13	United Kingdom	270	333	374	460	455	475
14	Sweden	202	217	227	236	337	342
15	Belgium	188	204	230	226	334	374
16	Ireland	52	85	106	111	177	196
17	Slovenia	96	111	116	123	142	148
18	Hungary	18	59	105	120	125	137
19	Romania	66	80	73	74	93	110
20	Slovakia	67	73	84	100	108	113
21	Croatia					84	98
22	Bulgaria	22	56	74	81	58	59
23	Malta	25	29	32	36	34	35
24	Finland	18	20	23	23	30	33
25	Luxembourg	16	19	22	25	23	27
26	Latvia	1	1	1	3	10	12
27	Lithuania	1	2	2	3	6	8
28	Estonia	1	2	2	3	4	6
(European Union) EU (in GW)		19.08	21.60	23.49	25.55	29.66	31.39
Notes: The relation between collector area and rated power: 1m^{2} = 0.7 kW_{thermal}; Data source for 2013: Divergent figures from different reports. Total of 31.39 GW_{th} corresponds to figures from EurObserv'ER report, while report from the European Solar Thermal Industry Federation (ESTIF) accounts for 30.2 GW_{th} and includes capacity from non-EU member Switzerland.; Data sources of previous years: 2012 not sourced – 2011 – 2010 – 2009 – 2008; For historical data from 2004 to 2010 see collapsed table below

Solar heating in watts per capita
#	Country	2011	2013
1	Cyprus	609	551
2	Austria	397	419
3	Greece	253	263
4	Germany	130	150
5	Malta	80	83
6	Denmark	78	108
7	Slovenia	65	72
8	Portugal	58	68
9	Czech Republic	53	65
10	Spain	41	48
11	Luxembourg	37	51
12	Sweden	35	36
12	Netherlands	35	37
14	Italy	34	43
15	Ireland	27	43
15	Belgium	27	34
17	France	25	27
18	Slovakia	19	21
19	Poland	17	27
20	Bulgaria	11	8
21	Hungary	9	14
22	United Kingdom	7	7
23	Finland	5	6
24	Romania	4	6
24	Latvia	4	6
26	Estonia	1	4
27	Lithuania	1	3
28	Croatia	n.a.	23
	(European Union) EU average	55	62

Solar heating – Historical data in kW_{th} from 2004 to 2010
Country	Total (2010)	Total (2009)	Total (2008)	add 2006	add 2005	add 2004
Germany	9,676,800	8,896,300	7,765,800	1,050,000	665 000	525 000
Greece	2,858,940	2,851,940	2,707,740	168 000	154 350	150 500
Austria	2,685,556	2,517,812	2,268,231	204 868	163 429	127 816
Italy	1,870,211	1,404,361	1,124,361	130 200	88 941	68 417
Spain	1,474,806	1,261,516	987,816	122 500	74 760	63 000
France	1,101,730	1,371,370	1,136,870	154 000	85 050	36 400
Cyprus	500,515	514,640	485,240	42 000	35 000	21 000
Portugal	470,888	345,338	223,265	14 000	11 200	7 000
Poland	459,123	356,902	255,973	28 980	19 390	20 230
United Kingdom	401,254	332,514	270,144	37 800	19 600	17 500
Denmark	367,602	330,946	292,796	17 710	14 875	14 000
Netherlands	313,317	285,139	254,339	10 280	14 174	18 410
Belgium	229,703	203,593	188,263	24 945	14 164	10 290
Sweden	226,615	217,362	202,445	19 977	15 835	14 041
Czech Republic	215,863	147,854	115,570	15 421	10 885	8 575
Slovenia	122,710	111,510	96,110	4 830	3 360	1 260
Hungary	104,870	57,813	17,675	700	700	1 050
Ireland	92,042	75,432	52,080	3 500	2 450	1 400
Slovakia	85,225	76,125	66,675	5 950	5 250	3 850
Bulgaria	73,710	89,530	22,120	1,540	1,400	1,260
Romania	73,290	80,010	66,010	280	280	280
Malta	32,102	28,602	24,752	3,150	2,800	2,951
Finland	23,046	18,881	17,705	2,380	1,668	1,141
Luxembourg	22,120	19,040	15,750	1,750	1,330	1,190
Estonia	2,044	1,694	1,379	210	175	175
Latvia	1,358	1,218	5,005	840	700	350
Lithuania	1,680	1,540	3,003	420	350	350
EU27+CH; GW_{th}	24.11	22.14	19.08	2.10	1.43	1.14
* = The relation between collector area and capacity: m^{2} = 0.7 kW_{thermal} Source:

== Organisations ==
- SolarPower Europe is a member-led association representing organisations active along the whole value chain that aim's to ensure that more energy is generated by solar than any other energy source by 2030 and to lead their members to make solar the core of a smart, sustainable, secure and inclusive energy system to reach carbon neutrality before 2050.
- The European Solar Manufacturing Council is an industry association that represents European solar photovoltaics (PV) manufacturers, research and development organizations, and companies engaged in the upstream PV industry in Europe. ESMC's primary objective is to promote the PV manufacturing industry and its associated value chains at the European level by fostering a supporting political environment.

== See also ==
- Desertec
- Dye-sensitized solar cell
- European countries by fossil fuel use (% of total energy)
- Photovoltaic Energy Development and Research Institute
- Renewable energy in the European Union
- Solar cell efficiency
- Solar power by country
