= Ormideia =

Ormideia Ορμήδεια
- Location in Cyprus
- Coordinates: 34°59′33″N 33°46′49″E
- Country: Cyprus
- District: Larnaca District

Population (2011)
  - Total: 4,189
- Time zone: UTC+2 (EET)
  - Summer (DST): UTC+3 (EEST)

Ormideia (Greek: Ορμήδεια, pronounced [orˈmiðja], locally [oˈrmiθca]), sometimes also spelled Ormidhia, is a village in Larnaca District in south-eastern Cyprus. It is one of the four exclaves surrounded by the Eastern Sovereign Base Area of Akrotiri and Dhekelia, a British Overseas Territory administered as a Sovereign Base Area. The others are the village of Xylotymbou and two separate parts of Dhekelia Power Station. It is administered by the Republic of Cyprus. Its population in 2011 was 4,189.

Archaeological objects found in the village are displayed at various museums. A stele with the "syllabic funerary inscription Panroses" is on display at the Larnaca District Archaeological Museum.
