= Solar power in Estonia =

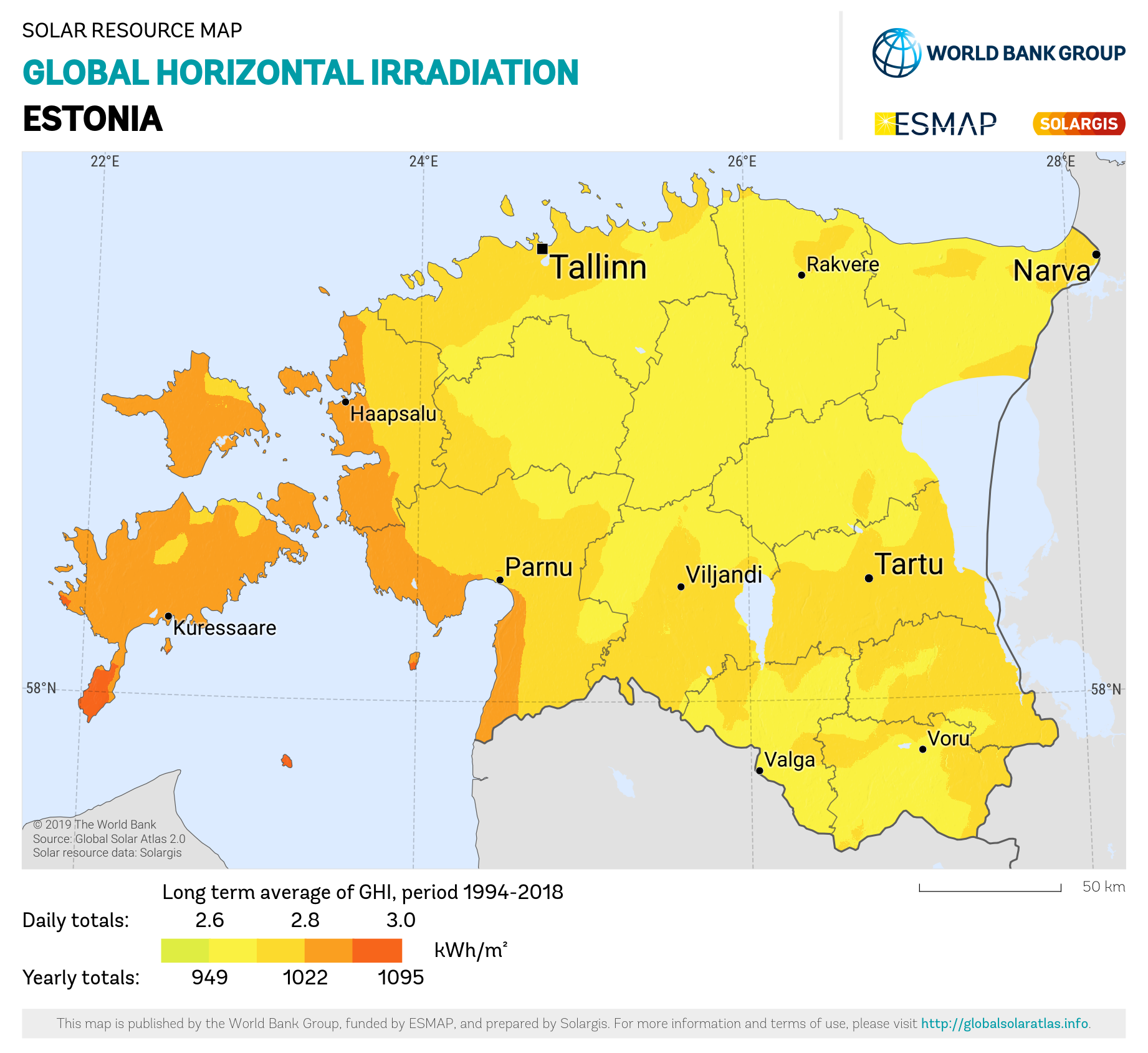
Solar potential in Estonia

Solar power in Estonia is a growing source of energy, particularly since 2020.

The Estonian Chamber of Renewable Energy estimates cumulative solar PV capacity in the Baltic nation reached 1.4 GW at the end of 2025.

Solar power accounted for 18.5% of Estonia's electricity generation in 2025, up from less than 0.1% in 2015.

== See also ==
- Renewable energy in Estonia
- Solar power by country
- Solar power in the European Union
