= Xylotymbou =

Xylotymbou Ξυλοτύμπου
- Location in Cyprus
- Coordinates: 35°01′N 33°45′E
- Country: Cyprus
- District: Larnaca District

Government
  - Type: Community
  - Council president: Sotiris Kekkouris

Population (2021)
  - Total: 3,783
- Time zone: UTC+2 (EET)
  - Summer (DST): UTC+3 (EEST)
- Postal code: 7510

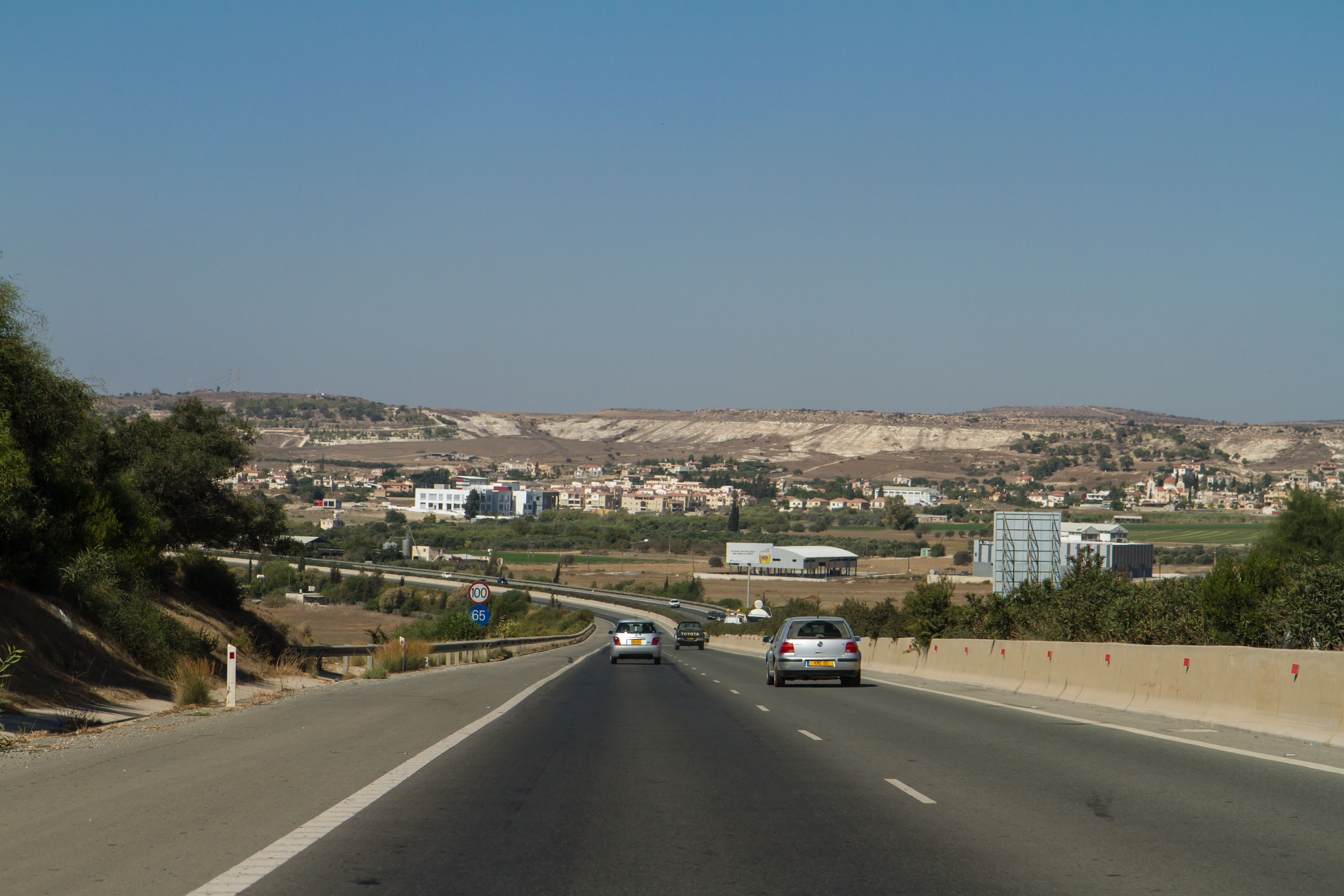
A3 near Xylotymvou, Overlooking Pyla, Cyprus

Xylotymbou (Greek: Ξυλοτύμπου [locally [ksiloˈtimbu]] or Ξυλοτύμβου) is a small town in Larnaca District in south-eastern Cyprus. It is one of the four enclaves surrounded by the Eastern Sovereign Base Area of Akrotiri and Dhekelia, a British Overseas Territory, administered as a Sovereign Base Area. The others are the village of Ormidhia and two separate parts of Dhekelia Power Station. It is administered by the internationally recognized government of Cyprus, the Republic of Cyprus.

Until 1917, Xylotymbou belonged administratively to Famagusta District and since then it belongs in Larnaca District. It is located in the middle of Makrasyka, Achna, Ormidia, Dhekelia, Pyla, and Pergamos. It is a new village. Until 1821, there were no residents. The Hadjiyiorkis was one of the first inhabitants of the village. When he was married in 1840, the village had only seven houses.

The village may have been inhabited during the Byzantine period. The ancient caves of pre-Christian era, the churches and the smallest, old church of Agios Andronikos from the Byzantine period were built in the same place where the new church of Agios Andronikos and Athanasia was later built.

During the Venetian occupation in the medieval period, the village, along with Ormideia, Panayia of Traseias, Augorou, Xylofagou, Liopetri, Agia Napa, and Pyla Cape were the thrones of a kingdom that was destroyed by an earthquake and pillaging barbarian invaders. The tower in Xylofagou was an observatory of the time for detection of corsairs conquerors.

In the Great Cyprus Encyclopaedia, Costas Christofides says that the antiquities smuggler Luigi Palma di Cesnola (1865–1876), and American consul in Cyprus, discovered a carved wooden grave with wonderful carving representations of Aphrodite and Artemis in 1882 (hence, the name Xylotymbou, literally meaning 'wooden tomb'). The elders of the village said that the place where the tomb was, is where Agios Andronikos and Athanasia church was built between 1890-1900, and where the builders took and used the stones from the grave.

Residents of Xylotymbou are engaged in agriculture and trade. Many residents work in the British Sovereign Base in Dhekelia and in the tourism industry in Ayia Napa, Protaras, and Larnaca.

Xylotymbou is famous for its many small churches/chapels (about 10) and, in particular, the majestic monastery of St Raphael, Nicholas, and Irene.

In 2006 two cooperating clubs (Laikes Organosis Xylotymbou and Kimon Xylotymbou) founded a united football team, the P.O. Xylotymbou.
