= Vasilikos Power Station =

Power station in Cyprus

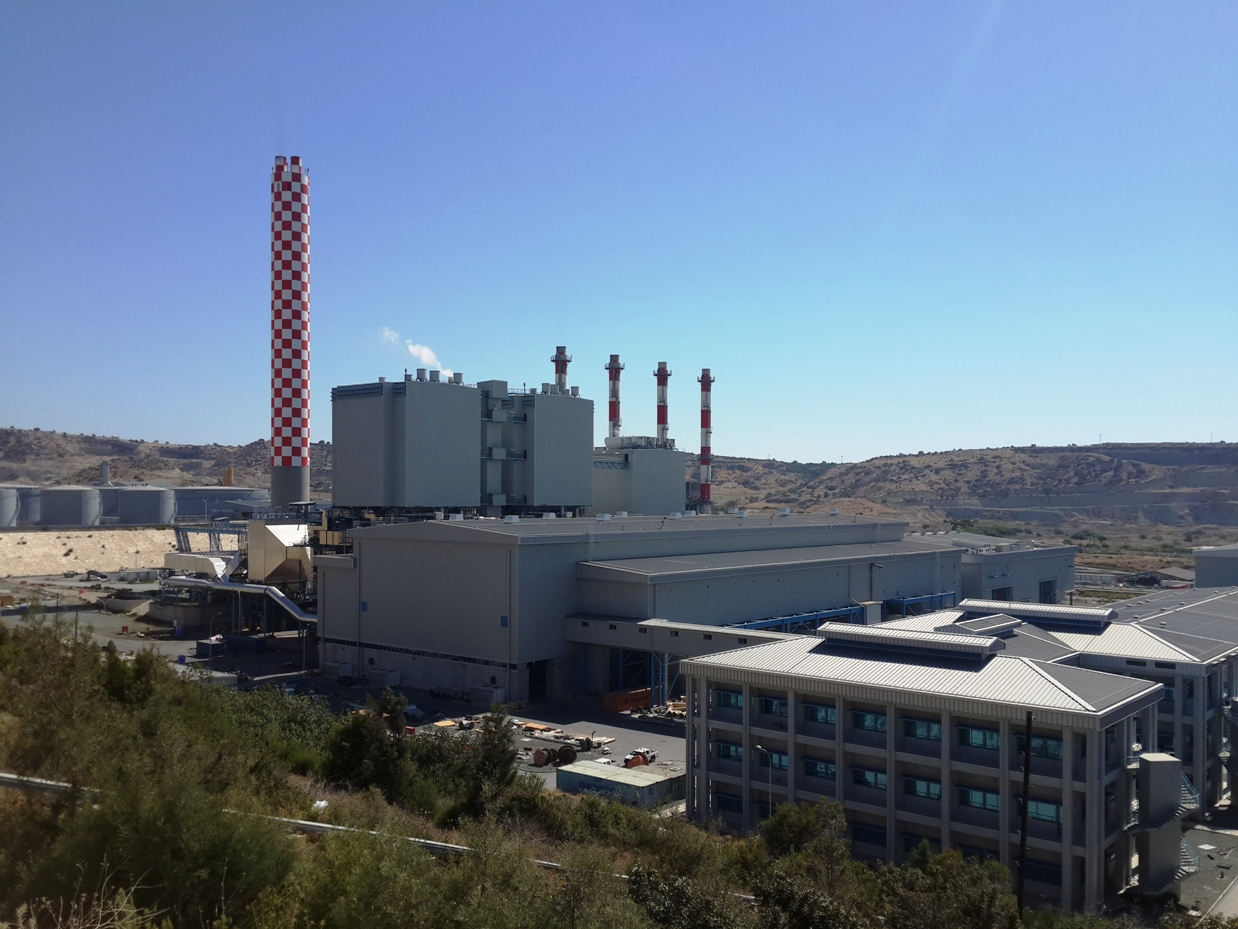
- Vasilikos Power Station in 2013
- Official name: Σταθμός Βασιλικού
- Country: Cyprus
- Coordinates: 34°43′43″N 33°17′24″E
- Owner: Electricity Authority of Cyprus
- Operator: Electricity Authority of Cyprus

Thermal power station
- Primary fuel: Heavy fuel oil / natural gas
- Secondary fuel: Coal / diesel oil

Power generation
- Units operational: 1×35MW gas turbine 2×125MW steam turbines 1×130MW steam turbine 2×220MW combined cycle
- Make and model: ABB; GE
- Nameplate capacity: 855 MW

The Vasilikos Power Station is the newest power plant of Electricity Authority of Cyprus. Located between Larnaca and Limassol and with an installed capacity of 640 MW, it was still under development prior to the Evangelos Florakis Naval Base explosion of 11 July 2011.

The first phase came online in the early 2000s and consists of two ABB steam turbogenerators each with a capacity of 125 MW and a gas turbine at 35 MW. Steam is produced in heavy fuel oil-fired boilers made by Austrian Energy and Environment. The boilers design allowed conversion to coal firing because they were planned only a few years after the first Gulf War that created fears of oil shortages, but eventually this option was not exercised.

The second phase consists of a single steam turbogenerator at 130 MW that came online in 2005. The boiler for this was supplied by Ansaldo and also burns heavy fuel oil. This was not convertible to coal burning and so it was physically smaller than the other two units.

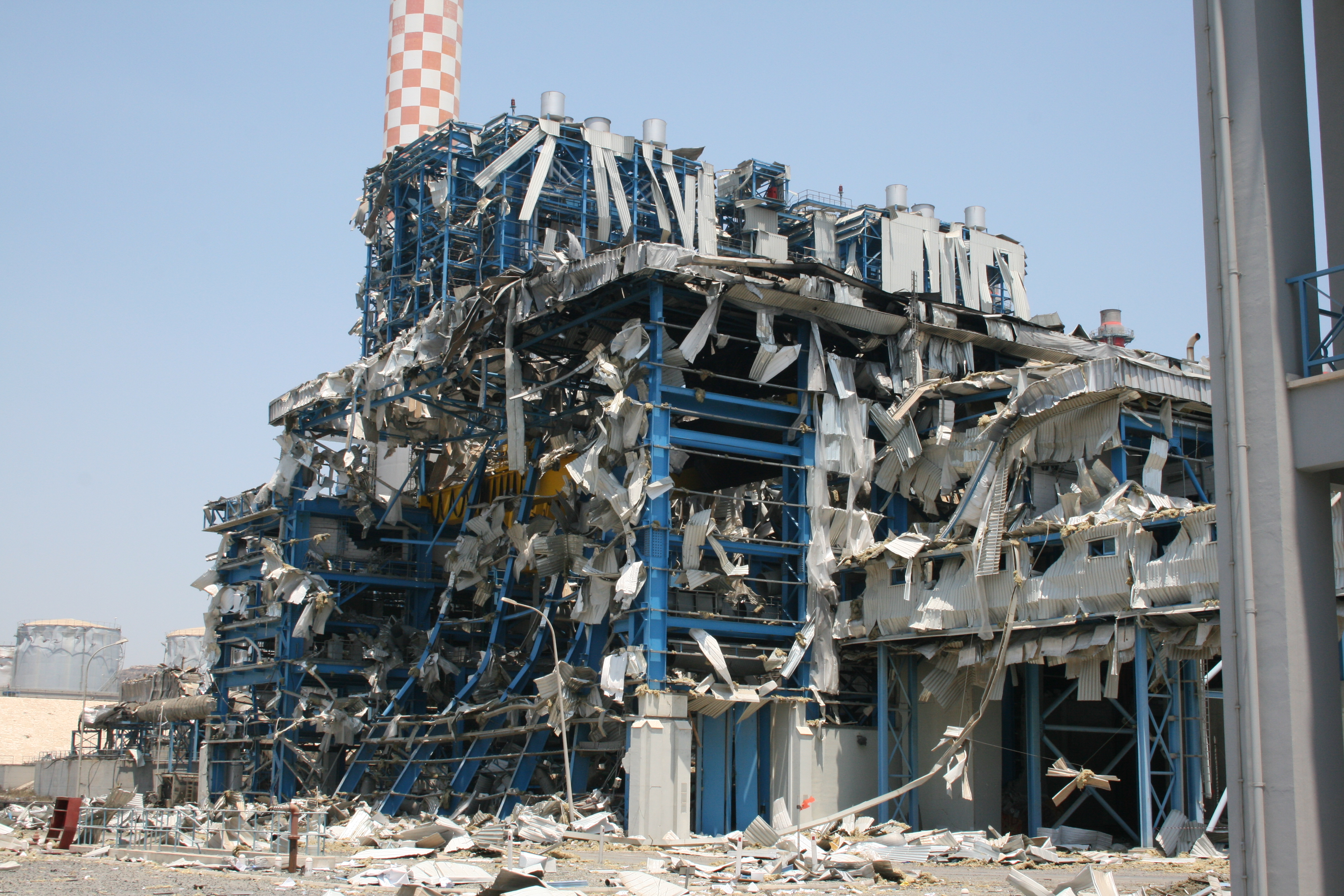
The power station, two days after the Evangelos Florakis Naval Base explosion

The Authority decided on the use of combined cycle technology for the fourth unit of the plant. It consists of two gas turbines by General Electric combined with one steam turbogenerator. The capacity of this unit reaches 220 MW. The unit came online using diesel fuel as a stopgap until a gas terminal is built in Cyprus. A fifth unit, identical to the fourth one was under construction and the tests of the gas turbines were completed prior to the July 2011 explosion at the adjacent naval base.

The flue gas stack of the power station is 138 metres (453 ft) high and is the second tallest structure in Cyprus.

The explosion that severely damaged the power station was heard up to 50 kilometres (31 mi) away and is believed to have involved at least 2,000 tonnes of munitions. With the exception of the gas turbine, all other generators were damaged and remained offline for more than one year.

== See also ==
- Energy in Cyprus
- Evangelos Florakis Naval Base explosion
