= Solar power in the Czech Republic =

Solar power in Czech Republic
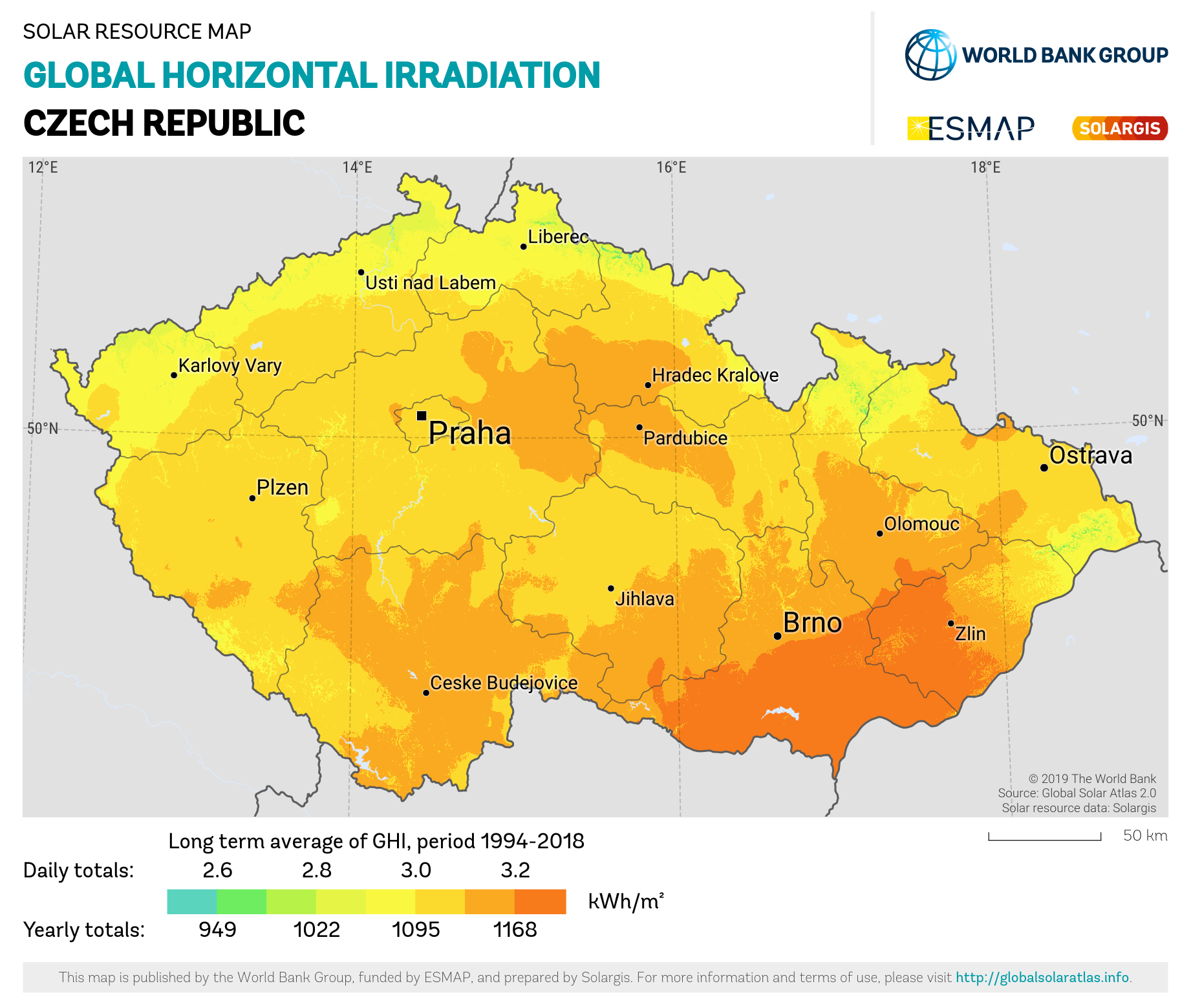
- Solar irradiation map of Czech Republic
- Installed capacity: 5.5 GW (2025) (37)
- Annual generation: 4.4 TWh (2025)
- Capacity per capita: 504 W (2025)
- Share of electricity: 14.7% (2025)

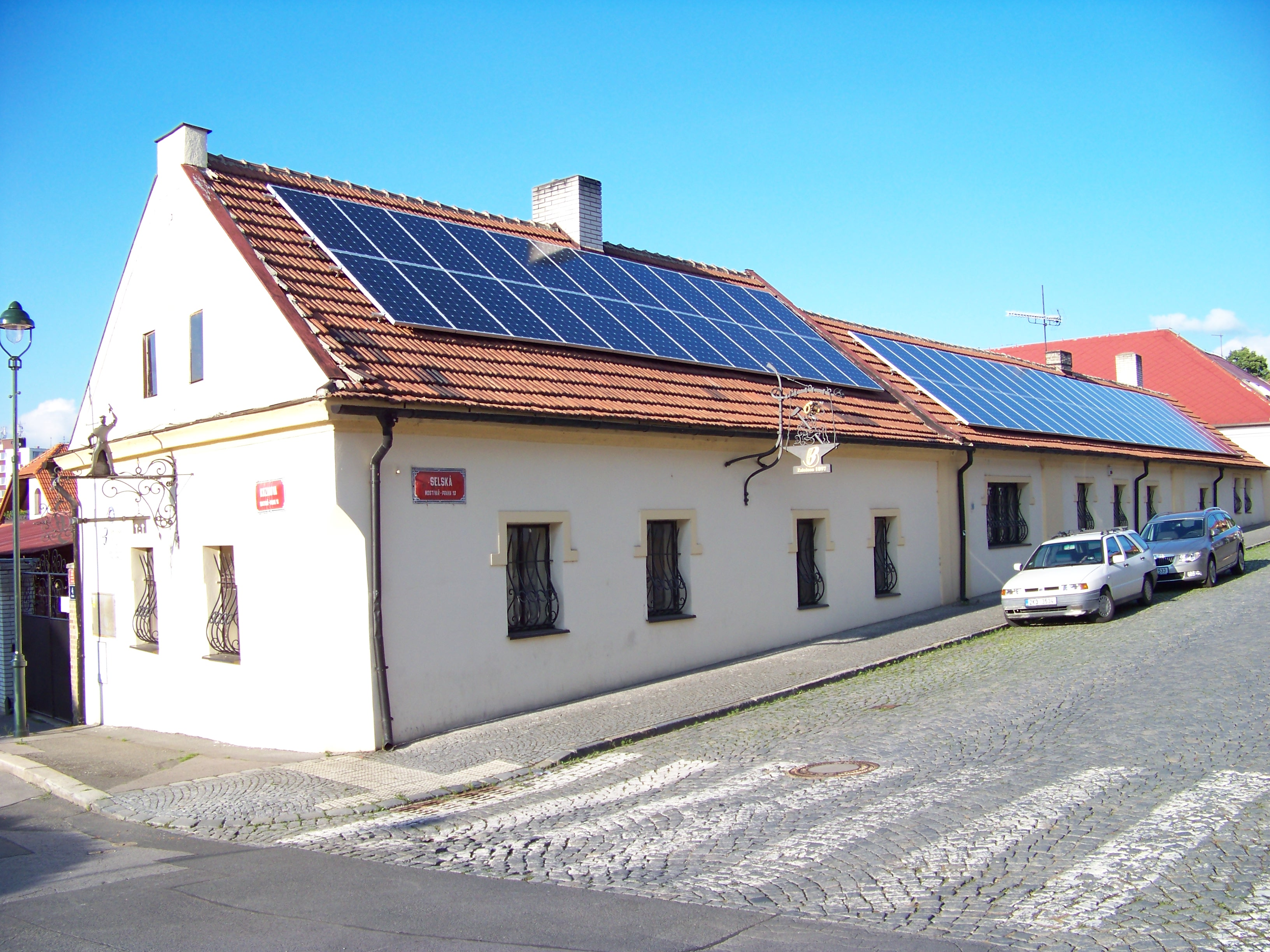
Solar panels in Prague

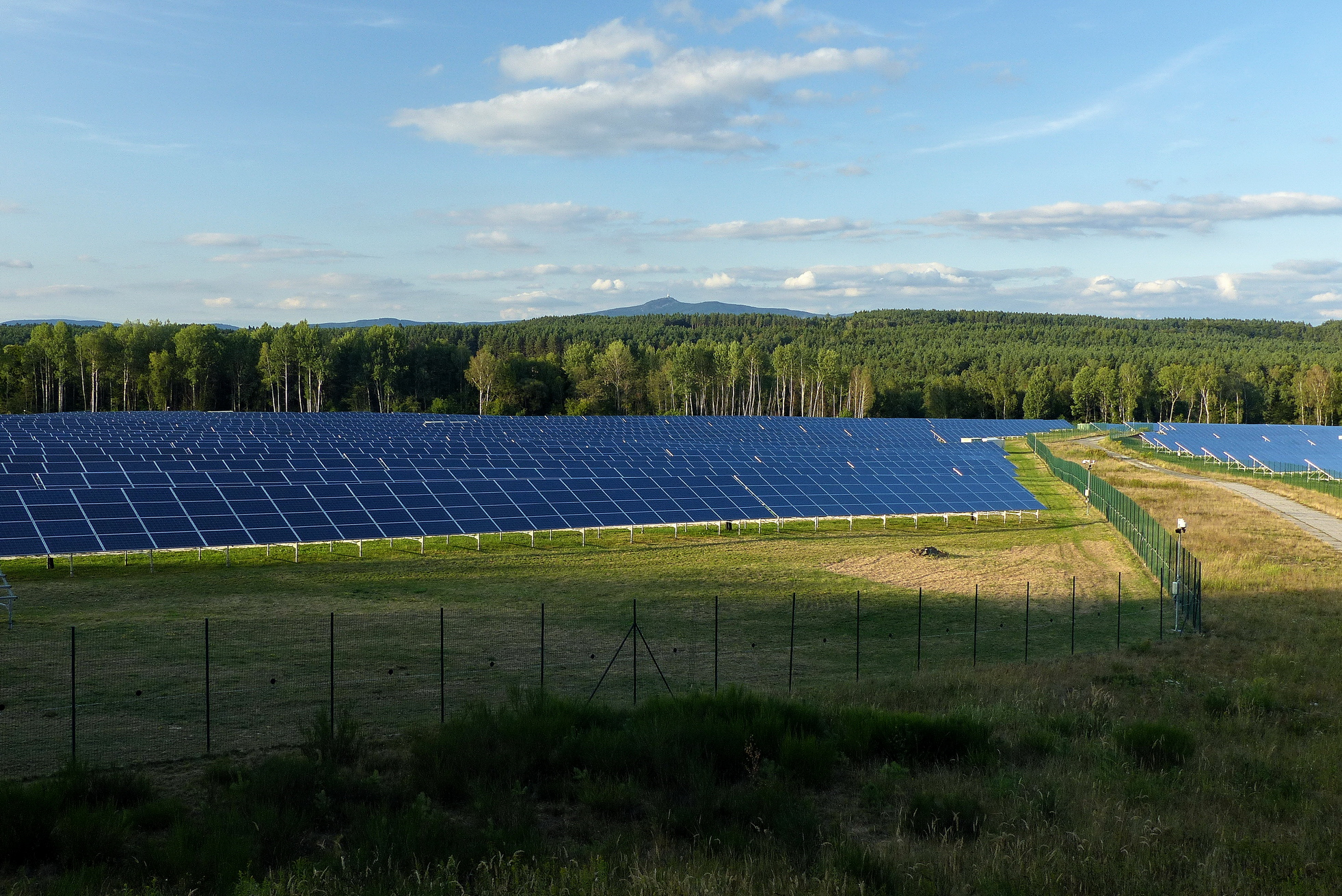
Ralsko Solar Park, the largest solar power plant in the Czech Republic

As of 2025, solar power in the Czech Republic represented 14.7% of the total energy share, with an installed capacity of 5.5 GW and a generation of 4.4 TWh at the end of the year. The country experienced a 12-year absence from new photovoltaic installations between 2011 and 2023 due to anti-PV campaigns that led to the feed-in tariff being reduced by 25%. While it had almost two gigawatts (GW) of capacity at the end of 2010, of which almost 1,500 MW installed in the same year, it added less than 10 MW in 2011 and 109 MW in 2012. In 2014, no new installations were reported.

Photovoltaics installed
Year	Installed	Total (MW_{p})	Generation (GWh)	Source
2006	0.313	0.843		
2007	3.118	3.961		
2008	51	54.674		
2009	411.2	465.9	88.8	
2010	1,495.8	1,959.1	615.7	
2011	0	1,913.4	2,182.0	
2012	109.0	2,022.4	2,149.0	
2013	110.4	2,132.4	2,070.0	
2014	-82	2,050	2,121.7	
2015	20	2,070	2,238	
2016	-40	2,030	2,134	
2017	10	2,040	2,152	
2018	10	2,050	2,331	
2019	10	2,060	2,262	
2020	-10	2,050	2,160	
2021	0	2,050	2,185	
2022	30	2,080	2,368	
2023	1,460	3,550	2,780	
2024	870	4,420	3,905	
2025	920	5,330	4,708	

Source: Photovoltaic Barometer: Energy-Charts.info, Fraunhofer Institute for Solar Energy Systems

Photovoltaic power stations
Photovoltaic power station	Region	Site co-ordinates	Nominal power (MW_{p})	Production (annual GW·h)	Notes
Ralsko Solar Park	Liberec	50°37′N 14°48′E	38.3		Completed December 2010
Vepřek Solar Park	Central Bohemian	50°18′N 14°19′E	35.1		186,960 modules, completed September 2010
Ševětín Solar Park	South Bohemian	49°11′N 14°36′E	29.902		Completed December 2010
Bežerovice	South Bohemian		3.013		
Buštěhrad	Central Bohemian		2.396		
Čekanice	South Bohemian		4.48		
Dukovany	Vysočina		0.01		
Hrušovany	South Moravia		3.73	3.7	
Chýnov	South Bohemian		2.009		
Mimoň	Ústí		17.494		
Pánov	South Moravia		2.134		
Přelouč	Pardubice		0.0208		
Vranovská Ves	South Moravia		16.033		
Žabčice	South Moravia		5.6		

In 2003 a Czech-Austrian information and training center for solar power was founded in the village of Věžovatá Pláně in South Bohemia. That same year Major Josef Mach claimed that the electricity from the Temelín nuclear power plant in the Czech Republic would be abandoned. He is known as one of the biggest Temelín opponents in the Czech Republic.

== See also ==
- Renewable energy in the Czech Republic
- Energy in the Czech Republic
- List of renewable energy topics by country
- Solar power in the European Union
