= Solar power in Cyprus =

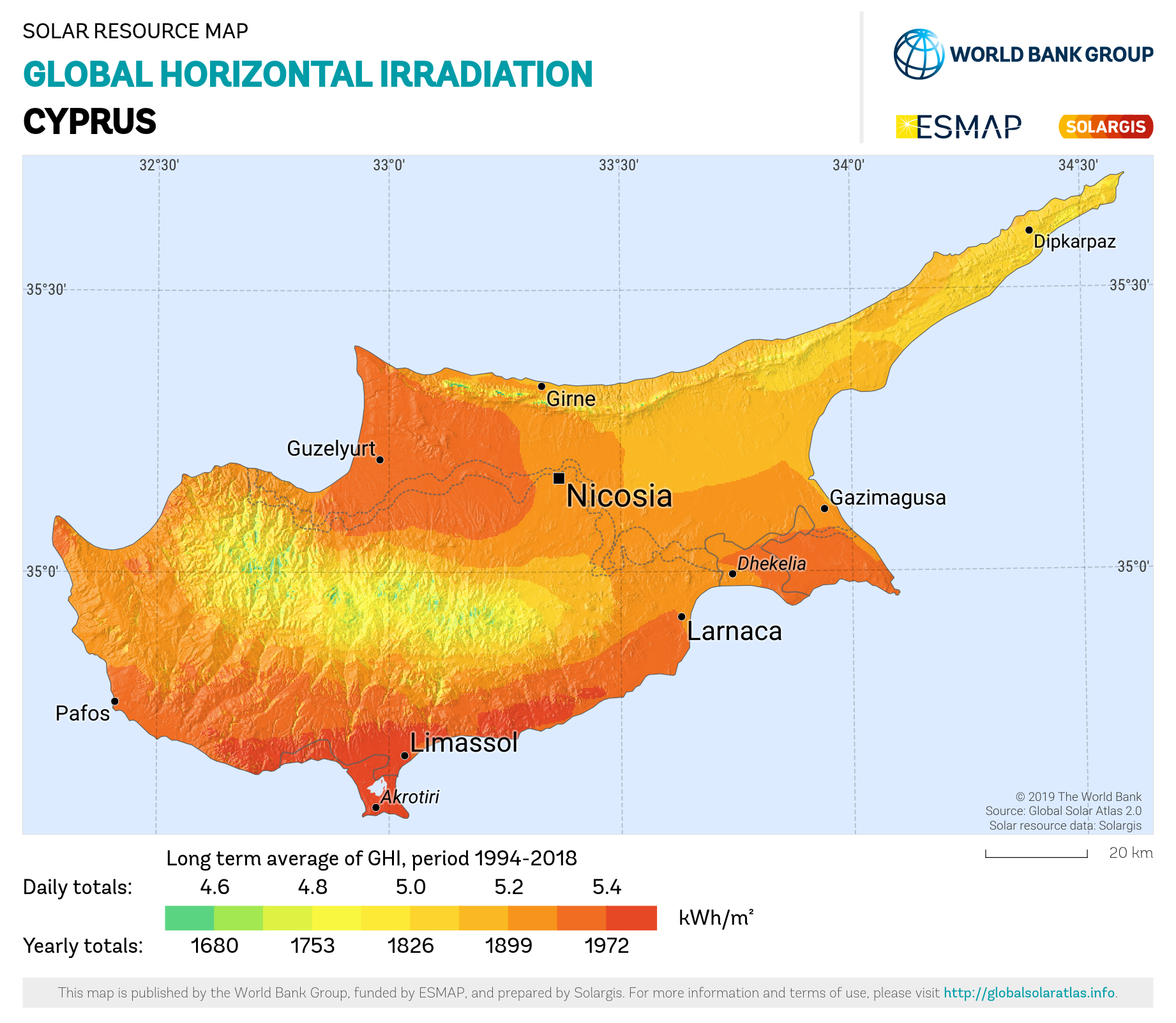
Solar potential of Cyprus

Solar power in Cyprus is more abundant in its potential than in almost all of the rest of Europe.

In 2010, solar heating per capita in Cyprus was the highest among all European countries, with 611 W per capita.

== Photovoltaics ==
Photovoltaics installed
Year	Installed (MW_{p})	Total (MW_{p})	Generation (GWh)
2009	1.1	3.3	2.9
2010	2.9	6.2	5.6
2011	3.8	10.1	12.0
2012	7.2	17.3	20.0
2013	17.5	34.8	45.8
2014	30.0	64.8	104.0
Source: PV Barometer

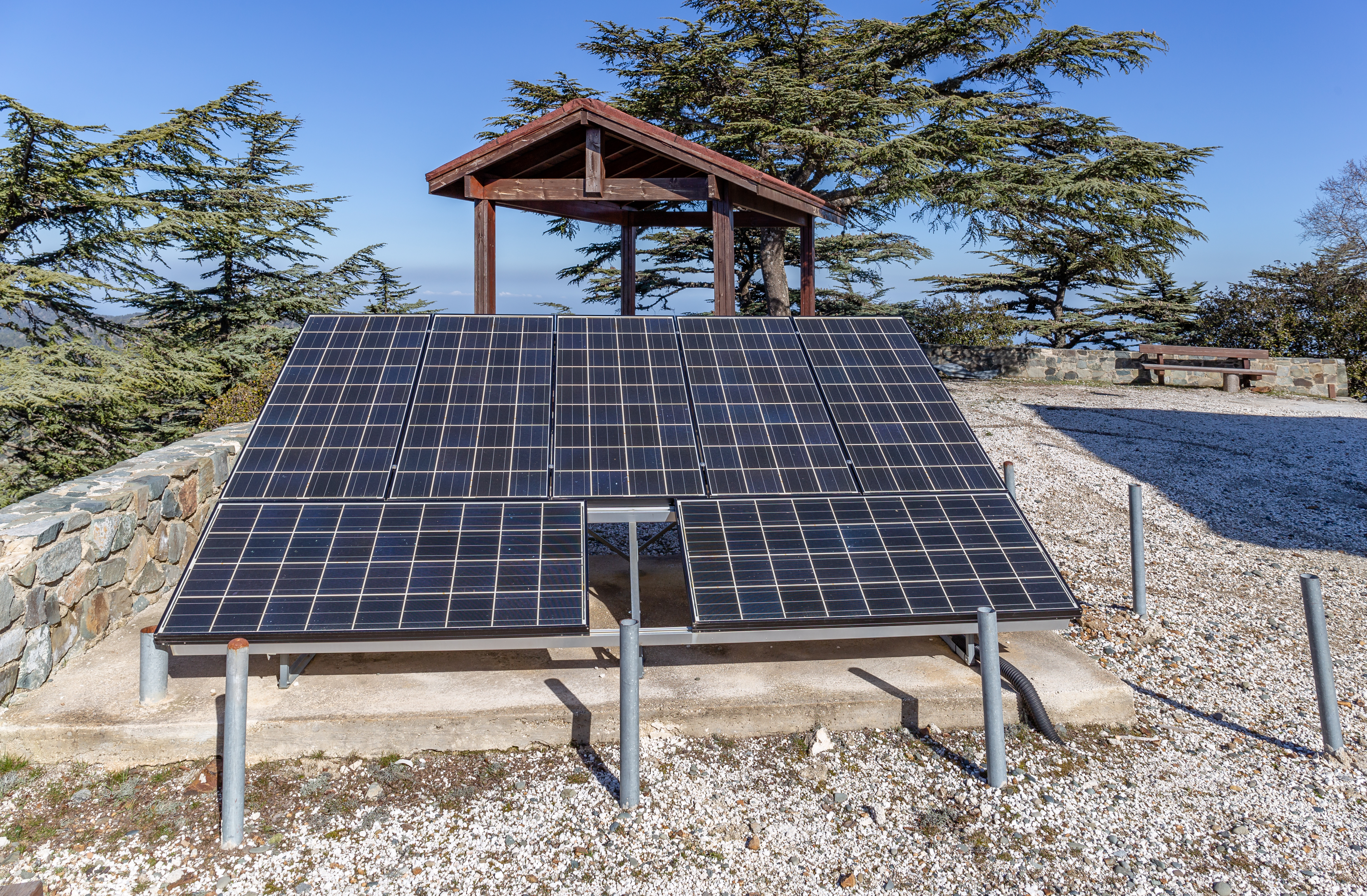
Solar panels at a tourist shelter, Troodos Mountains

The EAC (Electricity Authority of Cyprus) reported that 2,196 households installed rooftop solar panels in the first seven months of 2020, despite the global COVID-19 pandemic and the associated financial, economic, and social disturbances. Whilst this was on track to be the highest number of installations in a year (previously it was 5,083 systems installed in 2014), 2020 was also set to break the previous record for added capacity, which currently sits at 15.3MW. This record was also achieved in 2014.

The total number of households with photovoltaics was 16,546 as of September 2020. Solar energy and installation companies can be found in all of the major cities throughout the island, including Nicosia (the capital), Limassol, Larnaca, Famagusta and Paphos.

== Government targets ==
In 2011, the Cypriot target of solar power, including both photovoltaics and concentrated solar power, was a combined 7% of electricity by 2020.

Despite the seemingly optimistic outlook for solar power in Cyprus, the overall government response to the EU's Renewable Energy Directive has been less than stellar. Cyprus' National Energy and Climate Plan for the period 2021-2030 was sent back a number of times as being inadequate. There were also claims from government officials about fudging data in order to meet the RES targets for 2020.

== Largest PV power plants ==
Name of plant	Peak capacity (MW)	Start of operation	Notes
Vassiliko Cement Works Photovoltaic Park	8	2020	Located in the Amalas area covers approximately 10% of Vassiliko Cement Works needs in electricity.

== Recent developments ==
Solar photovoltaic capacity in Cyprus has continued to expand in the 2020s, with new installations in the first half of 2025 exceeding total additions record in 2024. Increasing penetration of solar power has led to grid integration constraints, with approximately 29% of renewable electricity generation curtailed in 2024 due to network limitations. Curtailment levels rose further in 2025, with some estimates indicating that nearly half of distributed renewable generation could not be absorbed by the grid. Academic analysis attributes these constraints to Cyprus’s isolated electricity system and limited grid flexibility.

== See also ==
- Energy in Cyprus
- List of renewable energy topics by country
- Renewable energy in Cyprus
- Solar power in the European Union
- Renewable energy by country
