= Evangelos Florakis =

Greek Army officer (1943-2002)

Evangelos Florakis (Greek: Ευάγγελος Φλωράκης, Tzoumerka 14 February 1943 – Paphos 10 July 2002) was a Greek Army officer who rose to the rank of lieutenant general. After retiring from the Hellenic Army, from 2000 until his death in a helicopter accident in 2002 he commanded the Cypriot National Guard.

== Life ==
Evangelos Florakis was born in Tzoumerka near Arta on 14 February 1943. He entered the Hellenic Army Academy in 1962 and graduated as an Infantry Second Lieutenant four years later, seventh of his class. Trained as a special forces officer, he served as commanding officer of the 31st Infantry Regiment, and served twice in Cyprus, as an officer with ELDYK and later, as a colonel, as deputy chief of staff of the Cypriot National Guard.

In 1994 he was promoted to the rank of brigadier and served as deputy commander of the 15th Infantry Division and subsequently as CO of the 50th Mechanized Infantry Brigade. In 1996 he was promoted to major general and given command of the 16th Mechanized Infantry Division. He subsequently served as director of the Supreme War Academy in Thessaloniki. In 1999, as a lieutenant general, he assumed command of the II Army Corps, which he led until his retirement in May 2000.

He was immediately recalled to service as Chief of the Cypriot National Guard (the senior command positions of the CNG are customarily filled by active or retired Greek officers), replacing Lt. General Dimitrios Dimou. Florakis was married to a Cypriot, Athina Savvidou from Paphos, and quickly became a popular and well-liked officer in Cyprus. He was killed in an accident on 10 July 2002 near Paphos, when his Bell 206 helicopter crashed. Aside from Florakis, the Air Force Commander Brigadier Stylianos Demenagas and three other officers were killed.

== Honours ==
Lt. General Florakis was awarded the Commander's crosses of the Order of Honour and of the Order of the Phoenix, as well as numerous other distinctions and commemorative medals.

The main naval base of the CNG, the Evangelos Florakis Naval Base in Mari, was later named after him.
