= Solar power in Poland =

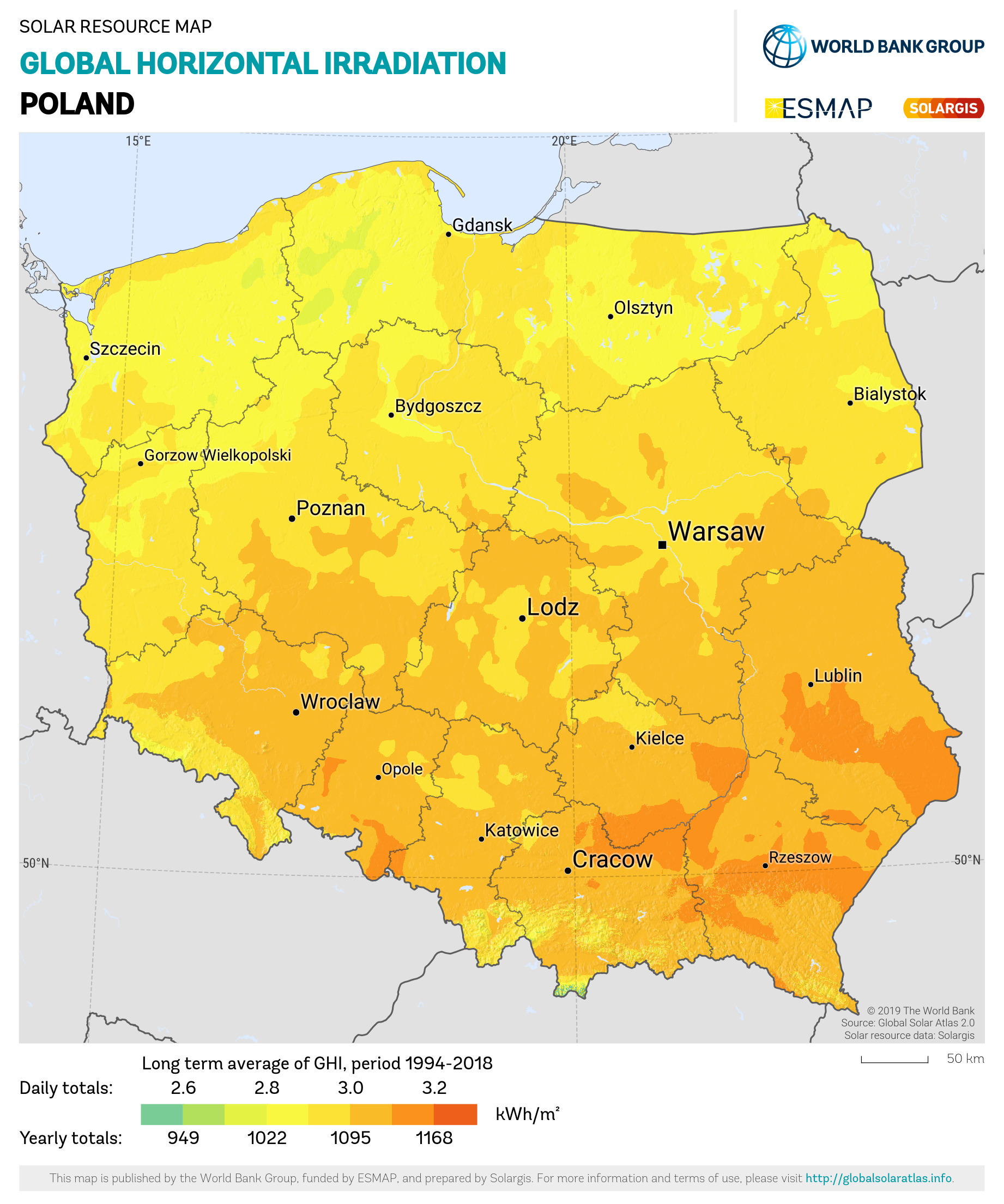
Average annual insolation in Poland

Solar energy in Poland is a rapidly growing sector of the country's renewable energy industry, driven by falling technology costs, government incentives, and increasing public interest in sustainable energy. Solar power is key to the Polish government's plan to produce 75% of electricity from carbon-free sources (renewables and nuclear) by 2040. As of May 31, 2026, Poland had a total of 26,871 MW in solar power grid-connected capacity.

In numbers:

- Capacity: 21.794 GW (▲25.66% YoY; 63.53% of renewable; 30.09% of overall),
- Generation: 17.334 TWh (▲31.23% YoY; 38.29% of renewable; 10.38% of overall),
- Capacity factor: 11.15%.

Capacity as of 28 February 2025. Generation and capacity factor as of 31 December 2024.

As of the end of February 2025, Poland's installed grid-connected photovoltaic (PV) capacity reached 21.8 GW, an increase of 25.7% over the previous year. Solar energy accounts for about 64% of the country's total renewable energy capacity of 34.3 GW and about 30% of its total installed power capacity of 72.4 GW. More than half of this solar capacity – around 12.2 GW – is generated by over 1.5 million micro-installations operated by prosumers.

By the end of 2021, there were also around 3 km^{2} (1.2 sq mi) of installed solar thermal collectors which in Poland are primarily used for heating up household water.

== Photovoltaics ==
Estimates of PV in Poland (MW_{peak})
2005	2006	2007	2008	2009	2010	2011	2012	2013	2014	2015	2016	2017	2018	2019	2020	2021	2022	2023	2024	2025
0.3	0.4	0.6	1	1	1.8	1.8	3.4	4.2	29.9	110	176	270	526	1428	3656	7091	11063	15917	21721	25421

Estimates of PV in Poland (MW_{peak})

== See also ==
- Energy in Poland
- Solar power by country
