= Energy in Cyprus =

Electricity in Cyprus is managed by the Electricity Authority of Cyprus. Power is primarily generated at three fuel oil-burning stations but the use of distributed renewable energy is expanding.

== Overview ==
Energy consumption by source, Cyprus

Electricity production by source, Cyprus

Energy in Cyprus
	Capita	Prim. energy	Production	Import	Electricity	CO_{2}-emission
	Million	TWh	TWh	TWh	TWh	Mt
2004	0.83	30.5	2.21	28.4	4.47	6.94
2007	0.79	28.4	0.81	33.5	4.65	7.35
2008	0.80	30.1	0.93	35.5	4.93	7.57
2009	0.81	29.2	0.93	33.8	5.04	7.46
2012	0.80				4.77	6.93
2012R	0.86	25.9	1.28	30.4	4.58	6.46
2013	0.87	22.4	1.28	27.0	4.10	5.62
Change 2004-09	-2.4%	-4.2%	-57.9%	19.3%	12.8%	7.5%
Mtoe = 11.63 TWh. Prim. energy includes energy losses 2012R = CO_{2} calculation criteria changed, numbers updated

About 97% of the primary energy use was imported in 2008. However, the European Union RES target (2020) for Cypus is 13% giving Cyprus an opportunity to promote its own energy production and increase its energy independence in the near future. According to the national action plan Cyprus expects it will also meet this target.

According to the IEA key statistics for 2010, Cypriot energy imports in 2008 were 5 TWh higher than the primary energy use. If correct, this corresponds to about 18% storage capacity of the annual energy use. There was an equal imbalance in 2007.

== Renewable energy ==
A recent scientific article published in Renewable and Sustainable Energy Reviews in 2014 by Prof. Mete Feridun of University of Greenwich in London and his colleagues investigates the long-run equilibrium relationship among international tourism, energy consumption, and carbon dioxide emissions (CO_{2}), and the direction of causality among these variables. The authors report evidence that international tourism is a catalyst for energy consumption and for an increase in the level of carbon dioxide emissions in Cyprus.

In 2021 Cyprus, amongst the EU members, was one of the least producing renewable energy.

The table below shows the renewable electricity generation in Cyprus since 2010 as a percentage of the total electricity generation, according to Eurostat.

Renewable Electricity Generation (GWh)
Year	Wind	Biofuel	Solar	% of Total
2010	32	35	6	1.39%
2011	106	52	12	3.45%
2012	161	50	22	4.93%
2013	190	49	47	6.65%
2014	188	51	84	7.40%
2015	205	51	128	8.45%
2016	222	52	146	8.59%
2017	222	52	172	8.91%
2018	217	57	200	9.36%
2019	225	58	218	9.76%

Renewable Electricity Generation (GWh)
Year	Wind	Biofuel	Solar	% of Total
2020	228	61	296	12.04%
2021	232	60	468	14.84%
2022	234	58	602	16.98%

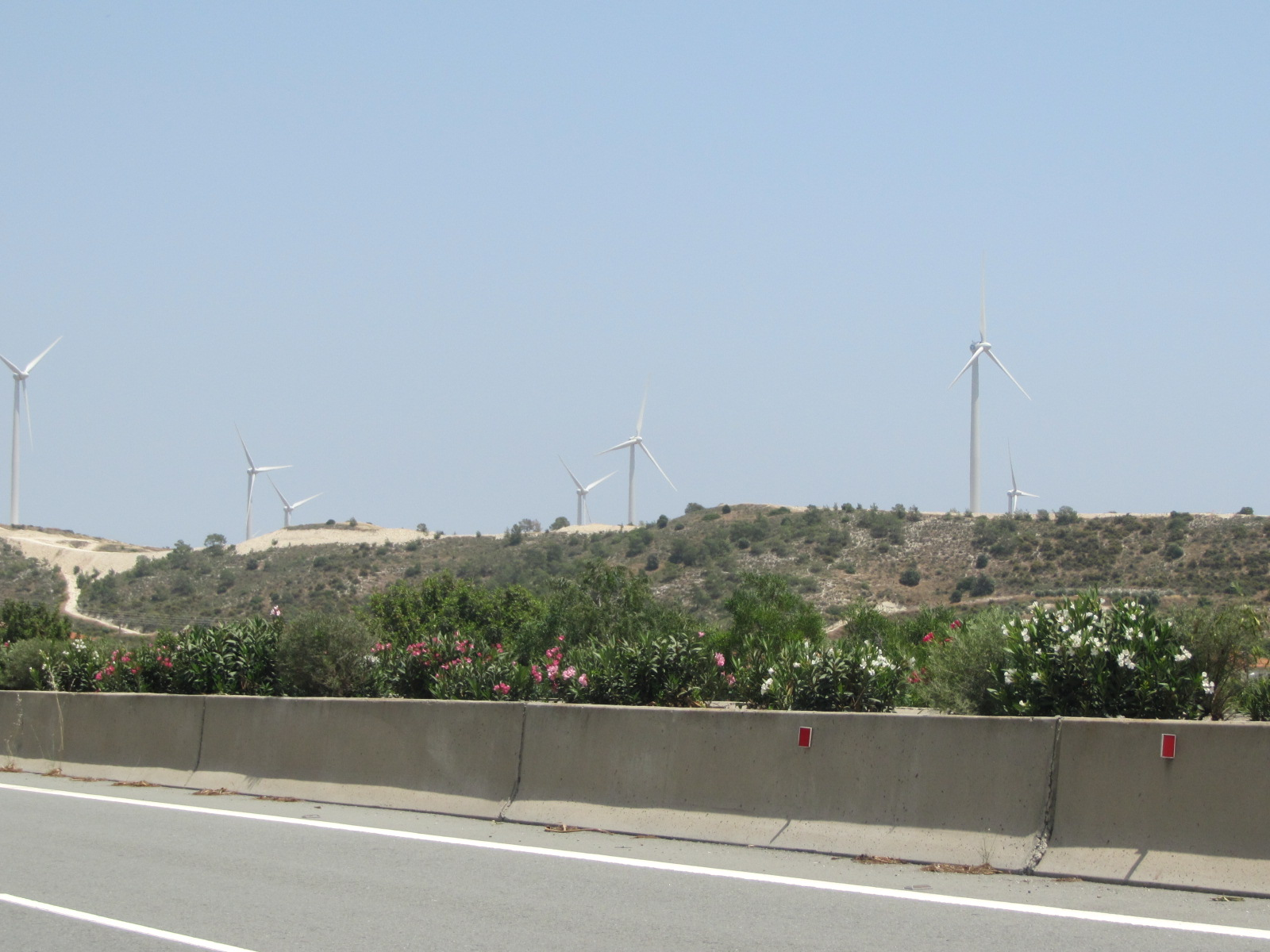
A wind farm in Cyprus

=== Wind power ===
With a feed-in tariff for large wind power plants, the Cypriot National Renewable Energy Action Plan targets a total of 6.8% of its renewable electricity share from wind power by 2020. In 2005 there was no wind energy; in 2023 it totaled 3.93% of electricity. The average target for all EU countries by 2020 is 14%.

=== Solar ===
The Cypriot target of solar power, including both photovoltaics and concentrated solar power, is a combined 7% of electricity by 2020, which will be one of the top percentages in the European Union markets. Respective targets are 8% for Spain, Germany 7%, Greece 5%, Portugal 4%, and Malta 1%.

Solar heating is the usage of solar energy to provide space or water heating. Solar heating per capita in 2010 was for Cyprus the highest of all European countries: 611 W per capita. The corresponding value in other top EU countries included Austria at 385, Greece 253 and Germany 120. In 2010 this capacity was the lowest in the EU, with high unutilised domestic energy opportunities: in Finland 4, Latvia 3, Estonia 1, and Lithuania 1. Correspondingly the value was high in Denmark with 68.

The number of photovoltaic systems in Cyprus rose by 66% in the year to July 2023, to over 45,000, with a capacity of 256 MW, the systems being used by each customer, including commercial, to reduce their electricity bill through an agreement of net-metering.

The United Nations Development Programme (UNDP) in Cyprus installed a 15 KW photovoltaic system at its offices. The park cost US$30,000 and is now connected to the grid.

==== Net metering ====
In 2011 the Cypriot Energy Regulatory Authority (CERA) announced a number of steps aimed at facilitating development of photovoltaics in Cyprus. Among them is the large-scale application of net metering. CERA aims to reduce electricity prices for the households where net metering is applied, via fuel saving and carbon dioxide reduction. Cyprus introduced net metering as pilot program in 2012. The program concerns selected governmental buildings and a few communities only. Its goal was to gain significant experience and knowledge on how to run the electricity grid using net metering.

The University of Cyprus announced plans for a second 10 to 13 MW solar park in 2013 and that it will lead a €1.3 million research program into the adoption of net metering across the European Union. The UoC will also lead an EU-funded European research program on promoting net metering policies. The university has signed a memorandum of co-operation with the Bishopric of Tamasos and Orini of the Church of Cyprus, to develop a photovoltaic park in the Cypriot capital of Nicosia.

==== Curtailment ====
The solar grid in Cyprus experiences high amounts of curtailment, with 29% in 2024 and approaching 46% in 2025, amounting to 306 GWh of solar energy discarded.

There are multiple factors contributing to the curtailment. Solar capacity has been steadily increasing in Cyprus partially as a result of government subsidies, but Cyprus does not have methods to deal with surplus energy generation. It lacks adequate battery storage solutions and cannot send energy out, being an isolated energy grid.

== Interconnectors ==
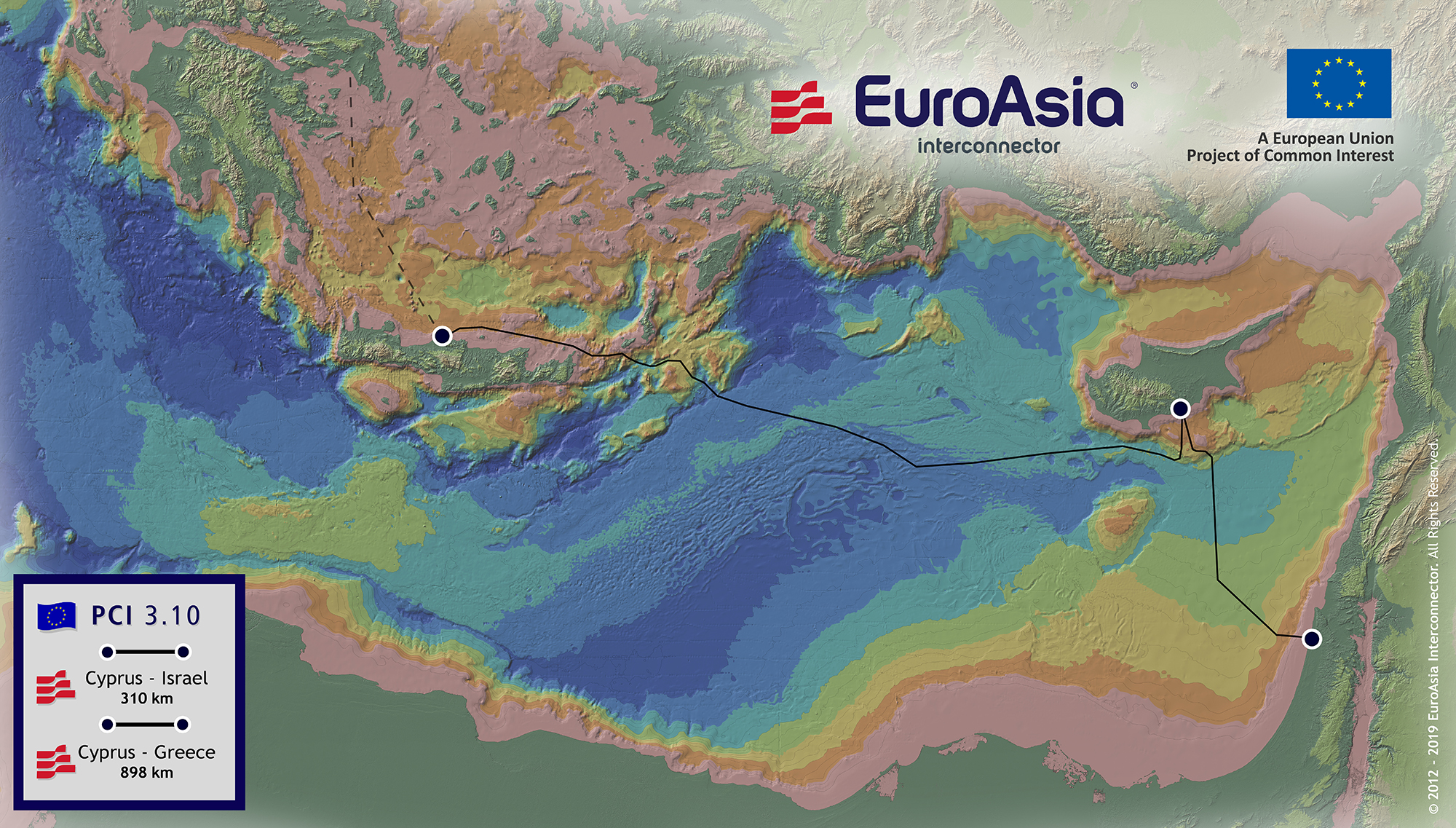
Map of EuroAsia Interconnector

The EuroAsia Interconnector is planned to connect Israel, Cyprus, and Greece with a 2000 MW HVDC undersea power cable. It is a leading Project of Common Interest of the European Union and also a priority for the Electricity Highway Interconnector Project. Cyprus, as the last EU member fully isolated from energy interconnections, will be connected to the European network.

The EuroAfrica Interconnector will connect Egypt, Cyprus, and Greece with another 2000 MW HVDC undersea power cable. These projects will allow Cyprus to use cheaper and cleaner electricity from the mainland rather than burn imported oil in less-efficient, dirtier generators.

== See also ==
- Block 12
- Solar power in Cyprus
- Renewable energy by country
