= Geothermal power in South Korea =

Geothermal power in South Korea remains largely untapped due to geological constraints, as the country lacks the high-temperature resources typically associated with active volcanoes or significant tectonic activities. Instead, the focus has shifted towards the direct use of geothermal energy through ground-source or geothermal heat pumps (GSHPs), with the installed capacity reaching approximately 1.685 GWth by the end of 2022. Despite an estimated geothermal technical potential of 19.6 GWe, South Korea has no operational geothermal power plants. The pilot Enhanced Geothermal System (EGS) project started in 2010 was halted after a magnitude 5.4 earthquake in 2017 near the EGS site, which raised safety concerns about induced seismic activity and led to the cessation of deep geothermal exploration and a reduction in funding for geothermal research.

In a related development, the Seoul Metropolitan Government has announced plans to power public buildings with geothermal energy as part of its climate action plan to achieve carbon neutrality by 2050. The 2017 earthquake in Pohang, the second most powerful in the region, is believed to have been triggered by geothermal power plant activities, further influencing government and public perspectives on geothermal energy.

== Power station ==
In Korea, there is a geothermal power plant in Pohang, North Gyeongsang.

== See also ==
- List of geothermal power stations
- Energy in South Korea
- Electricity sector in South Korea
- Hydroelectricity in South Korea
- Solar power in South Korea
- Wind power in South Korea
- Renewable energy by country
