= Hydroelectricity in South Korea =

Hydroelectric power generation in South Korea

Hydroelectricity in South Korea includes conventional hydroelectric power and pumped-storage hydroelectricity. Operators include Korea Hydro & Nuclear Power (KHNP) and Korea Water Resources Corporation (K-water).

== Hydroelectric power stations ==
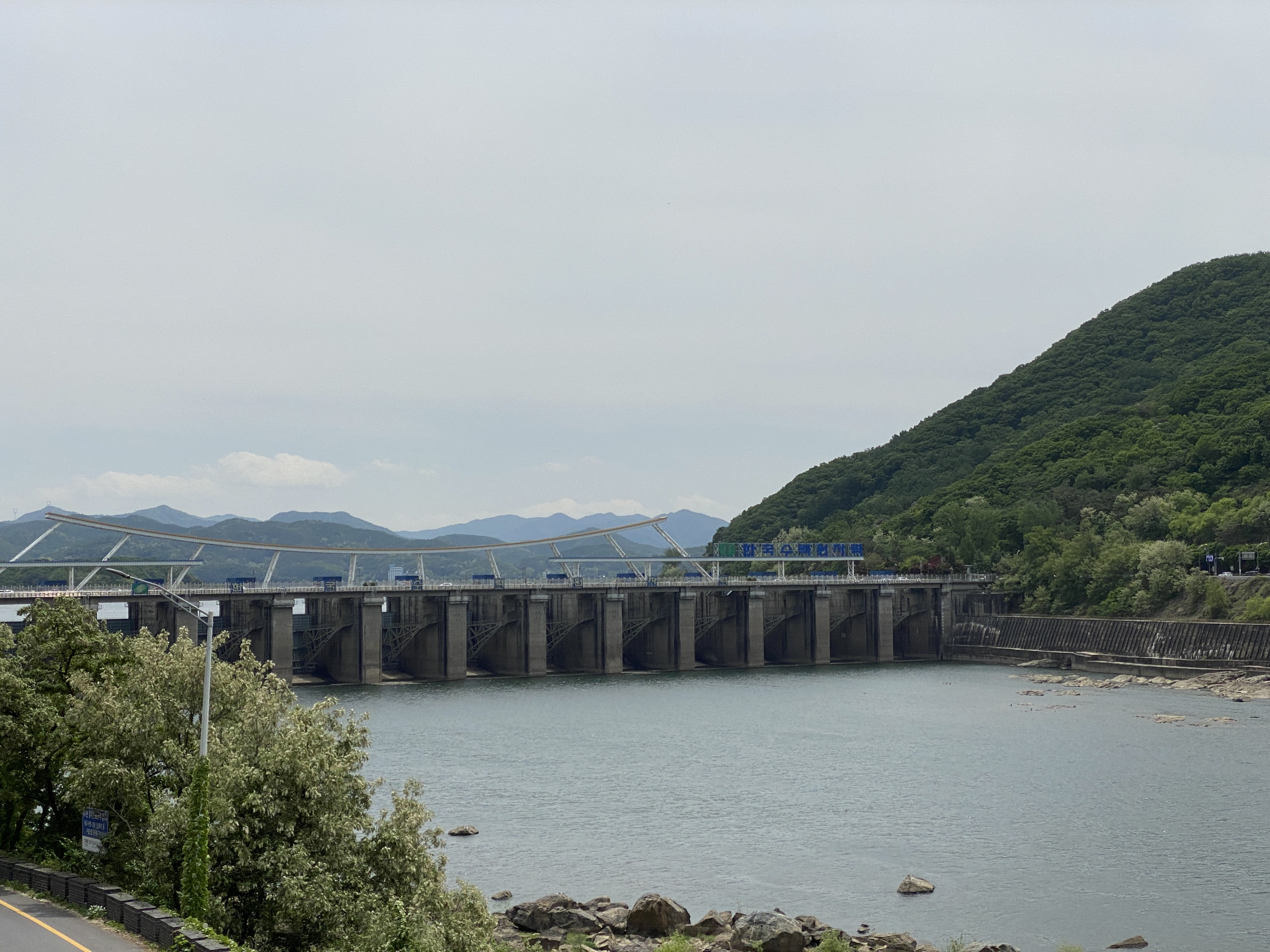
Paldang Dam

=== Conventional hydropower ===
The following is a selected list of conventional hydroelectric power stations. Capacities are total installed generating capacities.

Station	Capacity (MW)	Operator	Province or provincial-level city	References
Chungju	412	K-water	North Chungcheong	
Soyanggang	200	K-water	Gangwon	
Cheongpyeong	140.1	Korea Hydro & Nuclear Power	Gyeonggi	
Paldang	120	Korea Hydro & Nuclear Power	Gyeonggi	
Hwacheon	108	Korea Hydro & Nuclear Power	Gangwon	
Gangneung	82	Korea Hydro & Nuclear Power	Gangwon	
Chuncheon	62.28	Korea Hydro & Nuclear Power	Gangwon	
Uiam	48	Korea Hydro & Nuclear Power	Gangwon	
Chilbo	35.4	Korea Hydro & Nuclear Power	North Jeolla	
Boseonggang	4.5	Korea Hydro & Nuclear Power	Jeonnam-Gwangju	
Goesan	2.8	Korea Hydro & Nuclear Power	North Chungcheong	
Gangrim (formerly Anheung)	0.48	Korea Hydro & Nuclear Power	Gangwon	

Chungju's capacity includes the 400 MW main station and the 12 MW regulating-dam station.

=== Pumped storage ===
KHNP lists seven pumped-storage power stations with a combined installed generating capacity of 4,700 MW. These stations pump water from a lower reservoir to an upper reservoir for storage and release it to generate electricity during periods of peak demand.

Station	Capacity (MW)	Operator	Province	Completion year	References
Yangyang	1,000	Korea Hydro & Nuclear Power	Gangwon	2006	
Yecheon	800	Korea Hydro & Nuclear Power	North Gyeongsang	2011	
Sancheong	700	Korea Hydro & Nuclear Power	South Gyeongsang	2001	
Cheongsong	600	Korea Hydro & Nuclear Power	North Gyeongsang	2006	
Muju	600	Korea Hydro & Nuclear Power	North Jeolla	1995	
Samnangjin	600	Korea Hydro & Nuclear Power	South Gyeongsang	1985	
Cheongpyeong	400	Korea Hydro & Nuclear Power	Gyeonggi	1980	

== See also ==
- Energy in South Korea
- Electricity sector in South Korea
- Geothermal power in South Korea
- Wind power in South Korea
- Solar power in South Korea
- Renewable energy by country
