= Hydroelectricity =

Electricity generated by hydropower

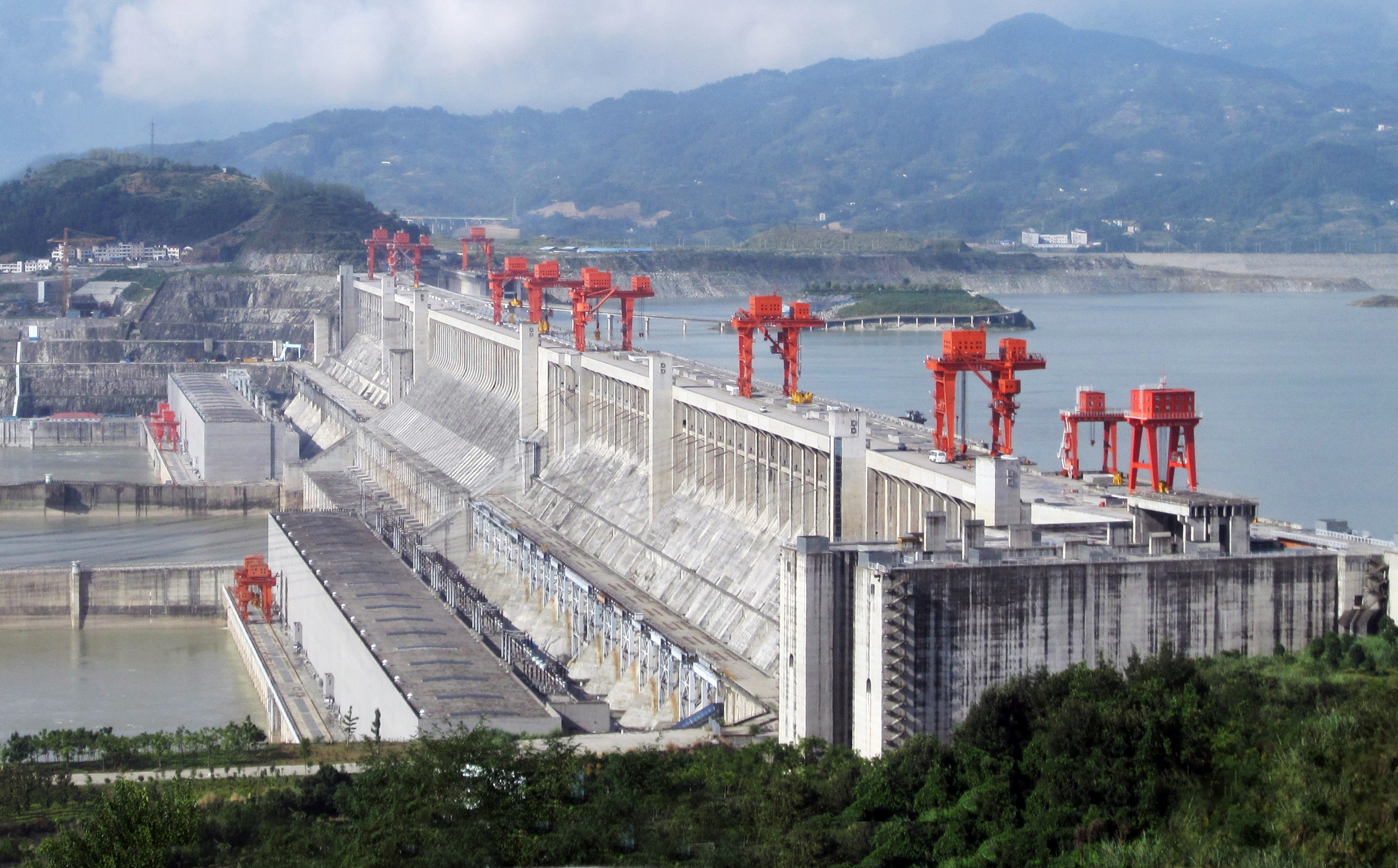
The Three Gorges Dam in Central China is the world's largest power-producing facility of any kind.

Hydroelectricity, or hydroelectric power, is electricity generated from hydropower. Hydropower supplies 15% of the world's electricity, almost 4,210 TWh in 2023, which is more than all other renewable sources combined and also more than nuclear power. Hydropower can provide large amounts of low-carbon electricity on demand, making it a key element for creating secure and clean electricity supply systems. A hydroelectric power station that has a dam and reservoir is a flexible source, since the amount of electricity produced can be increased or decreased in seconds or minutes in response to varying electricity demand. Once a hydroelectric complex is constructed, it produces no direct waste, and almost always emits considerably less greenhouse gas than fossil fuel-powered energy plants. However, when constructed in lowland rainforest areas, where part of the forest is inundated, substantial amounts of greenhouse gases may be emitted.

Construction of a hydroelectric complex can have significant environmental impact, principally in loss of arable land and population displacement. They also disrupt the natural ecology of the river involved, affecting habitats and ecosystems, and siltation and erosion patterns. While dams can ameliorate the risks of flooding, dam failure can be catastrophic.

In 2025, global installed hydropower electrical capacity reached almost 1,456 GW, the highest among all renewable energy technologies. Hydroelectricity plays a leading role in countries like Brazil, Norway and China. but there are geographical limits and environmental issues. Tidal power can be used in coastal regions.

China added 24 GW in 2022, accounting for nearly three-quarters of global hydropower capacity additions. Europe added 2 GW, the largest amount for the region since 1990. Meanwhile, globally, hydropower generation increased by 70 TWh (up 2%) in 2022 and remains the largest renewable energy source, surpassing all other technologies combined.

== History ==
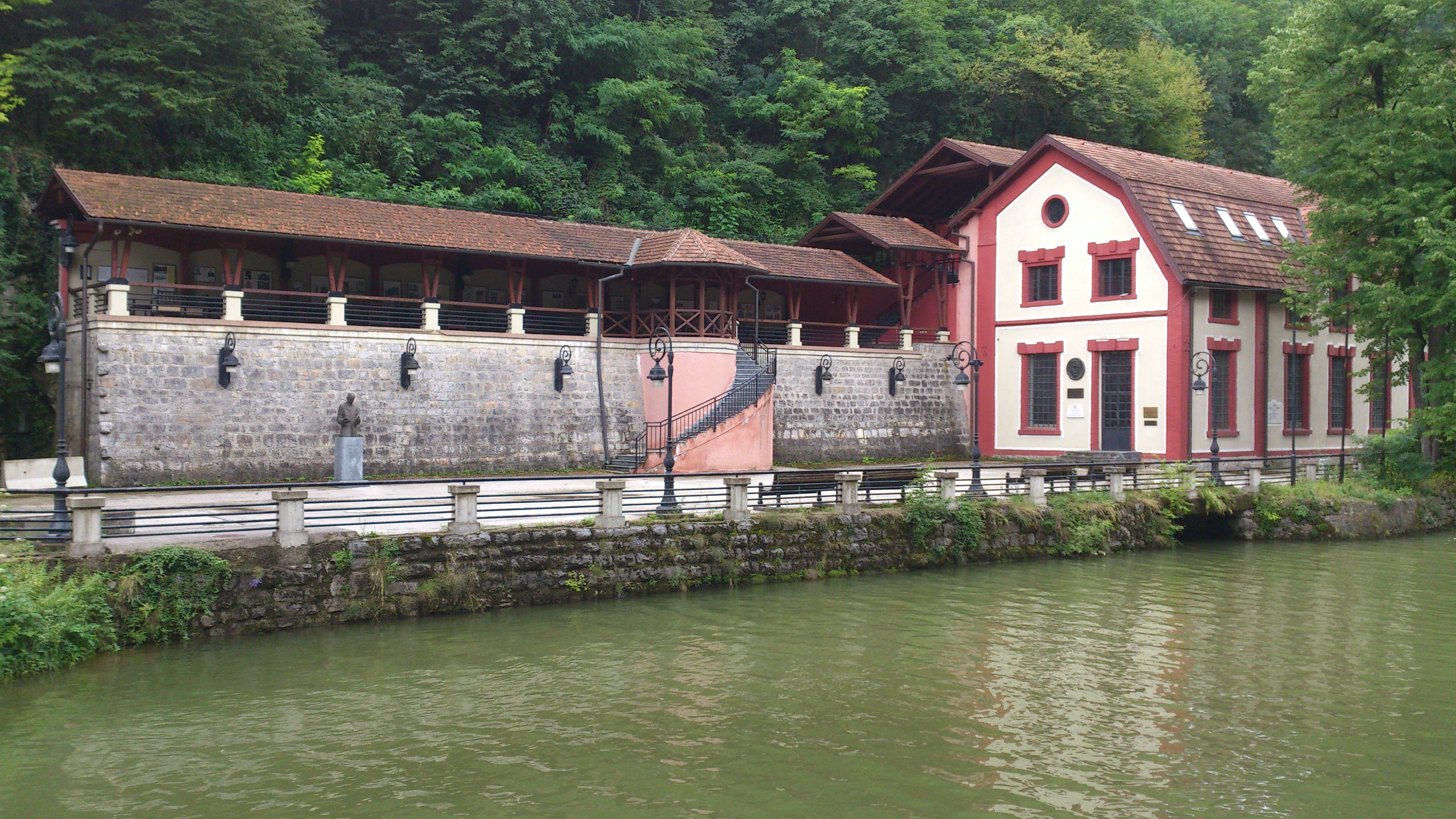
Museum Hydroelectric power plant "Under the Town" in Užice, Serbia, built in 1900

The use of hydropower and water to generate mechanical energy can be traced back to 203 BC ancient China and the Han dynasty. In the late 18th century hydraulic power provided the energy source needed for the start of the Industrial Revolution. In the mid-1700s, French engineer Bernard Forest de Bélidor published Architecture Hydraulique, which described vertical- and horizontal-axis hydraulic machines, and in 1771 Richard Arkwright's combination of water power, the water frame, and continuous production played a significant part in the development of the factory system, with modern employment practices. In the 1840s, hydraulic power networks were developed to generate and transmit hydro power to end users.

By the late 19th century, the electrical generator was developed and could now be coupled with hydraulics. The growing demand arising from the Industrial Revolution would drive development as well. In 1878, the world's first hydroelectric power scheme was developed at Cragside in Northumberland, England, by William Armstrong. It was used to power a single arc lamp in his art gallery. The old Schoelkopf Power Station No. 1, US, near Niagara Falls, began to produce electricity in 1881. On September 5, 1882, generators at St. Anthony Falls on the Mississippi River sent power to light arc lamps along Washington Avenue in Minneapolis, Minnesota. The first Edison hydroelectric power station, the Vulcan Street Plant, began operating on September 30, 1882, in Appleton, Wisconsin, with an output of about 12.5 kilowatts. By 1886, there were 45 hydroelectric power stations in the United States and Canada; and by 1889, there were 200 in the United States alone.

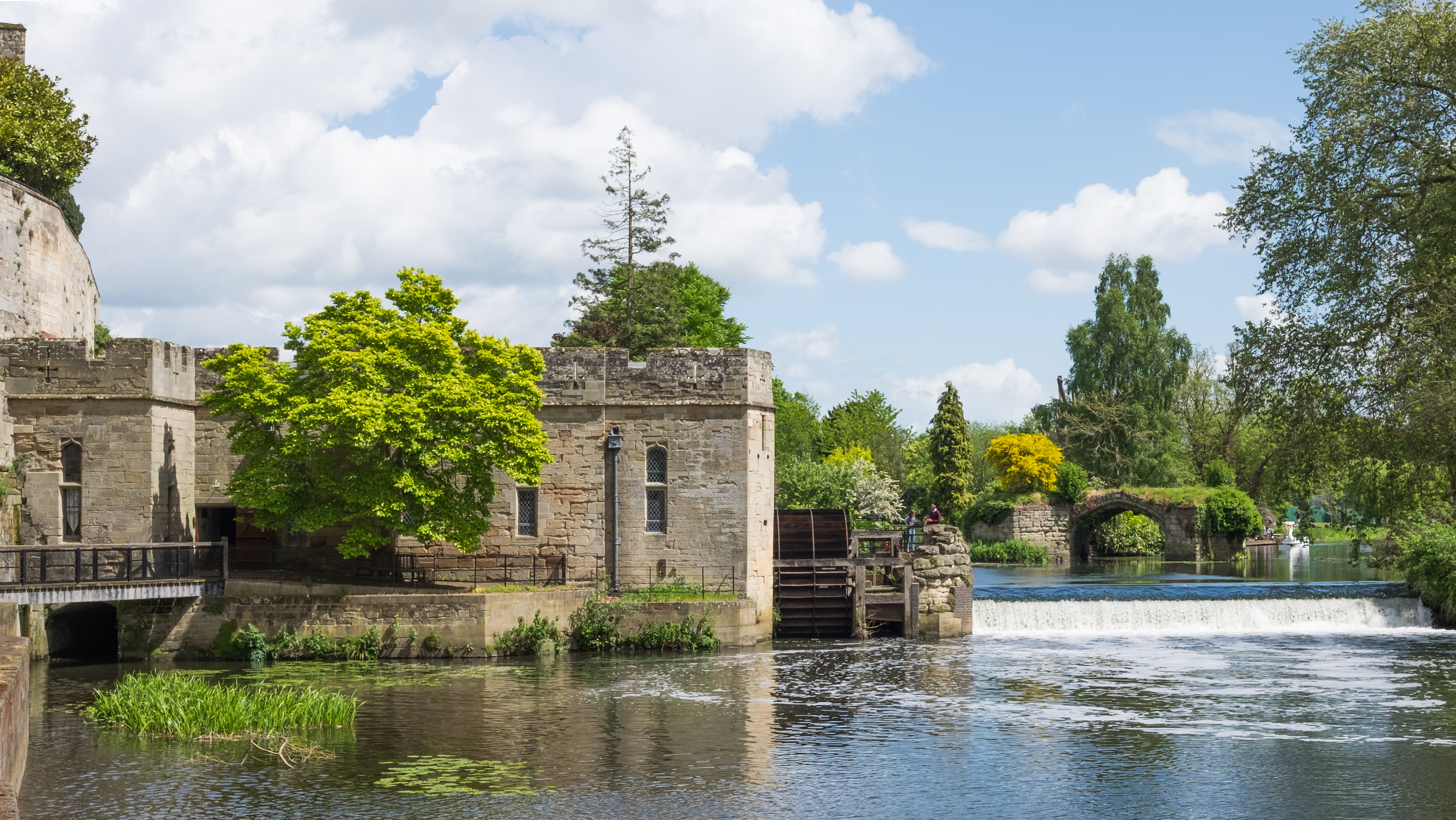
The Warwick Castle water-powered generator house, used for the generation of electricity for the castle from 1894 until 1940

At the beginning of the 20th century, many small hydroelectric power stations were being constructed by commercial companies in mountains near metropolitan areas. Grenoble, France held the International Exhibition of Hydropower and Tourism, with over one million visitors 1925. By 1920, when 40% of the power produced in the United States was hydroelectric, the Federal Power Act was enacted into law. The Act created the Federal Power Commission to regulate hydroelectric power stations on federal land and water. As the power stations became larger, their associated dams developed additional purposes, including flood control, irrigation and navigation. Federal funding became necessary for large-scale development, and federally owned corporations, such as the Tennessee Valley Authority (1933) and the Bonneville Power Administration (1937), were created. Additionally, the Bureau of Reclamation which had begun a series of western US irrigation projects in the early 20th century, was now constructing large hydroelectric projects such as the 1928 Hoover Dam. The United States Army Corps of Engineers was also involved in hydroelectric development, completing the Bonneville Dam in 1937 and being recognized by the Flood Control Act of 1936 as the premier federal flood control agency.

Hydroelectric power stations continued to become larger throughout the 20th century. Hydropower was referred to as "white coal". Hoover Dam's initial 1,345 MW power station was the world's largest hydroelectric power station in 1936; it was eclipsed by the 6,809 MW Grand Coulee Dam in 1942. The Itaipu Dam opened in 1984 in South America as the largest, producing 14 GW, but was surpassed in 2008 by the Three Gorges Dam in China at 22.5 GW. Hydroelectricity would eventually supply some countries, including Norway, Democratic Republic of the Congo, Paraguay and Brazil, with over 85% of their electricity.

== Future potential ==
In 2021, the International Energy Agency (IEA) said that more efforts are needed to help limit climate change. Some countries have highly developed their hydropower potential and have very little room for growth: Switzerland produces 88% of its potential and Mexico 80%. In 2022, the IEA released a main-case forecast of an increase of 141 GW generated by hydropower over 2022–2027, which is slightly lower than increase achieved from 2017–2022. Because environmental permitting and construction times are long, they estimate hydropower increase will remain limited, with only an additional 40 GW deemed possible in the accelerated case.

=== Modernization of existing infrastructure ===
In 2021, the IEA said that major modernisation refurbishments are required.

== Generating methods ==
=== Conventional (dams) ===
Cross-section of a conventional hydroelectric dam

Most hydroelectric power comes from the potential energy of dammed water driving a water turbine and generator. The power extracted from the water depends on the volume and on the difference in height between the source and the water's outflow. This height difference is called the head. A large pipe (the "penstock") delivers water from the reservoir to the turbine.

=== Pumped-storage ===
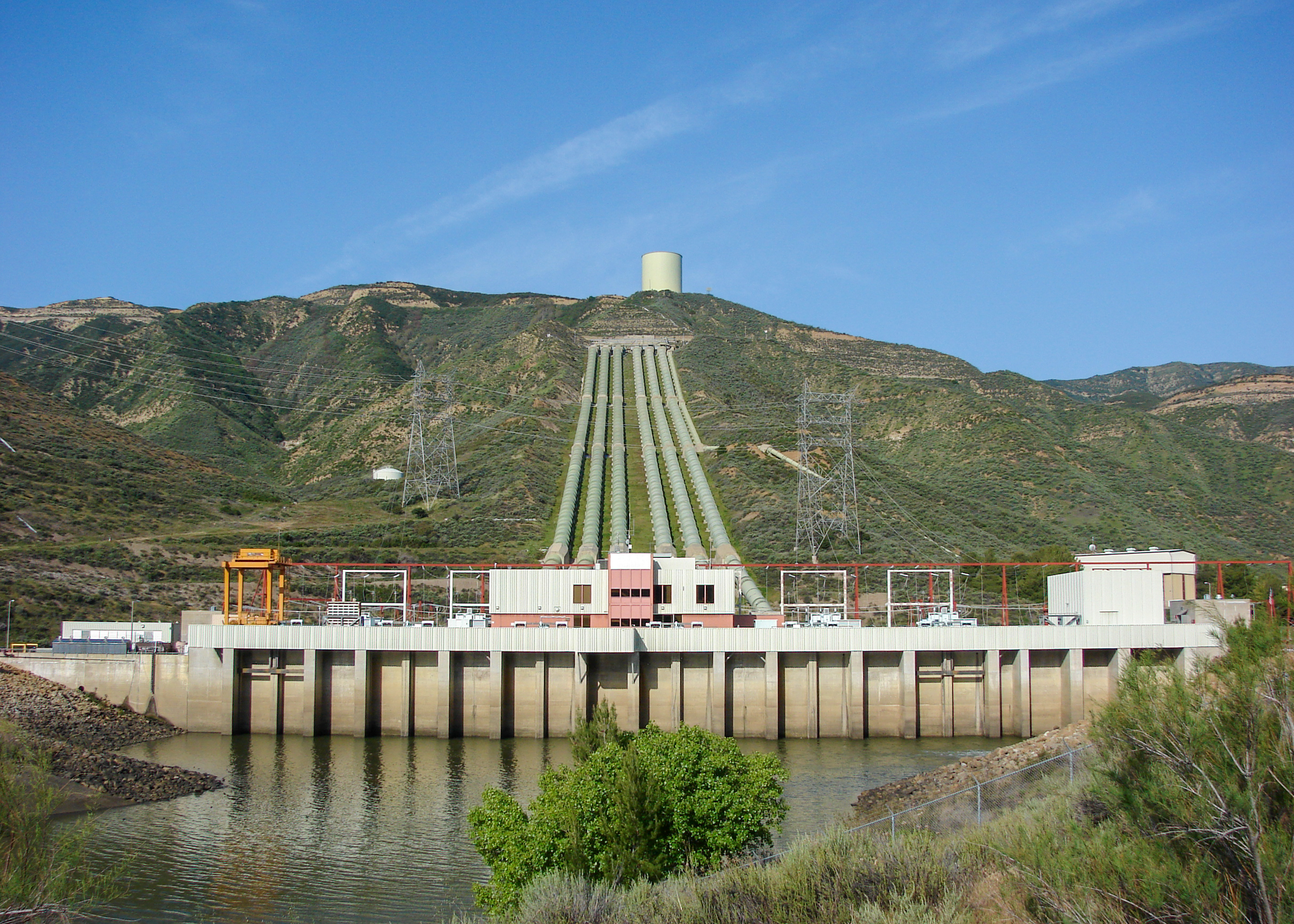
Pumped-storage

This method produces electricity to supply high peak demands by moving water between reservoirs at different elevations. At times of low electrical demand, the excess generation capacity is used to pump water into the higher reservoir, thus providing demand side response. When the demand becomes greater, water is released back into the lower reservoir through a turbine. In 2021, pumped-storage schemes provided almost 85% of the world's 190 GW of grid energy storage and improved the daily capacity factor of the generation system. Pumped storage is not an energy source, and appears as a negative number in listings.

=== Run-of-the-river ===
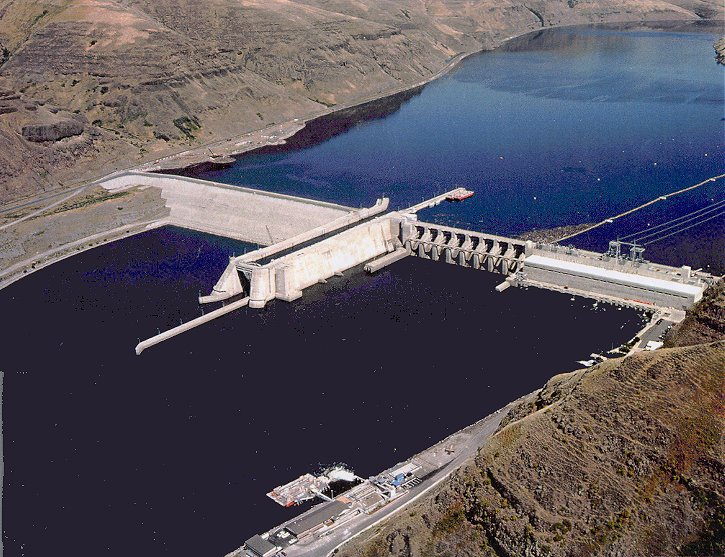
Run-of-the-river

Run-of-the-river hydroelectric stations are those with small or no reservoir capacity, so that only the water coming from upstream is available for generation at that moment, and any oversupply must pass unused. A constant supply of water from a lake or existing reservoir upstream is a significant advantage in choosing sites for run-of-the-river.

=== Tide ===
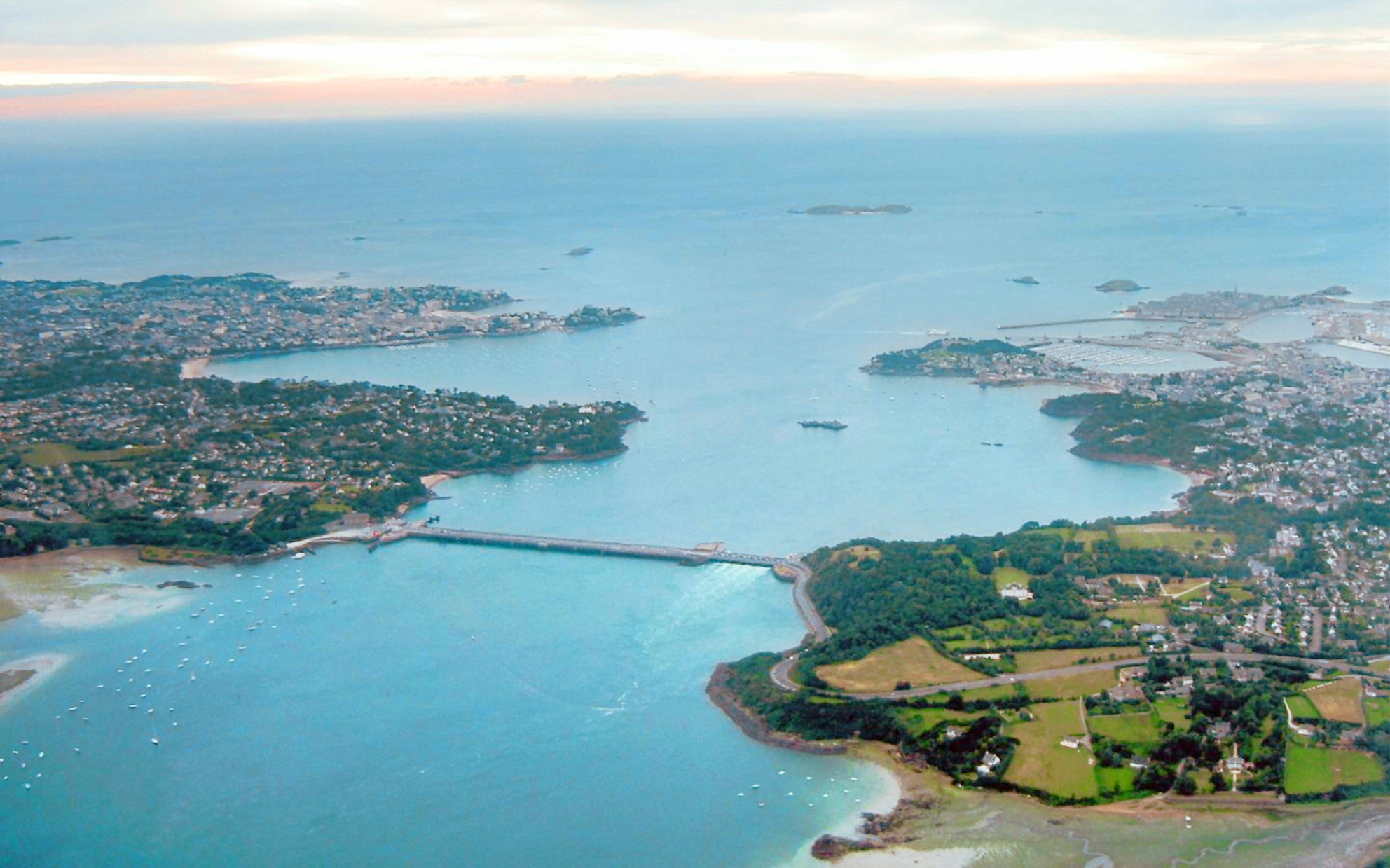
Tidal

A tidal power station makes use of the daily rise and fall of ocean water due to tides; such sources are highly predictable, and if conditions permit construction of reservoirs, can also be dispatchable to generate power during high demand periods. Less common types of hydro schemes use water's kinetic energy or undammed sources such as undershot water wheels. Tidal power is viable in a relatively small number of locations around the world.

=== Conduit ===
Conduit hydroelectricity stations use the mechanical energy of water as part of the water delivery system through man-made conduits to generate electricity. Generally, the conduits are existing water pipelines such as in public water supply. Some definitions expand the definition of conduits to include existing tunnels, canals, or aqueducts that are used primarily for other water delivery purposes than electricity generation.

== Sizes, types and capacities of hydroelectric facilities ==
The classification of hydropower plants starts with two top-level categories:

- small hydropower plants (SHP) and
- large hydropower plants (LHP).

The classification of a plant as an SHP or LHP is primarily based on its nameplate capacity, the threshold varies by the country, but in any case a plant with the capacity of 50 MW or more is considered an LHP. As an example, for China, SHP power is below 25 MW, for India – below 15 MW, most of Europe – below 10 MW.

The SHP and LHP categories are further subdivided into many subcategories that are not mutually exclusive. For example, a low-head hydro power plant with hydrostatic head of few meters to few tens of meters can be classified either as an SHP or an LHP. The other distinction between SHP and LHP is the degree of the water flow regulation: a typical SHP primarily uses the natural water discharge with very little regulation in comparison to an LHP. Therefore, the term SHP is frequently used as a synonym for the run-of-the-river power plant.

=== Large facilities ===
The largest power producers in the world are hydroelectric power stations, with some hydroelectric facilities capable of generating more than double the installed capacities of the current largest nuclear power stations.

Although no official definition exists for the capacity range of large hydroelectric power stations, facilities from over a few hundred megawatts are generally considered large hydroelectric facilities.

Currently, only seven facilities over 10 GW (10,000 MW) are in operation worldwide, see table below.

Rank	Station	Country	Location	Capacity (MW)
1.	Three Gorges Dam	China	30°49′15″N 111°00′08″E	22,500
2.	Baihetan Dam	China	27°13′23″N 102°54′11″E	16,000
3.	Itaipu Dam	Brazil; Paraguay	25°24′31″S 54°35′21″W	14,000
4.	Xiluodu Dam	China	28°15′35″N 103°38′58″E	13,860
5.	Belo Monte Dam	Brazil	03°06′57″S 51°47′45″W	11,233
6.	Guri Dam	Venezuela	07°45′59″N 62°59′57″W	10,235
7.	Wudongde Dam	China	26°20′2″N 102°37′48″E	10,200

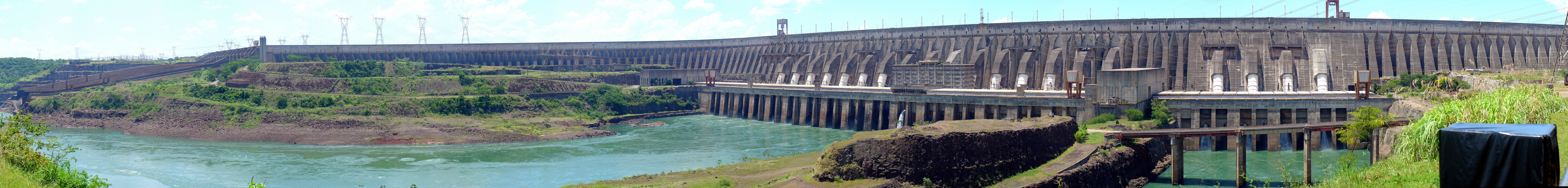
Panoramic view of the Itaipu Dam, with the spillways (closed at the time of the photo) on the left. In 1994, the American Society of Civil Engineers elected the Itaipu Dam as one of the Seven Wonders of the Modern World.

=== Small ===
Small hydro is hydroelectric power on a scale serving a small community or industrial plant. The definition of a small hydro project varies but a generating capacity of up to 10 megawatts (MW) is generally accepted as the upper limit. This may be stretched to 25 MW and 30 MW in Canada and the United States.

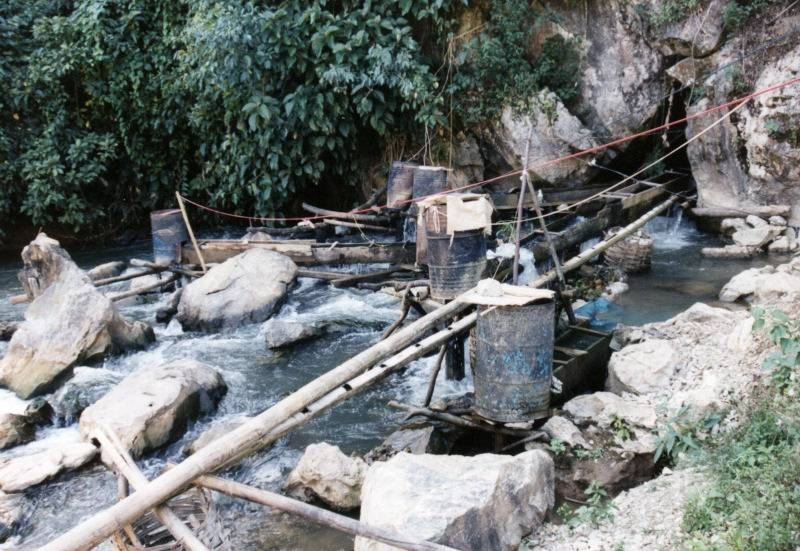
A micro-hydro facility in Vietnam

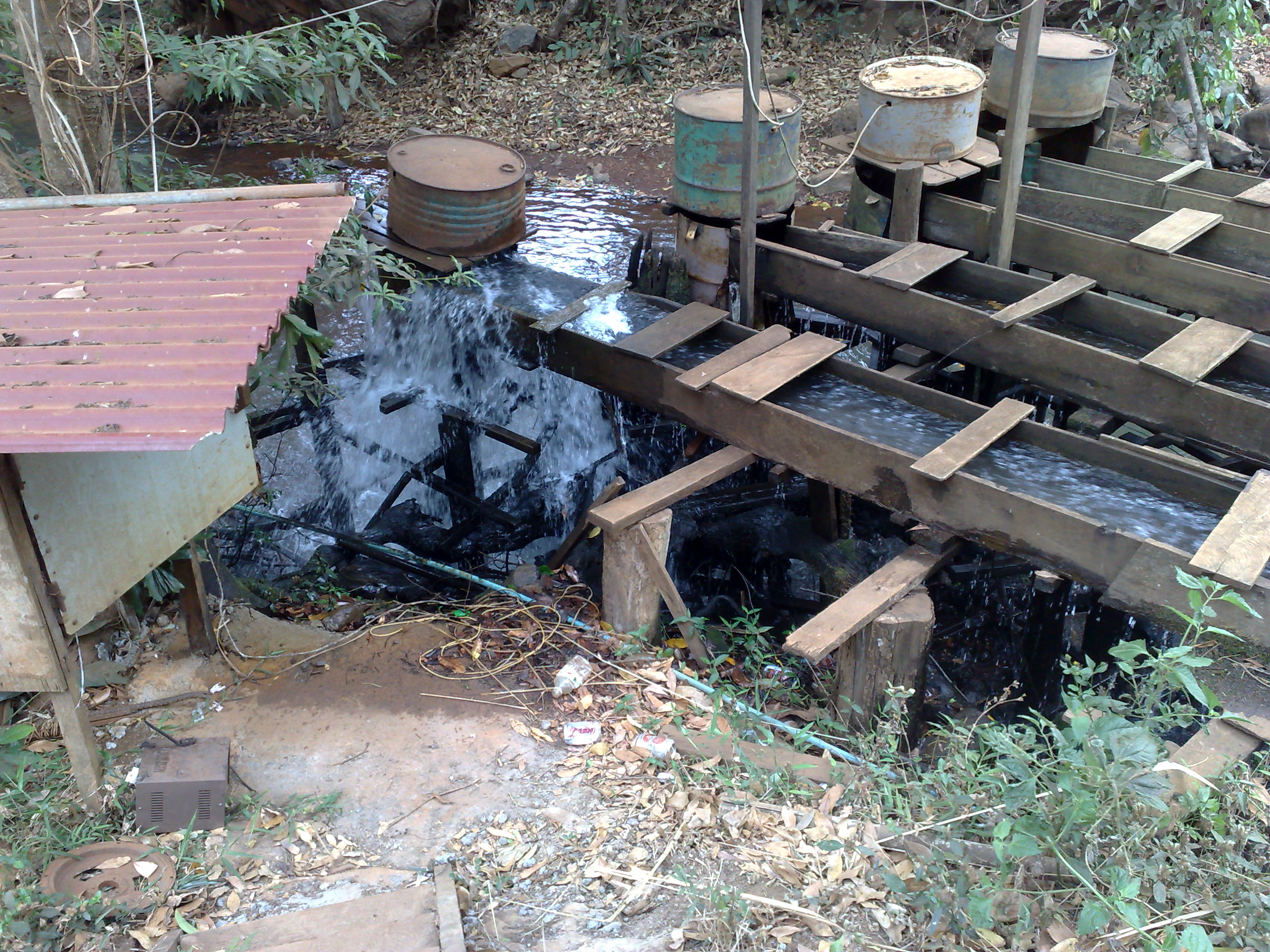
Pico hydroelectricity in Mondulkiri, Cambodia

Small hydro stations may be connected to conventional electrical distribution networks as a source of low-cost renewable energy. Alternatively, small hydro projects may be built in isolated areas that would be uneconomic to serve from a grid, or in areas where there is no national electrical distribution network. Since small hydro projects usually have minimal reservoirs and civil construction work, they are seen as having a relatively low environmental impact compared to large hydro. This decreased environmental impact depends strongly on the balance between stream flow and power production.

=== Micro ===
Micro hydro means hydroelectric power installations that typically produce up to 100 kW of power. These installations can provide power to an isolated home or small community, or are sometimes connected to electric power networks. There are many of these installations around the world, particularly in developing nations, as they can provide an economical source of energy without the purchase of fuel. Micro hydro systems complement photovoltaic solar energy systems because in many areas water flow, and thus available hydro power, is highest in the winter when solar energy is at a minimum.

=== Pico ===
Pico hydro is hydroelectric power generation of under 5 kW. It is useful in small, remote communities that require only a small amount of electricity. For example, the 1.1 kW Intermediate Technology Development Group Pico Hydro Project in Kenya supplies 57 homes with very small electric loads (e.g., a couple of lights and a phone charger, or a small TV/radio). Even smaller turbines of 200–300 W may power a few homes in a developing country with a drop of only 1 m (3 ft). A Pico-hydro setup is typically run-of-the-river, meaning that dams are not used, but rather pipes divert some of the flow, drop it down a gradient, and through the turbine before returning it to the stream.

=== Underground ===
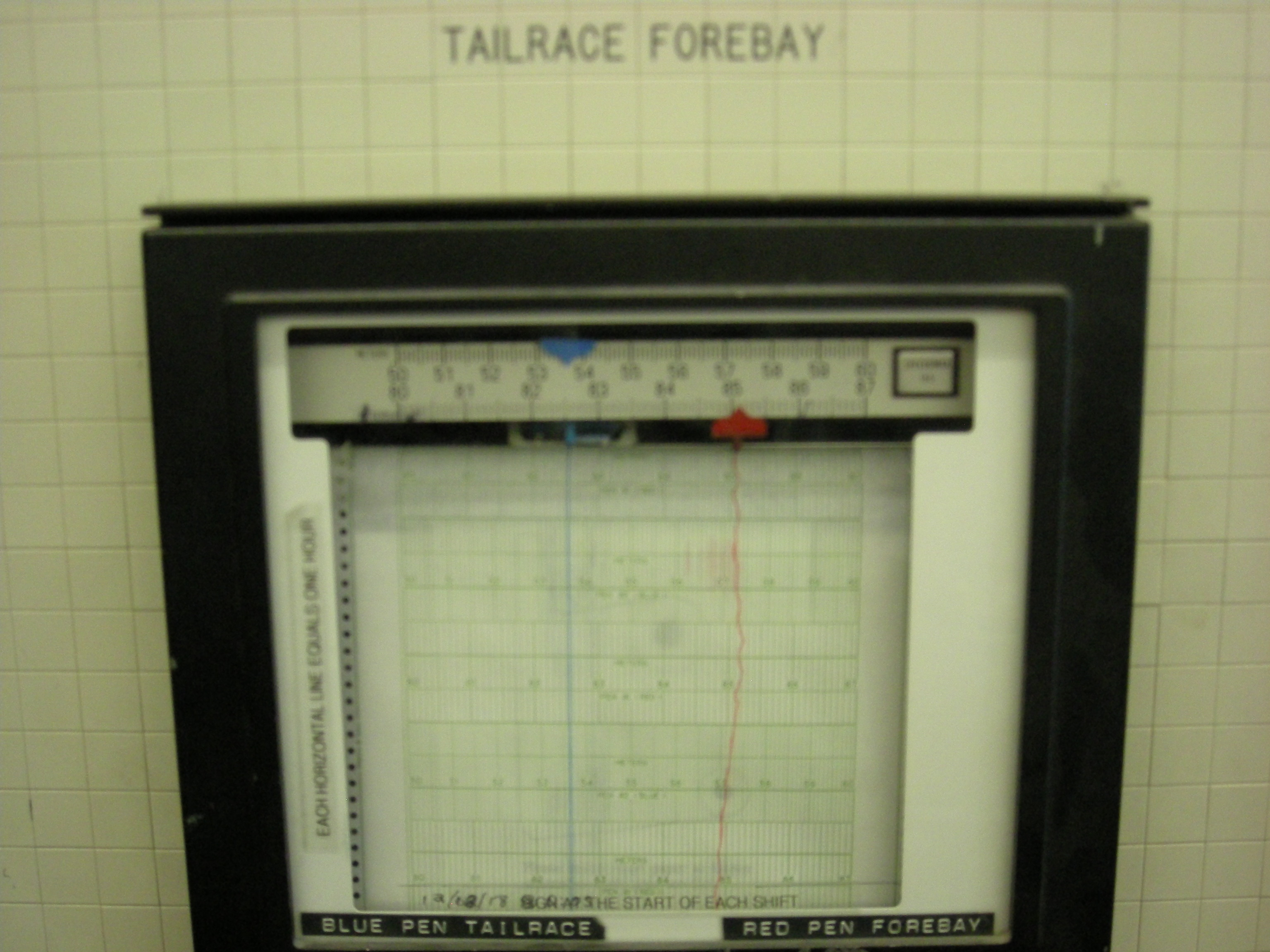
Measurement of the tailrace and forebay rates at the Limestone Generating Station in Manitoba, Canada

An underground power station is generally used at large facilities and makes use of a large natural height difference between two waterways, such as a waterfall or mountain lake. A tunnel is constructed to take water from the high reservoir to the generating hall built in a cavern near the lowest point of the water tunnel, and a horizontal tailrace takes water away to the lower outlet waterway.

=== Calculating available power ===
A simple formula for approximating electric power production at a hydroelectric station is:

$P = -\eta \ (\dot{m} g \ \Delta h) = -\eta \ ((\rho \dot{V}) \ g \ \Delta h)$

where

- $P$ is power (in watts)
- $\eta$ (eta) is the coefficient of efficiency (a unitless, scalar coefficient, ranging from 0 for completely inefficient to 1 for completely efficient).
- $\rho$ (rho) is the density of water (~1000 kg/m^{3})
- $\dot{V}$ is the volumetric flow rate (in m^{3}/s)
- $\dot{m}$ is the mass flow rate (in kg/s)
- $\Delta h$ (Delta h) is the change in height (in meters)
- $g$ is acceleration due to gravity (9.8 m/s^{2})

Efficiency is often higher (that is, closer to 1) with larger and more modern turbines. Annual electric energy production depends on the available water supply. In some installations, the water flow rate can vary by a factor of 10:1 over the course of a year.

== Properties ==
=== Advantages ===
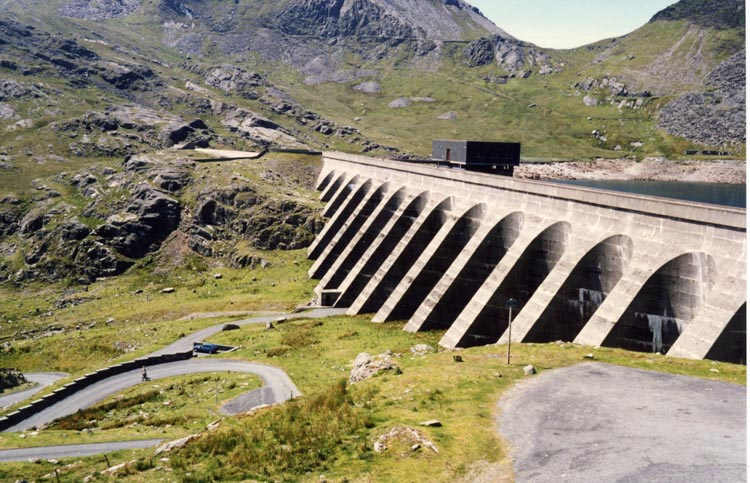
The Ffestiniog Power Station can generate 360 MW of electricity within 60 seconds of the demand arising.

==== Flexibility ====
Hydropower is a flexible source of electricity since stations can be ramped up and down very quickly to adapt to changing energy demands. Hydro turbines have a start-up time of the order of a few minutes. Although battery power is quicker its capacity is tiny compared to hydro. It takes less than 10 minutes to bring most hydro units from cold start-up to full load; this is quicker than nuclear and almost all fossil fuel power. Power generation can also be decreased quickly when there is a surplus power generation. Hence the limited capacity of hydropower units is not generally used to produce base power except for vacating the flood pool or meeting downstream needs. Instead, it can serve as backup for non-hydro generators.

==== High value power ====
The major advantage of conventional hydroelectric dams with reservoirs is their ability to store water at low cost for dispatch later as high-value clean electricity. In 2021, the IEA estimated that the "reservoirs of all existing conventional hydropower plants combined can store a total of 1,500 terawatt-hours (TWh) of electrical energy in one full cycle", which was "about 170 times more energy than the global fleet of pumped storage hydropower plants". Battery storage capacity is not expected to overtake pumped storage during the 2020s. When used as peak power to meet demand, hydroelectricity has a higher value than baseload power and a much higher value compared to intermittent energy sources such as wind and solar.

Hydroelectric stations have long economic lives, with some plants still in service after 50–100 years. Operating labor cost is also usually low, as plants are automated and have few personnel on site during normal operation.

Where a dam serves multiple purposes, a hydroelectric station may be added with relatively low construction cost, providing a useful revenue stream to offset the costs of dam operation. It has been calculated that the sale of electricity from the Three Gorges Dam will cover the construction costs after 5 to 8 years of full generation. However, some data shows that in most countries large hydropower dams will be too costly and take too long to build to deliver a positive risk adjusted return, unless appropriate risk management measures are put in place.

==== Suitability for industrial applications ====
While many hydroelectric projects supply public electricity networks, some are created to serve specific industrial enterprises. Dedicated hydroelectric projects are often built to provide the substantial amounts of electricity needed for aluminium electrolytic plants, for example. The Grand Coulee Dam switched to support Alcoa aluminium in Bellingham, Washington, United States for American World War II airplanes before it was allowed to provide irrigation and power to citizens (in addition to aluminium power) after the war. In Suriname, the Brokopondo Reservoir was constructed to provide electricity for the Alcoa aluminium industry. New Zealand's Manapouri Power Station was constructed to supply electricity to the aluminium smelter at Tiwai Point.

==== Reduced CO_{2} emissions ====
Since hydroelectric dams do not use fuel, power generation does not produce carbon dioxide. While carbon dioxide is initially produced during construction of the project, and some methane is given off annually by reservoirs, hydro has one of the lowest lifecycle greenhouse gas emissions for electricity generation. The low greenhouse gas impact of hydroelectricity is found especially in temperate climates. Greater greenhouse gas emission impacts are found in the tropical regions because the reservoirs of power stations in tropical regions produce a larger amount of methane than those in temperate areas.

Like other non-fossil fuel sources, hydropower also has no emissions of sulfur dioxide, nitrogen oxides, or other particulates.

==== Other uses of the reservoir ====
Reservoirs created by hydroelectric schemes often provide facilities for water sports, and become tourist attractions themselves. In some countries, aquaculture in reservoirs is common. Multi-use dams installed for irrigation support agriculture with a relatively constant water supply. Large hydro dams can control floods, which would otherwise affect people living downstream of the project. Managing dams which are also used for other purposes, such as irrigation, is complicated.

=== Disadvantages ===
In 2021, the IEA called for "robust sustainability standards for all hydropower development with streamlined rules and regulations".

==== Ecosystem damage and loss of land ====
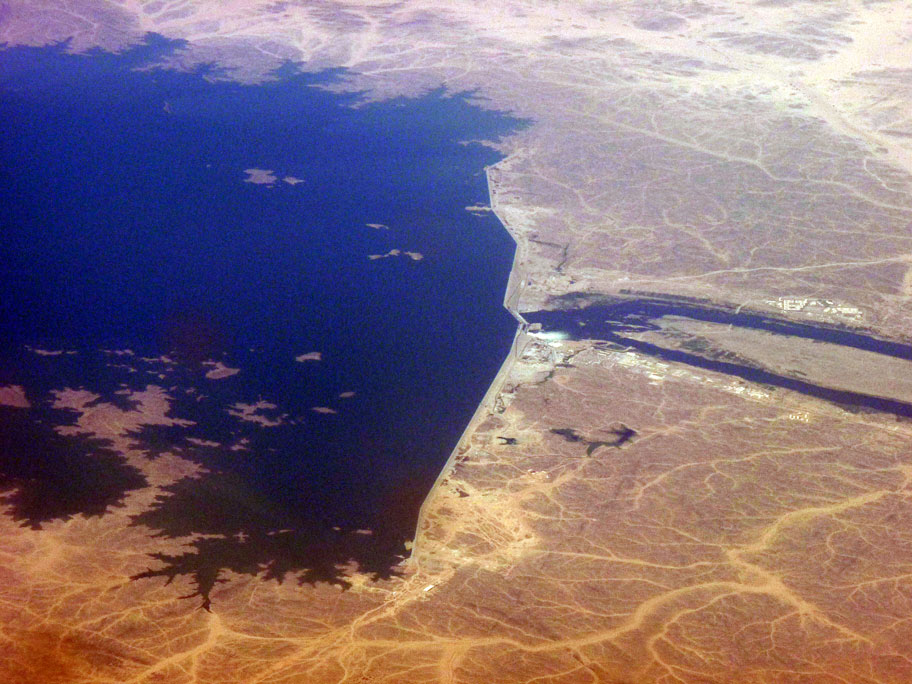
Merowe Dam in Sudan. Hydroelectric power stations that use dams submerge large areas of land due to the requirement of a reservoir. These changes to land color or albedo, alongside certain projects that concurrently submerge rainforests, can in these specific cases result in the global warming impact, or equivalent life-cycle greenhouse gases of hydroelectricity projects, to potentially exceed that of coal power stations.

Large reservoirs associated with traditional hydroelectric power stations result in submersion of extensive areas upstream of the dams, sometimes destroying biologically rich and productive lowland and riverine valley forests, marshland and grasslands. Damming interrupts the flow of rivers and can harm local ecosystems, and building large dams and reservoirs often involves displacing people and wildlife. The loss of land is often exacerbated by habitat fragmentation of surrounding areas caused by the reservoir.

Hydroelectric projects can be disruptive to surrounding aquatic ecosystems both upstream and downstream of the plant site. Generation of hydroelectric power changes the downstream river environment. Water exiting a turbine usually contains very little suspended sediment, which can lead to scouring of river beds and loss of riverbanks. The turbines also will kill large portions of the fauna passing through, for instance 70% of the eel passing a turbine will perish immediately. Since turbine gates are often opened intermittently, rapid or even daily fluctuations in river flow are observed.

==== Drought and water loss by evaporation ====
Drought and seasonal changes in rainfall can severely limit hydropower. Water may also be lost by evaporation.

==== Siltation and flow shortage ====
When water flows it has the ability to transport particles heavier than itself downstream. This has a negative effect on dams and subsequently their power stations, particularly those on rivers or within catchment areas with high siltation. Siltation can fill a reservoir and reduce its capacity to control floods along with causing additional horizontal pressure on the upstream portion of the dam. Eventually, some reservoirs can become full of sediment and useless or over-top during a flood and fail.

Changes in the amount of river flow will correlate with the amount of energy produced by a dam. Lower river flows will reduce the amount of live storage in a reservoir therefore reducing the amount of water that can be used for hydroelectricity. The result of diminished river flow can be power shortages in areas that depend heavily on hydroelectric power. The risk of flow shortage may increase as a result of climate change. One study from the Colorado River in the United States suggest that modest climate changes, such as an increase in temperature in 2 degree Celsius resulting in a 10% decline in precipitation, might reduce river run-off by up to 40%. Brazil in particular is vulnerable due to its heavy reliance on hydroelectricity, as increasing temperatures, lower water flow and alterations in the rainfall regime, could reduce total energy production by 7% annually by the end of the century.

==== Methane emissions (from reservoirs) ====
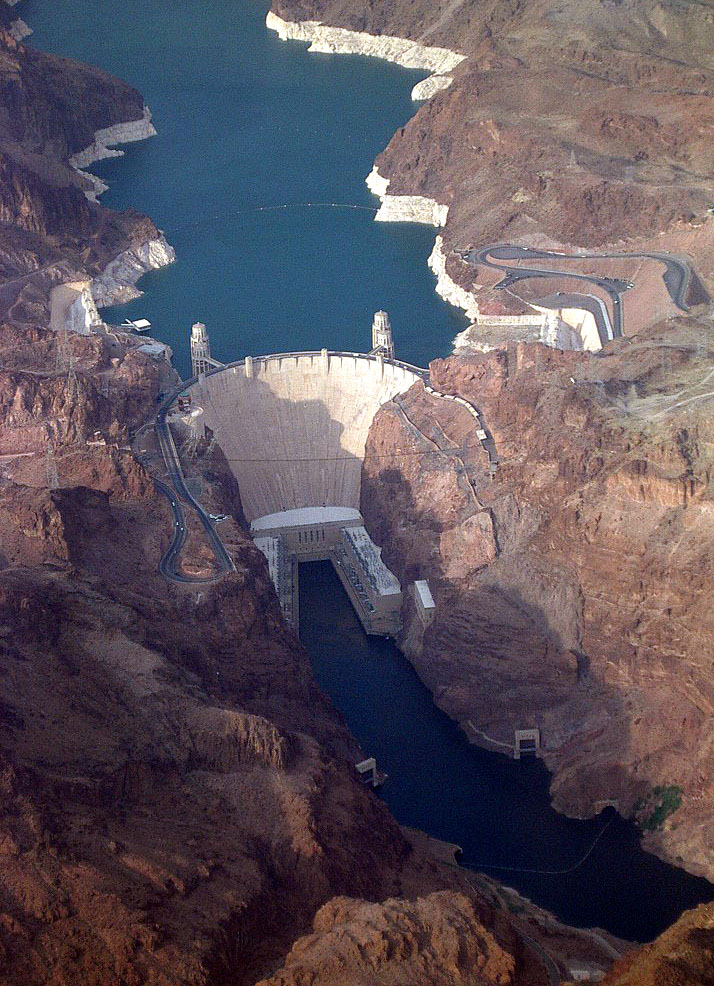
The Hoover Dam in the United States is a large conventional dammed-hydro facility, with an installed capacity of 2,080 MW.

Lower positive impacts are found in the tropical regions. In lowland rainforest areas, where inundation of a part of the forest is necessary, it has been noted that the reservoirs of power plants produce substantial amounts of methane. This is due to plant material in flooded areas decaying in an anaerobic environment and forming methane, a greenhouse gas. According to the World Commission on Dams report, where the reservoir is large compared to the generating capacity (less than 100 watts per square metre of surface area) and no clearing of the forests in the area was undertaken prior to impoundment of the reservoir, greenhouse gas emissions from the reservoir may be higher than those of a conventional oil-fired thermal generation plant.

In boreal reservoirs of Canada and Northern Europe, however, greenhouse gas emissions are typically only 2% to 8% of any kind of conventional fossil-fuel thermal generation. A new class of underwater logging operation that targets drowned forests can mitigate the effect of forest decay.

==== Relocation ====
Another disadvantage of hydroelectric dams is the need to relocate the people living where the reservoirs are planned. In 2000, the World Commission on Dams estimated that dams had physically displaced 40–80 million people worldwide.

==== Failure risks ====
Because large conventional dammed-hydro facilities hold back large volumes of water, a failure due to poor construction, natural disasters or sabotage can be catastrophic to downriver settlements and infrastructure.

During Typhoon Nina in 1975 Banqiao Dam in Southern China failed when more than a year's worth of rain fell within 24 hours (see 1975 Banqiao Dam failure). The resulting flood resulted in the deaths of 26,000 people, and another 145,000 from epidemics. Millions were left homeless.

The creation of a dam in a geologically inappropriate location may cause disasters such as 1963 disaster at Vajont Dam in Italy, where almost 2,000 people died.

The Malpasset Dam failure in Fréjus on the French Riviera (Côte d'Azur), southern France, collapsed on December 2, 1959, killing 423 people in the resulting flood.

Smaller dams and micro hydro facilities create less risk, but can form continuing hazards even after being decommissioned. For example, the small earthen embankment Kelly Barnes Dam failed in 1977, twenty years after its power station was decommissioned, causing 39 deaths.

=== Comparison and interactions with other methods of power generation ===
Hydroelectricity eliminates the flue gas emissions from fossil fuel combustion, including pollutants such as sulfur dioxide, nitric oxide, carbon monoxide, dust, and mercury in the coal. Hydroelectricity also avoids the hazards of coal mining and the indirect health effects of coal emissions. In 2021 the IEA said that government energy policy should "price in the value of the multiple public benefits provided by hydropower plants".

==== Nuclear power ====
Nuclear power is relatively inflexible; although it can reduce its output reasonably quickly. Since the cost of nuclear power is dominated by its high infrastructure costs, the cost per unit energy goes up significantly with low production. Because of this, nuclear power is mostly used for baseload. By way of contrast, hydroelectricity can supply peak power at much lower cost. Hydroelectricity is thus often used to complement nuclear or other sources for load following. Country examples where they are paired in a close to 50/50 share include the electric grid in Switzerland, the Electricity sector in Sweden and to a lesser extent, Ukraine and the Electricity sector in Finland.

==== Wind power ====
Wind power goes through predictable variation by season, but is intermittent on a daily basis. Maximum wind generation has little relationship to peak daily electricity consumption, the wind may peak at night when power is not needed or be still during the day when electrical demand is highest. Occasionally weather patterns can result in low wind for days or weeks at a time, a hydroelectric reservoir capable of storing weeks of output is useful to balance generation on the grid. Peak wind power can be offset by minimum hydropower and minimum wind can be offset with maximum hydropower. In this way the easily regulated character of hydroelectricity is used to compensate for the intermittent nature of wind power. Conversely, in some cases wind power can be used to spare water for later use in dry seasons.

An example of this is Norway's trading with Sweden, Denmark, the Netherlands, Germany and the UK. Norway is 98% hydropower, while its flatland neighbors have wind power. In areas that do not have hydropower, pumped storage serves a similar role, but at a much higher cost and 20% lower efficiency.

== Hydro power by country ==
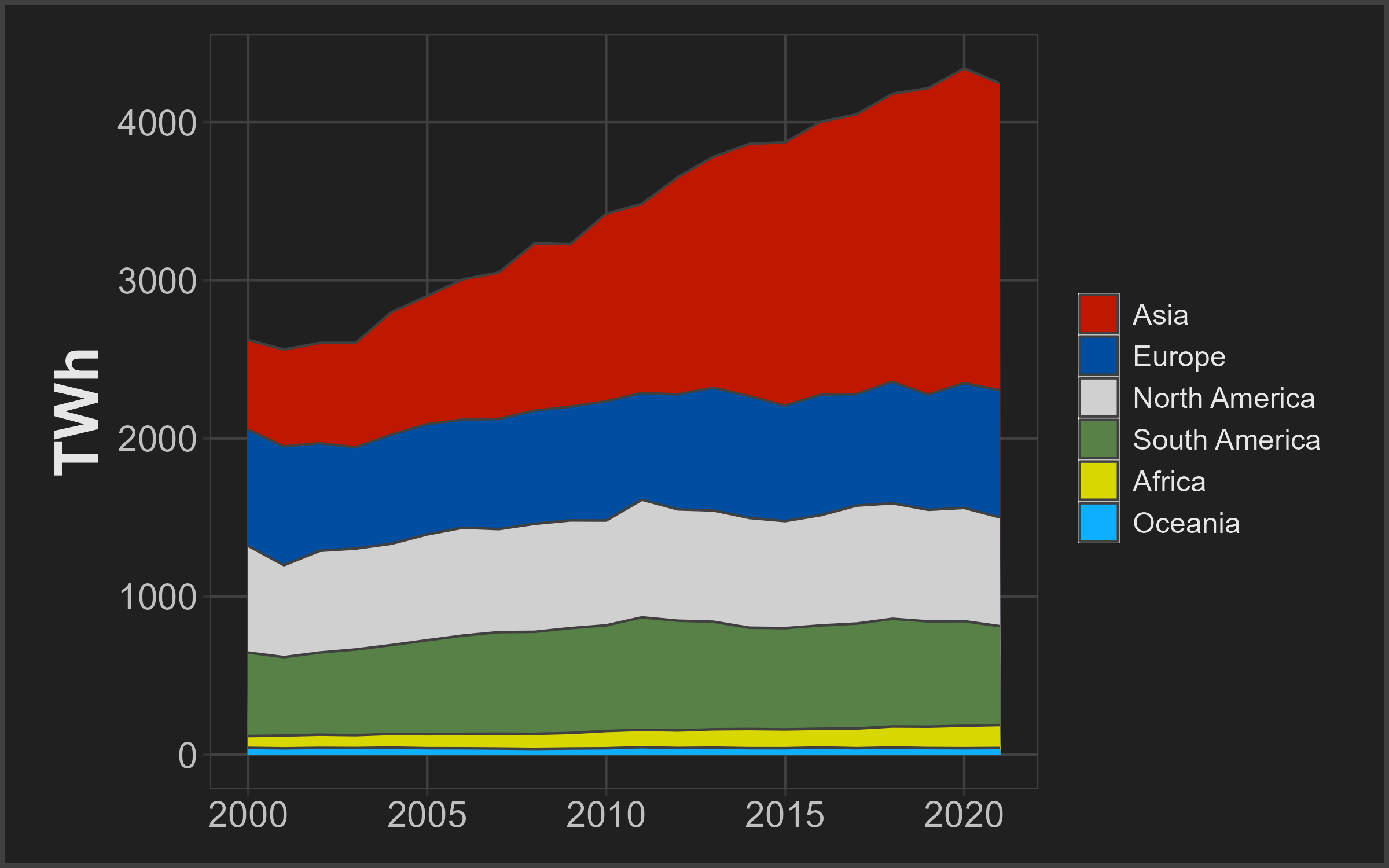
Yearly hydro generation by continent

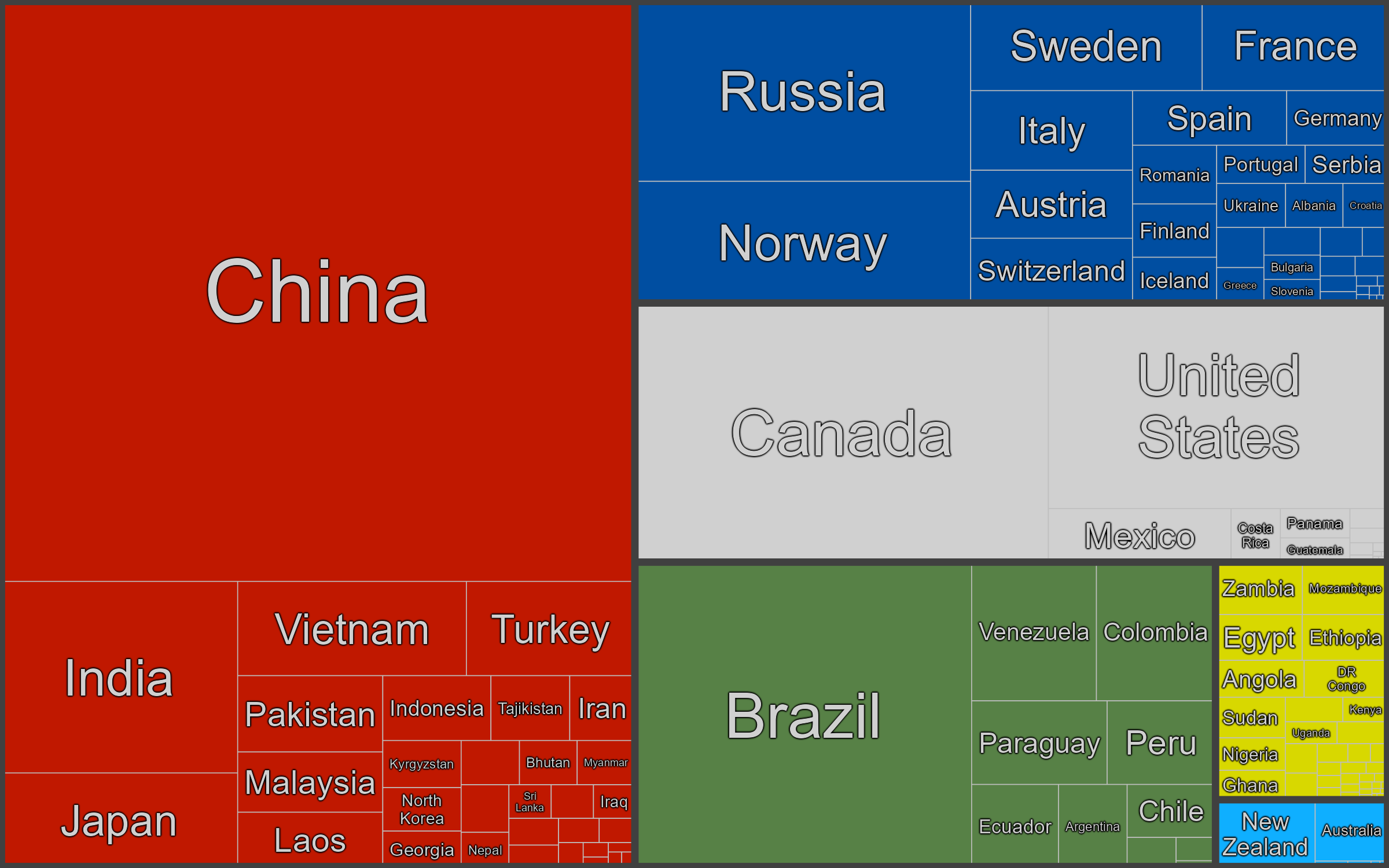
Hydro generation by country, 2021

In 2022, hydro generated 4,289 TWh, 15% of total electricity and half of renewables. Of the world total, China (30%) produced the most, followed by Brazil (10%), Canada (9.2%), the United States (5.8%) and Russia (4.6%).

Paraguay produces nearly all of its electricity from hydro and exports far more than it uses. Larger plants tend to be built and operated by national governments, so most capacity (70%) is publicly owned, despite the fact that most plants (nearly 70%) are owned and operated by the private sector, as of 2021.

The following table lists these data for each country:

- total generation from hydro in terawatt-hours,
- percent of that country's generation that was hydro,
- total hydro capacity in gigawatts,
- percent growth in hydro capacity, and
- the hydro capacity factor for that year.

Data are sourced from Ember dating to the year 2023 unless otherwise specified. Only includes countries with more than 1 TWh of generation. Links for each location go to the relevant hydro power page, when available.

Country	Gen (TWh)	% gen.	Cap. (GW)	% cap. growth	Cap. fac.
World	4183.41	14.2	1267.90	0.6	38%
China	1226.00	13.0	370.60	0.8	38%
Brazil	428.65	60.4	109.90	0.1	50%
Canada	364.20	57.5	83.31	0.0	50%
United States	233.96	5.5	86.66	0.0	31%
Russia	200.87	17.1	50.57	-1.6	45%
India	149.17	7.6	47.33	0.2	36%
Norway	135.96	88.5	34.40	0.4	45%
Vietnam	80.90	29.3	22.64	0.5	41%
Japan	74.50	7.4	28.22	0.1	30%
Sweden	66.07	39.7	16.40	0.0	46%
Venezuela (2022)	65.68	77.6	16.81	0.0	45%
Turkey	63.72	19.9	31.78	0.7	23%
Colombia	54.24	62.5	13.21	5.3	47%
France	53.19	10.4	24.14	-0.4	25%
Paraguay (2022)	43.87	99.7	8.81	0.0	57%
Austria	39.79	59.4	14.71	-1.4	31%
Switzerland	39.00	54.8	15.28	1.4	29%
Italy	37.94	14.5	18.85	-0.4	23%
Pakistan	37.90	23.5	10.64	0.0	41%
Laos (2022)	33.40	72.7	9.65	7.7	40%
Malaysia	31.51	16.8	6.21	0.0	58%
Peru	31.51	52.6	5.50	0.0	65%
Argentina	29.90	20.4	10.39	0.0	33%
Ecuador	26.61	76.4	5.19	0.0	59%
New Zealand	26.04	58.5	5.68	0.0	52%
Indonesia	24.59	7.0	6.78	1.3	41%
Chile	23.90	28.6	7.47	2.5	37%
Iran	22.65	5.9	11.68	1.6	22%
Mexico	20.40	5.8	13.30	0.0	18%
Spain	20.01	7.4	16.81	0.0	14%
Germany	19.47	3.9	5.74	2.1	39%
Tajikistan (2022)	18.66	89.4	5.76	0.3	37%
Romania	18.30	32.5	6.57	0.0	32%
Zambia (2022)	17.09	87.8	3.17	17.0	62%
Mozambique (2022)	15.49	81.4	2.19	0.0	81%
Australia	15.26	5.6	8.44	9.5	21%
Finland	15.11	18.9	3.18	0.3	54%
Ethiopia (2022)	14.75	95.7	4.82	18.4	35%
Iceland (2022)	13.94	70.2	2.11	0.0	75%
Egypt	13.82	6.3	2.83	0.0	56%
North Korea (2022)	12.82	57.5	4.89	0.6	30%
Angola (2022)	12.64	74.6	3.73	0.0	39%
Serbia	12.19	32.0	2.49	0.0	56%
Kyrgyzstan (2022)	11.90	85.9	2.78	0.0	49%
Ukraine (2022)	11.10	9.9	4.82	0.0	26%
DR Congo (2022)	11.00	99.6	2.93	12.3	43%
Sudan (2022)	11.00	61.6	1.48	0.0	85%
Portugal	10.98	24.5	8.19	0.0	15%
Georgia	10.85	75.5	3.45	2.1	36%
Nepal (2022)	9.67	98.5	2.20	11.7	50%
Myanmar	9.37	51.6	3.27	0.0	33%
Panama (2022)	9.24	69.2	1.84	1.7	57%
Philippines	9.08	7.7	3.09	1.6	34%
Bhutan (2022)	9.00	100.0	2.33	0.0	44%
Kazakhstan	8.79	7.8	2.90	3.2	35%
Costa Rica	8.45	70.5	2.37	1.7	41%
Nigeria	8.28	20.4	2.85	32.6	33%
Croatia	7.87	46.5	2.21	0.0	41%
Ghana (2022)	7.50	33.3	1.58	0.0	54%
Albania (2022)	6.96	99.4	2.49	-0.8	32%
Thailand	6.59	3.5	3.11	0.0	24%
Bosnia and Herzegovina	6.37	37.4	1.84	0.0	40%
Zimbabwe (2022)	5.88	65.9	1.08	0.0	62%
United Kingdom	5.19	1.8	2.19	0.0	27%
Sri Lanka (2022)	5.11	29.4	1.83	1.7	32%
Guatemala (2022)	5.08	38.6	1.57	0.0	37%
Cameroon (2022)	5.00	61.6	0.81	0.0	70%
Uzbekistan (2022)	4.97	6.7	2.23	8.8	25%
Slovenia	4.96	32.6	1.16	-0.9	49%
Uganda (2022)	4.81	89.2	1.03	2.0	53%
Slovakia	4.63	15.6	1.62	0.0	33%
Cambodia (2022)	4.00	45.4	1.68	26.3	27%
Honduras (2022)	4.00	33.3	0.91	7.1	50%
Taiwan	3.96	1.4	2.10	0.0	22%
Greece	3.87	7.8	3.43	0.3	13%
Latvia	3.80	60.8	1.57	-1.3	28%
South Korea	3.72	0.6	1.80	-0.6	24%
Uruguay	3.62	27.4	1.54	0.0	27%
Ivory Coast (2022)	3.35	30.1	0.88	0.0	43%
Bulgaria	3.11	7.8	2.53	0.0	14%
Tanzania (2022)	2.82	31.3	0.60	1.7	54%
Kenya	2.70	22.1	0.86	0.0	36%
Iraq (2022)	2.65	2.3	1.56	0.0	19%
Poland	2.38	1.4	0.98	0.0	28%
Czech Republic	2.34	3.1	1.12	0.9	24%
Bolivia	2.31	19.0	0.74	0.0	36%
Montenegro	2.13	52.1	0.70	0.0	35%
Armenia (2022)	2.00	22.8	1.35	0.0	17%
Guinea (2022)	2.00	65.8	0.81	37.3	28%
South Africa	1.69	0.7	0.75	0.0	26%
North Macedonia	1.65	23.5	0.70	0.0	27%
El Salvador	1.62	21.8	0.57	0.0	32%
Azerbaijan (2022)	1.60	5.5	1.16	0.0	16%
Mali (2022)	1.40	37.3	0.46	43.8	35%
Malawi (2022)	1.05	77.8	0.39	0.0	31%
Dominican Republic (2022)	1.00	4.6	0.62	0.0	18%

== Economics ==
The development of hydropower projects typically includes high costs of setting up due to requirement of intense labour and expense on plant and machinery. Conducting analysis of the impact of hydropower generation and compensating for any negative impacts also adds up to the final cost.

Though total greenfield hydropower investment typically costs between USD 1,200/Kw and USD 4,500/Kw, the range can be much wider for large-scale hydropower plants, ranging from 1,000/Kw to 10,000/Kw, according to IEA report 2021 on hydropower generation.

Due to high population and availability of cheap labour, countries in the Asia Pacific, such as India and China have the lowest overall hydropower investment costs. On the other hand, countries in Europe and North America have the highest hydropower investment costs due to expensive labour. In Africa, the major issue is the backward technology and infrastructure which is not compatible for hydro-power generation.

Capital costs usually make-up 80-90% of hydropower's levelised cost of energy (LCOE). Operations and maintenance (O&M) account for the remainder, which on average amounts to about 2% of the initial investment cost. Project development costs and expected returns on investment, expressed as the weighted average cost of capital is a major factor.

== See also ==
- Energy transition
- Hydraulic engineering
- International Hydropower Association
- International Rivers
- List of energy storage power plants
- List of hydroelectric power station failures
- List of largest power stations
- List of renewable energy topics by country and territory
- Lists of hydroelectric power stations
- Marine current power – electricity from sea currents
- National Hydropower Association (US)
- Run-of-the-river hydroelectricity

== Sources ==
- Kuriqi, Alban; Jurasz, Jakub (2022). "Small hydropower plants proliferation and fluvial ecosystem conservation nexus". Complementarity of Variable Renewable Energy Sources. Elsevier. doi:10.1016/b978-0-323-85527-3.00027-3. ISBN 978-0-323-85527-3.
