= Korea District Heating Corporation =

South Korean heating company

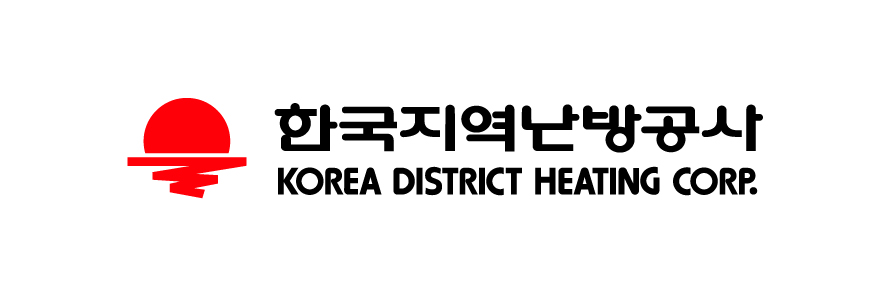
- Logo of KDHC
- Native name: 한국지역난방공사
- Type: Public; State-owned
- Traded as: KRX: 071320
- Founded: 1985; 41 years ago
- Headquarters: Seongnam, South Korea
- Key people: Ha Dong-Geun (President & CEO)
- Owner: MOTIE
- Website: kdhc.co.kr

- Korea District Heating Corporation
- Hangul: 한국지역난방공사
- Hanja: 韓國地域暖房公社
- RR: Hanguk jiyeongnanbang gongsa
- MR: Han'guk chiyŏngnanbang kongsa

The Korea District Heating Corporation (KDHC; Korean: 한국지역난방공사) is a South Korean district heating company with its main office in Seongnam, South Korea. It was established as a statutory corporation in 1985 "for the purpose of dealing effectively with the United Nations Framework Convention on Climate Change by promoting energy conservation and improving living standards through the efficient use of district heating". It supplied district heating services to 1.3 million South Korean households as of 2015.

== See also ==
- Energy in South Korea
