= Wind power in South Korea =

Wind power is a form of renewable energy in South Korea with the goal of reducing greenhouse gas (GHG) and particulate matter (PM) emissions caused by coal-based power. After two oil crises dating back to the 1970s, the South Korean government needed to transition to renewable energy, which encouraged their first renewable energy law in 1987.

By the end of 2022, South Korea's cumulative wind power capacity had reached 1,809 MW, generating about 3.35 TWh, or roughly 0.6% of the country's electricity consumption. Wind power accounted for about 1% of total installed power generation capacity and 0.7% of total power generation in 2023. In 2019, South Korea led an initiative in creating energy transition policies, which incorporated wind power along with de-fossil and de-nuclear in the Renewable Energy 2030 Plan.

With wind power being the fastest growing power source in South Korea, the Korean government's plan was to invest $8.2 billion into offshore wind farms in order to increase the total capacity to 2.5 GW until 2019. In April 2020, the government announced the "Korean Green New Deal" which includes plans to drastically increase wind power through the expansion of domestic wind power facilities to include 8 MW offshore wind turbines by 2022 and floating offshore wind systems by 2025.

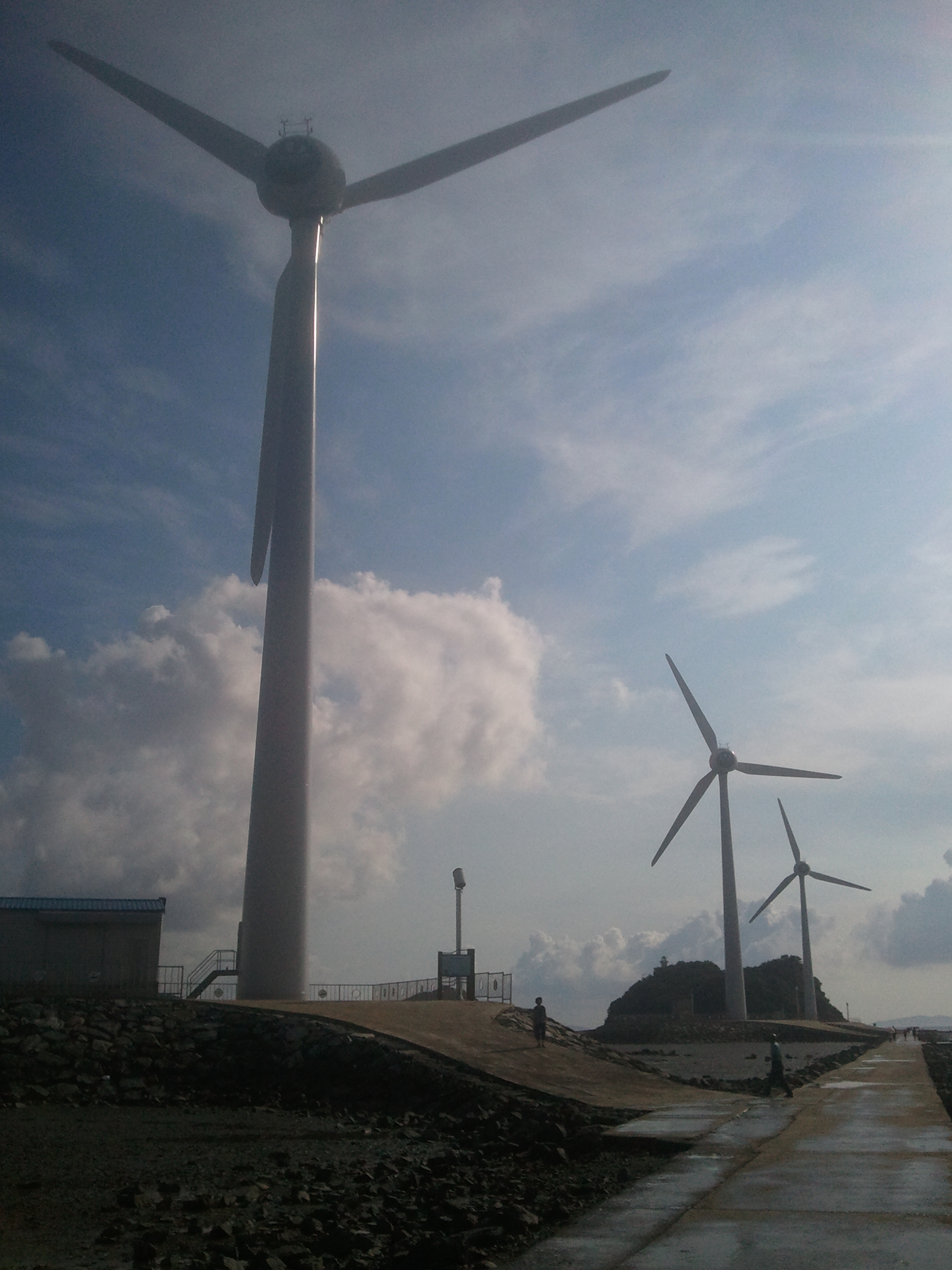
Wind power generators on Daebudo

Most wind farms are in the province of Gangwon and Jeju Island because they have mountainous areas with high winds with speeds above 7.5 m/s. Compared to these mountainous areas, the city of Seoul has a much lower wind speed, as its highest average wind speed is 2.85 m/s.

Wind farms have received pushback in South Korea due to overlap with fishery and military zones.

== Limitations ==
There are economic and usage limitations that inhibit the widespread use of wind power. The cost of wind energy is higher than that of conventional energy sources. Many wind farm owners are not satisfied with the service of large manufacturing companies like Vestas US for its high cost. Vestas, a turbine manufacturer, holds a 42.2% market share in the Korean wind energy industry. Shifting the reliance on large corporate manufacturers to local turbine manufacturers may help reduce costs. There are also costs to transmitting energy from offshore wind farms to destinations. Since wind is not a consistent source of energy and can be affected by climate conditions, wind powered systems need to be accompanied by other energy sources to provide uninterrupted power supply.

== Projects ==
The Singapore-based subsea engineering company, G8, received approval to build a 1.5GW offshore wind farm in late December 2021. The project is planned to be built off the south-west tip of South Korea with the build site having recorded wind speeds of 7–8 m/s. Current plans are to begin construction, as well as marine works in 2023 or 2024. The project also involves the use of an advanced, long-life lithium-ion energy storage system from 3DOM, a technology partner of G8.

=== FireFly Floating Wind Farm Project ===
The Firefly Floating Wind Farm Project, which is under development by Equinor South Korea, is part of the Ulsan floating offshore wind project. A memorandum of understanding was signed between Equinor and Ulsan City in May 2019, entailing the two 75 square kilometer areas 800 MW wind farm offshore of Ulsan. The wind farm will include "Wind Semis" as the floating structure, characterized by a semi-submersible foundation allowing for the floatation of the turbines compared to bottom-fixed turbines.

Two LiDAR buoys were placed in the Sea of Japan of Ulsan serving to collect measurements of wind and wave for a year in 2020 to investigate the possibility of the development and construction of the wind farm in the coat of Ulsan. This was followed after the signing of MoU between the Ulsan and Equinor. The goal expected to be met by the creation of these wind farms is to increase South Korea's renewable energy by 30 times by the year 2035.

Data was collected for the Environmental Impact Assessment (EIA) starting in December 2021 for a period of 12 months. This data includes data on marine animals, fish, seawater, and the quality of sediment among other data to note any potential impacts that can be caused by the building and running of the Firefly wind farms. The report was completed and published at the beginning half of the year 2022.

Havfram was appointed to study the transport, installation and supplying of necessary cables and systems offshore for the windshore project by Equinor in March 2022.

Technip Energies was selected in April 2022 to conduct a Front-End Engineering Design, or FEED, of the wind turbines for the floating project Technip Energies plants to include the use of their INO15™ technology, with a 15 MG capacity. A Denmark-based company, COWI, has been appointed as Owner's Engineer by Equinor in November 2022 for the Firefly wind project. This will include management and engineering services to Equinor. The contract will continue for the period of the Firefly offshore wind project.

South Korea's Geoview was also selected in early 2022 for the task of surveying and mapping the subsea geophysical of the wind site. As of December 5, 2022, Geoview has completed the surveying for marine geophysical exploration in Ulsan through the use of its marine vessel Geoview No 1 to obtain seabed topography of mapping of the area.

=== Hanwha E&C and Equinor Projects ===
In November 2022 the two companies Hanwha Engineering and Construction (Hanwha E&C) and Equinor signed a Memorandum of understanding. This MoU entailing the two companies will work together in the building of offshore forms that Hanwha E&C has been appointed to build.

Building projects from the company are expected to be built in Shinhan, Goheung, and Yeonggwang in South Jeolla, Boryeon in South Chungcheong including the regions of Yeongcheon and Yeongwol. Similar to the Gray Whale 3 Project the Shinhan project will be set up in phases and expected to be completed in 2030. It is estimated that the 8.2 GW Shinan wind farm can provide for the populations of both Seoul and Incheon and is a part of South Korea's former President Moon Jae-In's Green New Deal.

=== BadaEnergy Portfolio ===
As of September 6, 2022, Corio Generation and TotalEnergies joined SK Ecoplant to expand the BadaEnergy in the provinces of South Jeolla and the coasts of Ulsan. The BadaEnergy will include the addition of 2GW wind farms, both floating and fixed bottom off-shore. This also consists of the Gray Whale 1.5 GW three-phase Project floating project, which is anticipated to be the most extensive floating offshore provision. Among the other projects obtained through the stake are the 500 MW Jindo and 500 MW Geomundo in South Korea. The partnership is expected to create jobs for the country and supply green energy at a competitive price through the development of 504 MW wind farms. This wind farm is to be South Korea's first commercial floating farm.

With this partnership, SK Ecoplant will assist its partners with organizing, licensing, and construction. Of the BadaEnergy portfolio, four of the five projects have received electric business licenses (EBLs) from the Ministry of Trade, Industry, and Energy's Electricity Regulatory Commission. This license requires the project's completion of the commissioning of electrical installation and generation business within the period stated within the permit. With the development rights of the majority of the projects obtained the partners are advancing the first commercial operation day by 2027.

==== Gray Whale 3 ====
Donghae Gray Whale 3 consists of one of the projects that will be completed due to the association between Corio and Total Energies expected to have a capacity of 1.5 GW. This project was named after Okhotsk-Korean Gray Whale, to symbolize South Korea's hope to reinstate the environment in hopes of the gray whales return to Korea. This project will be built 70 kilometers from the coast of Ulsan consisting of floating offshore wind farms, at a depth of 150 meters. The projects will have a capacity of around 500 MW and id expected to be functioning by the end of 2026^{[3]}.

A consortium of DORIS and Hyundai Heavy Industries has been appointed as the Front-End Engineering Design (FEED) by Corio and Total Energies for the Gray Whale Project. The design and installation of the turbines are a few of the tasks that will be entrusted to the consortium. The association plans on improving the Hi-Float design to be able to harbor Tecnip Energies' in-house floater technology INO15, which will also be used for this project. Technnip alongside Subsea 7, and Samkang M&T undertook the studying of engineering in August 2022 for the floating offshore wind project.

In November 2020, Bureau Veritas alongside Korean Register (KR) was designated to lead the certification of the project. This includes the evaluations of the project's design manufacturing and operations among other assessments needed for the completion of the wind farm. The certifications are needed to ensure the project is running in accordance with both domestic and international standards.

== Government policies ==
The South Korean government's Ministry of Trade, Industry and Energy promulgated "The 9th Basic Plan for Power Demand and Supply" (commonly known as the "Korean New Green Deal") in 2020, which includes plans to increase wind power from "1,834 MW in 2020 to 17,679 MW by 2030 and 24,874 MW by 2034." Development has slowed in some areas due to resistance from local residents.

== Statistics ==
Installed wind power capacity in South Korea and generation in recent years is shown in the table below:

Year	2004	2005	2006	2007	2008	2009	2010	2011	2012	2013	2014	2015	2016	2017	2022
Capacity (MW)	65.7	183.6	190.0	192.7	298.0	333.3	366.7	418.7	491.5	583.4	644.7	852.5	1,034.6	1,143	1,809
Generation (GW·h)	47.4	129.8	238.9	375.6	436.0	685.3	816.9	862.8	912.7	1,148.1	1,145.5	1,342.4	1,683.1	2,169	3,348

2022 figures (cumulative capacity 1,809 MW; generation 3,348 GWh) are from the IEA Wind TCP.

== See also ==
- Energy in South Korea
- Renewable energy in South Korea
- Solar power in South Korea
- Renewable energy by country
