= Energy in South Korea =

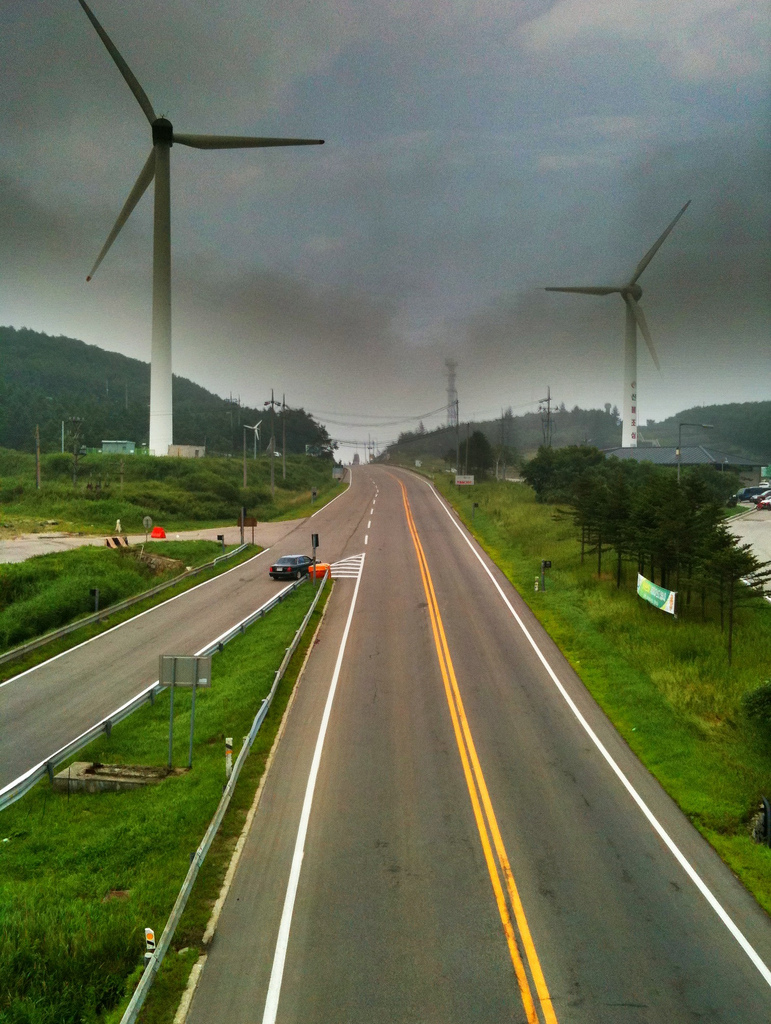
Yongpyeong wind farm

South Korea is a major energy importer, importing nearly all of its oil needs and ranking as the third-largest importer of liquefied natural gas in the world in 2024. Electricity generation in the country mainly comes from conventional thermal power, which accounts for more than two thirds of production, and from nuclear power.

Energy producers were dominated by government enterprises, although privately operated coal mines and oil refineries also existed. The National Assembly enacted a broad electricity sector restructuring program in 2000, but the restructuring process was halted amid political controversy in 2004 and remains a topic of intense political debate.

South Korea has no proven oil reserves. Exploration until the 1980s in the Yellow Sea and on the continental shelf between Korea and Japan did not find any offshore oil. The Donghae-1 gas field produced natural gas between 2004 and 2021, and natural gas exploration off the east coast was started in 2024.

Coal supply in the country is insufficient and of low quality. The potential for hydroelectric power is limited because of high seasonal variations in the weather and the concentration of most of the rainfall in the summer. As of 2017, South Korean President Moon Jae-in has vowed to end the country’s reliance on coal and also said the nation would move away from nuclear energy. He has taken a major step in that direction in June, saying his country would not try to extend the life of its nuclear plants, would close existing coal-fired plants, and would not build any new coal plants.

In recent years, South Korea has set a new direction for its energy sector, with significant decarbonization goals, aiming to raise the share of electricity from renewable sources from 6% in 2019 to 35% by 2030.

== History ==
Energy in South Korea, in TWh
	Nuclear	Coal	LNG	Renewable (PV & Wind)	Oil	Pumped Storage	Others	Total
2018	133.5 (23.4%)	239.0 (41.9%)	152.9 (26.8%)	35.6 (6.2%)	5.7 (1.0%)	4.0 (0.7%)	9.7 (1.7%)	570.7
2021	158.0 (27.4%)	198.0 (34.3%)	168.4 (29.2%)	43.1 (7.5%)	2.4 (0.4%)	3.7 (0.6%)	9.4 (1.6%)	577.5
2022	176.1 (29.6%)	193.2 (32.5%)	163.6 (27.5%)	53.2 (8.9%)	2.0 (0.3%)	3.7 (0.6%)	2.7 (0.5%)	594.4
2023	180.5 (30.7%)	184.9 (31.4%)	157.7 (26.8%)	56.6 (9.6%)	1.5 (0.3%)	3.8 (0.6%)	3.0 (0.5%)	588.0
2024	188.8 (31.7%)	167.2 (28.1%)	167.2 (28.1%)	63.2 (10.5%)	1.2 (0.2%)	4.7 (0.8%)	3.4 (0.6%)	595.6

== Overview ==
Energy-consumption-by-source, South Korea

Final energy consumption by source (2010):

- Coal: 27.6 Mtoe (million tonne of oil equivalent) (14.2%)
- Petroleum: 100.5 Mtoe (51.6%)
- LNG: 21.9 Mtoe (11.3%)
- Electricity: 37.3 Mtoe (19.2%)
- Heat: 1.7 Mtoe (0.9%)
- Renewable: 5.8 Mtoe (3%)

Energy in South Korea
	Capita	Prim. energy	Production	Import	Electricity	CO_{2}-emission
	Million	TWh	TWh	TWh	TWh	Mt
2004	48.08	2,478	442	2,140	355	462
2007	48.46	2,584	494	2,213	412	489
2008	48.61	2,639	520	2,269	430	501
2009	48.75	2,665	515	2,304	438	515
2010	48.88	2,908	522	2,571	481	563
2012	49.78	3,029	546	2,644	506	588
2012R	50.00	3,064	538	2,659	517	593
2013	50.22	3,068	507	2,723	524	572
Change 2004-10	1.7%	17.3%	18.1%	20.1%	35.5%	21.9%
Mtoe = 11.63 TWh, Prim. energy includes energy losses that are 2/3 for nuclear power 2012R = CO2 calculation criteria changed, numbers updated

== Electric power ==
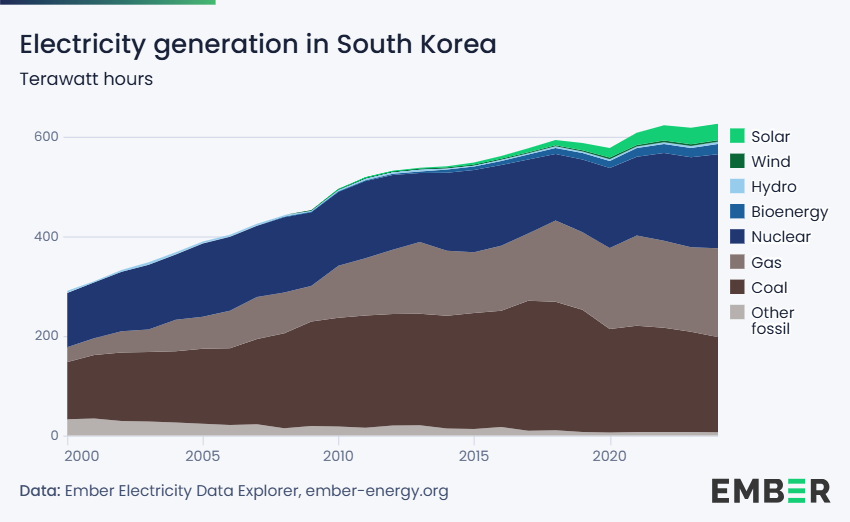
Electricity generation in South Korea - terawatt hours

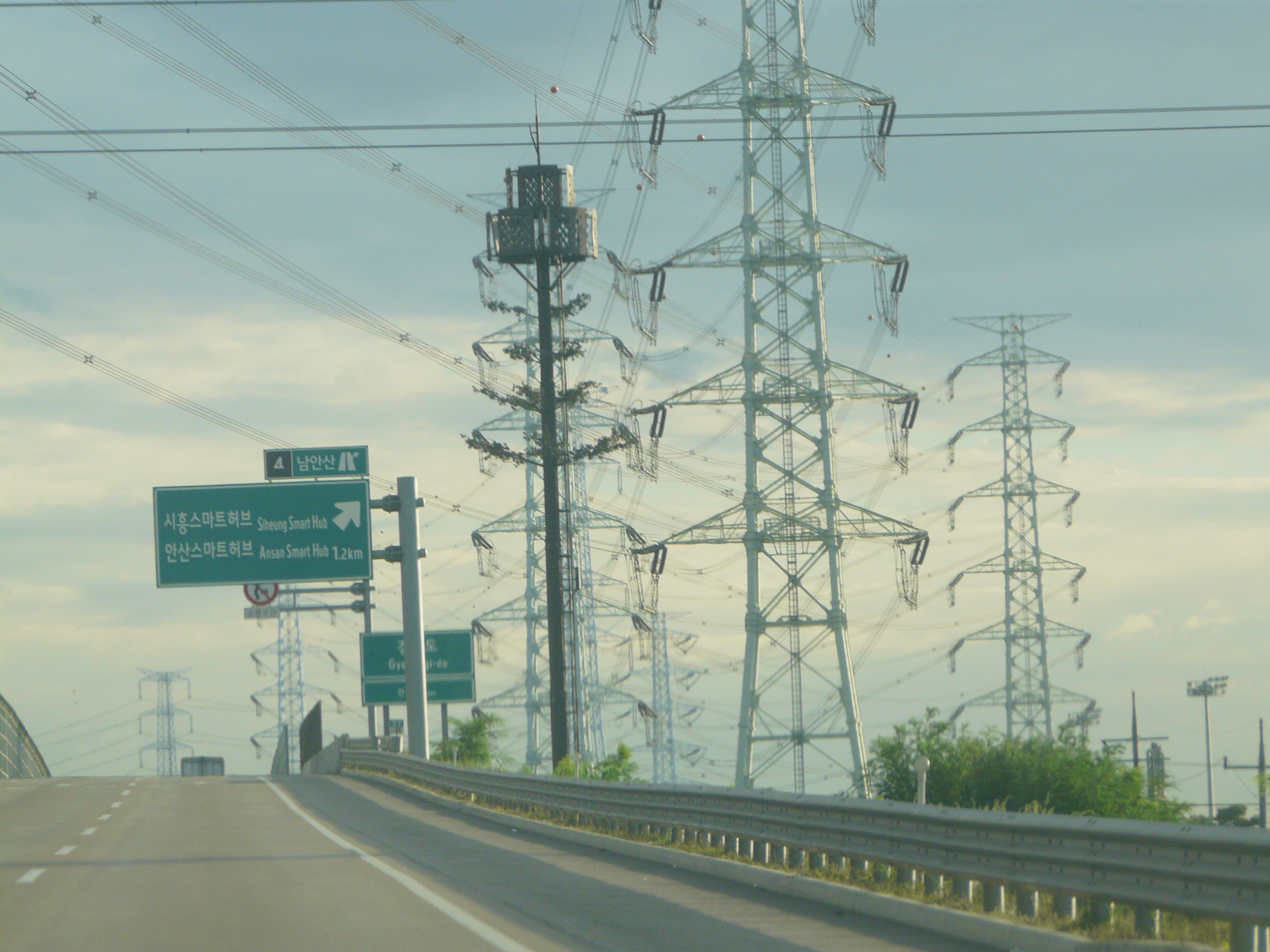
Siheung, Gyeonggi

=== History ===
The Korea Electric Power Corporation (KEPCO) provided electricity in the country. When KEPCO's predecessor, KECO, was founded in 1961, annual power production was 1,770 GWh. Production reached 73,992 GWh in 1987. In that year, residential customers used 17.9% of total production, public and service businesses used 16.2%, and the industrial sector used 65.9%. Sources of power generation were primarily nuclear power, coal, oil, and liquefied natural gas. Of the 54,885 GWh of electricity generated in 1985, 22% came from nuclear plants then in operation, 74% from non-nuclear thermal plants (oil and coal), and 4% from hydroelectric sites. It was predicted in 1988 that the generation structure by the year 2000 would be 10.2% hydroelectric, 12.2% oil, 22.9% coal, 10.2% LNG, and 44.5% nuclear.

In 2025, South Korea had 156.6 GW of installed electricity generation capacity. Gas-fired capacity was the largest at 45.2 GW, followed by coal at about 40 GW and nuclear power at 26.1 GW.

=== Statistics ===
Electricity production in South Korea, GWh
Source	2008	2009	2010	2011
Thermal	264,747 (62.7%)	278,400 (64.2%)	315,608 (66.5%)	324,354 (65.3%)
Nuclear	150,958 (35.7%)	147,771 (34.1%)	148,596 (31.3%)	154,723 (31.1%)
Hydro	5,561 (1.3%)	5,641 (1.3%)	6,472 (1.4%)	7,831 (1.6%)
Other	1,090 (0.3%)	1,791 (0.4%)	3,984 (0.8%)	9,985 (2.0%)
Total	422,355	433,604	474,660	496,893

== Sources ==
=== Thermal ===
- KEPCO (한국전력공사) controls 5 regional gencos who sell via KPX to the grid:
- Korea East-West Power (한국동서발전㈜)
- Korea Midland Power (한국중부발전㈜)
- Korea South-Eastern Power (한국남동발전㈜)
- Korea Southern Power (한국남부발전㈜)
- Korea Western Power (한국서부발전㈜)

KOGAS (한국가스공사) acts as importer of LNG for the power generators.

=== Cogeneration and steam-heating ===
- Korea District Heating Corporation (KDHC, 한국지역난방공사㈜) supplies steam and CHP to the Seoul area and Daegu. GS Power and SH Corp are local providers. KDHC is the world's largest district heating company.

=== Nuclear power ===
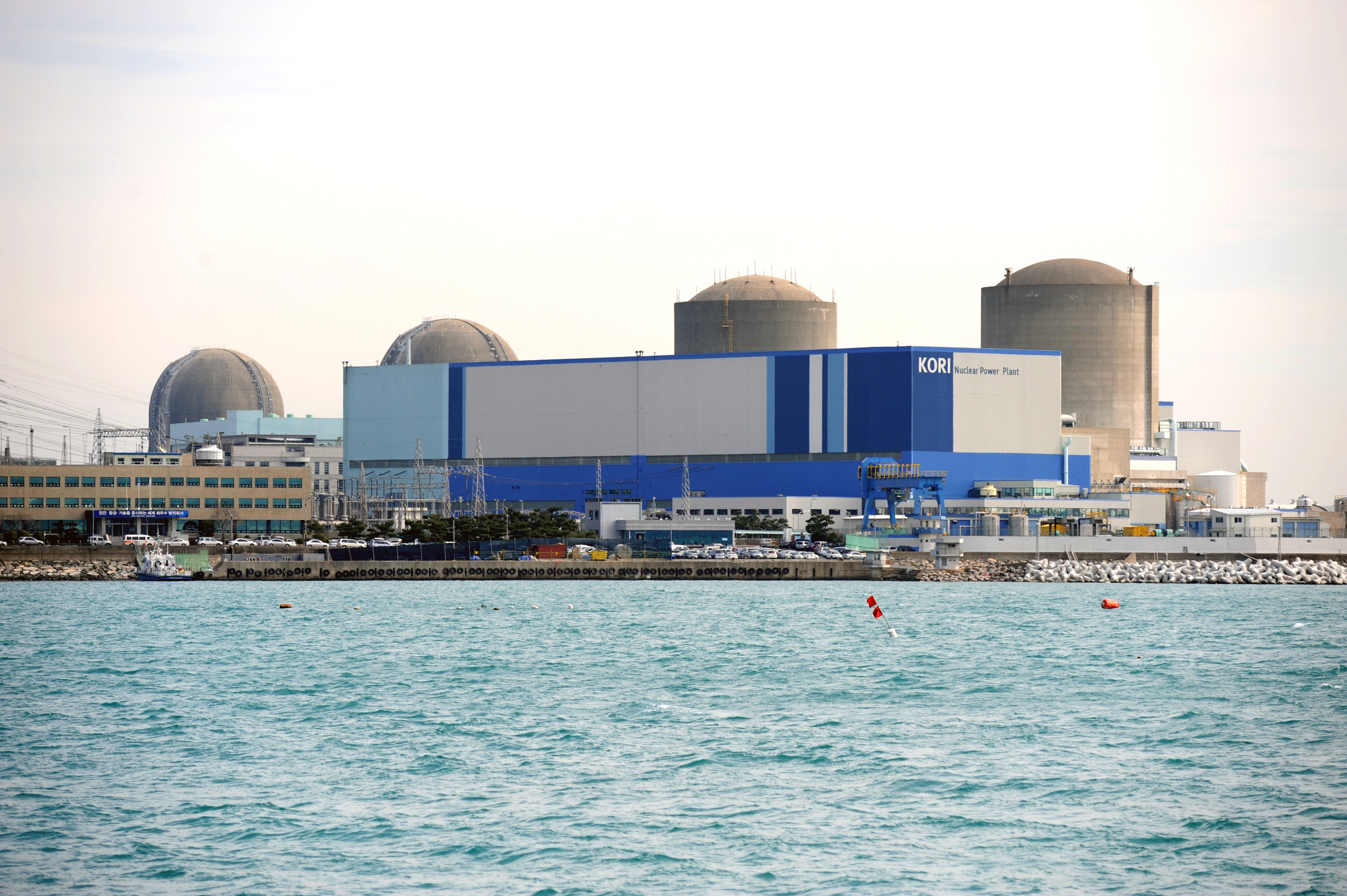
Kori Nuclear Power Plant in Busan

South Korea placed a heavy emphasis on nuclear power generation. The country's first nuclear power plant, the Kori Number One located near Pusan, which opened in 1977. Eight plants operated in 1987, with yearly nuclear power generation at an estimated 39,314 gigawatt-hours, or 53.3% of total electric power output.

According to the International Atomic Energy Agency (IAEA), South Korea has 26 operational nuclear reactors and an installed capacity of approximately 26 GW. In 2025, nuclear energy generated approximately 185 TWh, representing 29% of total electricity production.

For the first time on record, fossil fuels accounted for less than half (49.5%, 21.8 TWh) of South Korea’s total electricity generation.

=== Storage ===
In December 2017, Hyundai Electric announced a plan to build a 150MW grid storage battery near Ulsan for Korea Zinc. A battery system at several substations, with a combined power of 978 MW and energy capacity of 889 MWh, was finished in 2024.

== Global warming ==
Development of carbon dioxide emissions

According to the Carbon Dioxide Information Analysis Center CDIAC South Korea is among the top ten, namely ninth, highest country in carbon dioxide emissions in the period 1950-2005.

== See also ==
- Economy of South Korea
- Environment of South Korea
- Green Party Korea
- One Less Nuclear Power Plant
- Wind power in South Korea
- Solar power in South Korea
- Renewable energy by country
- Energy in North Korea
