= Solar power in South Korea =

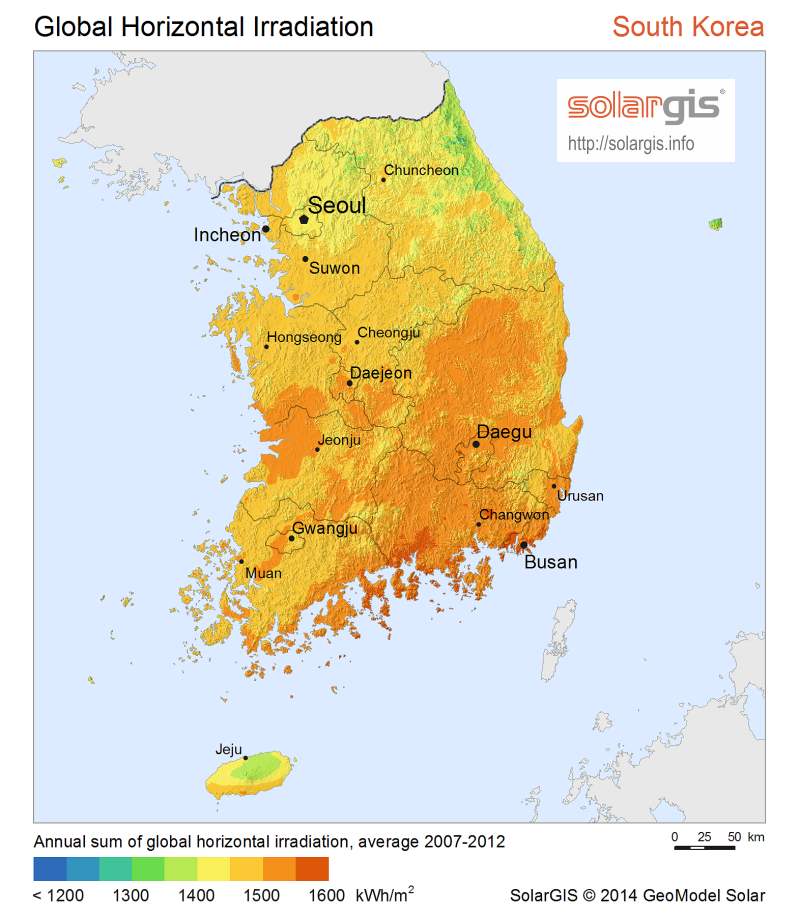
Solar potential

Solar power in South Korea has developed from small-scale research programs of the 1970s into a key component of the nation’s renewable energy strategy. South Korea has expanded solar photovoltaics generation with tools and initiatives such as legal frameworks, feed-in tariffs, national basic energy plans, and municipal programs. Installed photovoltaic capacity grew rapidly in the 2000s and 2010s, but despite years of progress, the nation’s solar sector faces challenges such as pollution, atmospheric conditions, cost factors, technical limitations, and geographic availability.

== History ==
Solar power systems and their development in South Korea began in the 1970s, when the government initiated long-term strategies to diversify energy in response to over dependence on imported fossil fuels and the global oil crises of 1973 and 1979. Early national programs focused on small-scale solar research and developing legal and institutional frameworks to support new renewable energy technologies.

From the 1980s to the 1990s, the South Korea government expanded investment in renewable energy research and development through the Promotion Act on Alternative Energy Development of 1987. This established the country’s first formal legal framework to develop renewable technologies. The act was amended in 1997 to introduce tax benefits and financial incentives with other measures to promote the use and supply of new renewable energy sources

In the 2000s and 2010s, the rate of Photovoltaics (PV) installation increased significantly, driven by national policy tools such as the feed-in tariff scheme for renewable electricity (in place from 2002 to 2011), mandatory new and renewable energy installation requirements for public buildings, and a series of Basic Plans for New and Renewable Energy Technology Development and Dissemination. These plans, including the 1st Basic Plan (in place from 1997–2006), 2nd Basic Plan (in place from 2003–2012), and 3rd Basic Plan (2009–2030), set long-term targets for NRE deployment and provided strategic support for the expansion of South Korea’s solar PV industry.

Installed solar power capacity and generation
Year	2003	2004	2005	2006	2007	2008	2009	2010	2011	2012	2013	2014	2015	2016	2017	2018	2019
Capacity (MW)	5.9	8.5	13.5	35.8	81.1	356.8	523.6	650.3	729.1	1,024	1,555	2,481	3,615	4,502	5,835	8,099	11,767
Generation (GW·h)	7.7	9.8	14.3	31.0	71.2	284.3	566.1	772.8	917.1	1,103	1,605	2,556	3,979	5,122	7,056	9,208	12,996

== Solar resources ==
A 2017 study on feasibility of solar energy in South Korea collected the clearness index - the proportion of extraterrestrial solar radiation that makes it through to the surface - for various stations in South Korea.

Station	Jan.	Feb.	Mar.	Apr.	May	Jun.	Jul.	Aug.	Sep.	Oct.	Nov.	Dec.	Average
Daegwallyeong	0.59	0.52	0.58	0.47	0.53	0.41	0.39	0.41	0.45	0.54	0.45	0.55	0.49
Chuncheon	0.51	0.50	0.55	0.45	0.51	0.48	0.36	0.42	0.46	0.52	0.41	0.47	0.47
Bukgangneung	0.55	0.47	0.53	0.46	0.49	0.39	0.39	0.40	0.44	0.53	0.44	0.55	0.47
Gangneung	0.50	0.44	0.52	0.48	0.52	0.41	0.40	0.42	0.45	0.54	0.43	0.52	0.47
Seoul	0.49	0.45	0.51	0.44	0.47	0.40	0.28	0.35	0.44	0.51	0.40	0.46	0.43
Incheon	0.50	0.46	0.52	0.45	0.49	0.44	0.34	0.40	0.44	0.49	0.41	0.46	0.45
Wonju	0.52	0.48	0.54	0.45	0.52	0.47	0.37	0.42	0.49	0.56	0.42	0.48	0.48
Suwon	0.51	0.48	0.53	0.45	0.50	0.45	0.34	0.39	0.41	0.49	0.40	0.46	0.45
Seosan	0.48	0.45	0.52	0.45	0.50	0.43	0.34	0.38	0.44	0.47	0.37	0.41	0.44
Cheongju	0.48	0.43	0.52	0.45	0.51	0.44	0.36	0.42	0.46	0.52	0.38	0.44	0.45
Daejeon	0.55	0.50	0.59	0.50	0.58	0.48	0.41	0.46	0.52	0.61	0.45	0.49	0.51
Chupungnyeong	0.54	0.47	0.55	0.46	0.53	0.44	0.39	0.40	0.47	0.52	0.42	0.48	0.47
Andong	0.55	0.48	0.56	0.47	0.55	0.46	0.43	0.44	0.47	0.55	0.44	0.50	0.49
Pohang	0.50	0.43	0.53	0.48	0.50	0.40	0.42	0.38	0.43	0.52	0.45	0.50	0.46
Daegu	0.58	0.49	0.58	0.50	0.55	0.36	0.43	0.42	0.47	0.55	0.46	0.51	0.49
Jeonju	0.48	0.43	0.52	0.46	0.51	0.42	0.38	0.41	0.47	0.55	0.40	0.43	0.46
Gwangju	0.50	0.43	0.53	0.48	0.52	0.40	0.38	0.41	0.49	0.57	0.43	0.43	0.47
Busan	0.58	0.45	0.54	0.49	0.51	0.39	0.44	0.43	0.47	0.55	0.49	0.55	0.49
Mokpo	0.46	0.41	0.51	0.47	0.51	0.40	0.38	0.40	0.47	0.52	0.39	0.39	0.44
Heuksando	0.41	0.42	0.56	0.52	0.55	0.45	0.39	0.45	0.52	0.58	0.41	0.37	0.47
Gochang	0.49	0.44	0.54	0.47	0.54	0.45	0.41	0.43	0.49	0.57	0.41	0.45	0.47
Jeju	0.33	0.33	0.49	0.49	0.53	0.39	0.47	0.45	0.49	0.53	0.36	0.29	0.43
Gosan	0.36	0.39	0.53	0.51	0.54	0.39	0.46	0.47	0.51	0.55	0.38	0.32	0.45
Jinju	0.60	0.49	0.57	0.50	0.53	0.41	0.41	0.42	0.48	0.57	0.48	0.56	0.50

== Challenges ==
The challenges of implementing solar power in South Korea include cost, consistency of energy availability, technical and performance limitations, and ecological impact. Regarding the cost of solar projects, this metric is often measured using the levelized cost of energy, which represents the per-unit value of the total cost. In 2015, the projected costs of generating electricity for residential, commercial, and large ground-mounted solar technologies were 170.04 Won/MWh, 134.07 Won/MWh, and 170.04 Won/MWh, respectively. This cost has since decreased as policies have been enacted to support renewable energy implementation, such as tax incentives, feed-in tariffs, and renewable portfolio standards. Each of these initiatives has steadily increased demand for solar PV technology.

The effectiveness of solar power technology has varied due to atmospheric and meteorological conditions. Based on hourly power generation data from 2006 to 2013 from the Korea Power Exchange, meteorological data from the Korea Meteorological Administration (KMA), and air quality data from the Korea Environment Corporation (KECO), a 10 mg/m3 increase in the PM10 air pollutant reduced solar power generation by 2.17 MWh. This contributed to an annual economic loss of USD 2.2 million.

Solar technologies also carry innate drawbacks. Environmental factors, such as lightning strikes and temperature changes, can damage electronics. Maintenance requirements require users to understand how to operate and manage the devices effectively. In addition to independent solar users, training also applies to developing a competent workforce to drive growth in the solar industry. This may require more government programs to train willing participants.

== Government plans ==
=== Municipal ===
In response to the Fukushima nuclear accident, the Seoul Metropolitan Government, in 2017, created the 2022 Solar City Plan. This plan aimed to bolster the residential solar power sector by adding 1 GW of capacity by 2022. Included in this plan is to install mini solar panels at 540,000 apartment balconies, 90,000 rental homes and 370,000 buildings.

=== National ===
In June 2020, President Moon Jae-in announced the Green New Deal, which proposed a $62.18 billion investment into green infrastructure, low-carbon and decentralized energy, and innovation in green industries, such as solar power. On October 28, 2020, Moon Jae-in announced that South Korea aimed to achieve carbon neutrality by 2050. At the time of this announcement, in 2020, solar power's share of electricity generation in South Korea was 3.35%. In 2024, South Korea's solar power share of electricity generation was up to 5.23%

In 2023 President Yoon Suk Yeol's administration released the Tenth Basic Plan during the Basic Plan for Long-term Electricity Supply and Demand Meeting. This plan announced that renewable electricity generation should account for 21.6% of total power generation by 2030 and 30.6% by 2036. This is a slight increase from the target set during the previous Ninth Basic Plan, but a decrease from the 30.2% target that South Korea proposed in its Paris Agreement submission in 2021.
