= Coloane A Power Station =

Power plant in Coloane, Macau, China

Coloane A Power Station 路環發電 - A廠
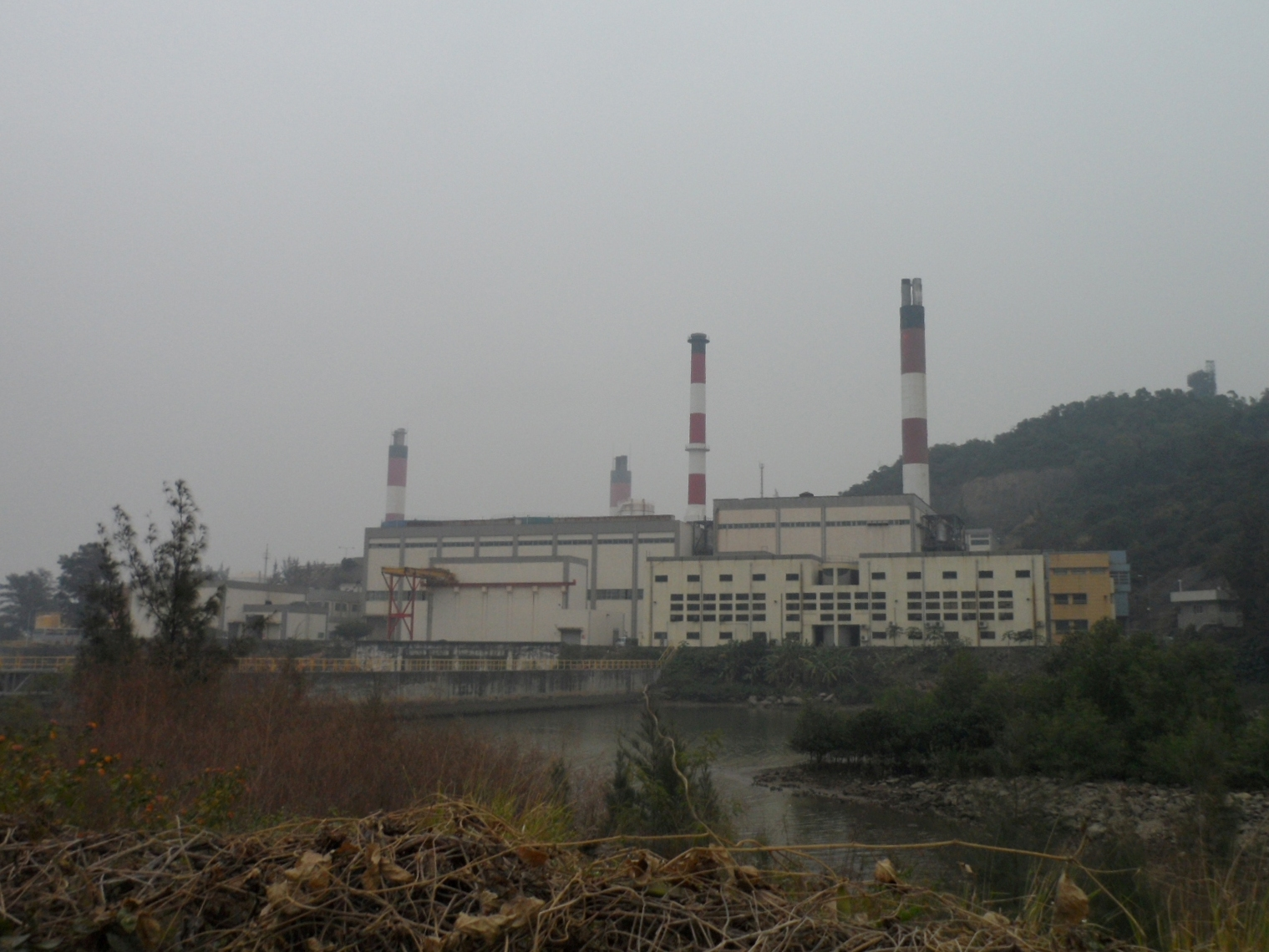
- Country: People's Republic of China
- Location: Coloane, Macau
- Coordinates: 22°8′13″N 113°34′47″E
- Status: Operational
- Commission date: 1978 (G01-G02); 1987 (G03); 1988 (G04); 1991 (G05); 1992 (G06); 1995 (G07); 1996 (G08)
- Owner: Companhia de Electricidade de Macau
- Operator: Companhia de Electricidade de Macau

Power generation
- Units operational: 2 X 20.0 MW (steam); 2 X 24.0 MW (diesel); 2 X 38.6 MW (diesel); 2 X 53.1 MW (diesel)
- Nameplate capacity: 271.4 MW

External links
- Website: Official website
- Commons: Related media on Commons

Coloane A Power Station
- Traditional Chinese: 路環發電 - A廠
- Simplified Chinese: 路环发电 - A厂
Transcriptions
Standard Mandarin
- Hanyu Pinyin: Lùhuán Fādiàn - A chǎng
Yue: Cantonese
- Jyutping: lou6 waan4 faat3 din6 - A cong2

The Coloane A Power Station (CCA; Chinese: 路環發電 - A廠) is a low-speed diesel-fired power station in Coloane, Macau, China. With an installed capacity of 271.4 MW, it is the largest power station in Macau.

== History ==
The power station was commissioned on 28 November 1978.

=== Road access ===
To ease the access leading to the power station, the Government of Macau approved the new construction of access road in 2009. The road was completed a year later and was inaugurated on 16 September 2010. The new gate is expected to make things more convenient for staffs, suppliers and visitors. The road was constructed for the lay down area for the underground high voltage cable and vehicular access at the initial stage after Coloane B Power Station was completed.

=== 2015 blast ===
On 26 April 2015 at 10:30 a.m., there was a blast at the power station on its G08 generation unit, causing injury to one of its personnel who was carrying out periodic maintenance.

== Generation ==
The power station installed capacity makes up 58% of Macau's total installed capacity. In 2012, it generated 98% of total electricity production in Macau.

== See also ==
- CEM (Macau)
- Electricity sector in Macau
- List of power stations in Macau
