= Macau Power Station =

Former power station in Nossa Senhora de Fátima, Macau, China

Macau Power Station 澳門發電廠
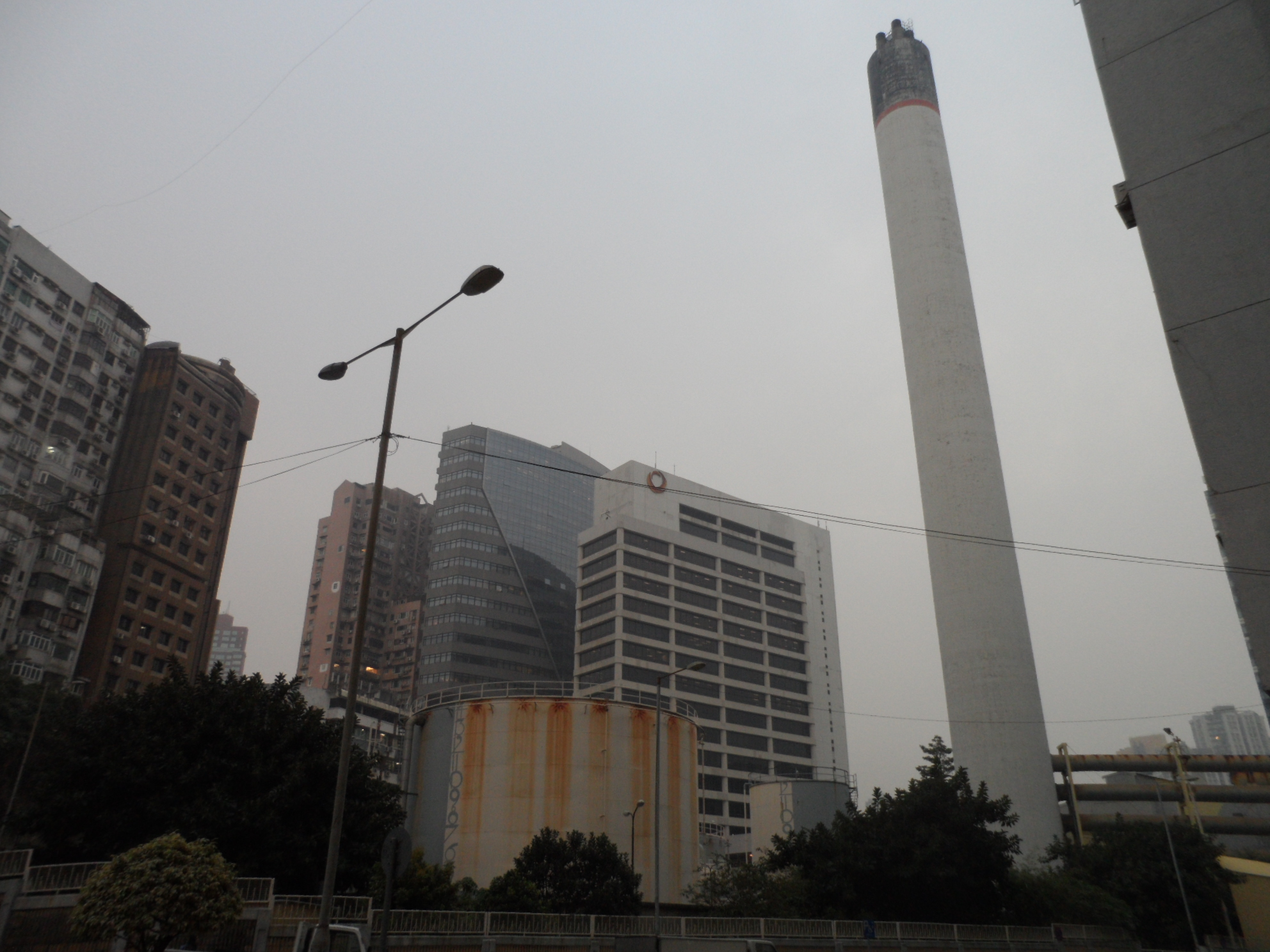
- Country: People's Republic of China
- Location: Nossa Senhora de Fátima, Macau
- Coordinates: 22°12′15″N 113°33′17″E
- Status: Decommissioned
- Commission date: 1973 (T22-T23); 1983 (D25-D28)
- Decommission date: 2016
- Owner: Companhia de Electricidade de Macau
- Operator: Companhia de Electricidade de Macau

Power generation
- Units operational: 2 X 15.1 MW (gas); 4 X 8.5 MW (diesel)
- Nameplate capacity: 64.2 MW

External links
- Website: www.cem-macau.com
- Commons: Related media on Commons

The Macau Power Station (CMC; traditional Chinese: 澳門發電廠; simplified Chinese: 澳门发电厂; pinyin: Àomén Fādiànchǎng, Portuguese: Central Térmica de Macau) was a gas and diesel-fired power station in Nossa Senhora de Fátima, Macau, China. Commissioned in 1973 for its first two units, it was the first power station in Macau. It was decommissioned in 2016.

== History ==
The power plant was originally developed by Macao Electric Lighting Co., Ltd. (MELCO) in the early 1900s. The plant was then operated by the company. There are give unused diesel generators at the plant commissioned between 1964 and 1971.

The existing first two units of gas turbine of CMC was commissioned in 1973 with a total capacity of 30.2 MW. In 1983, four units of diesel fuel turbine were added to the power station, adding another 34 MW to the plant, which made the total installed capacity of CMC became 64.2 MW.

In 1985, Companhia de Electricidade de Macau (CEM) took over the operation of the plant from MELCO.

=== Decommissioning ===
In November 2015, CEM sent a proposal to the Government of Macau indicating a plan to return the land where the power station stands back to the government. In August 2016, CEM said that they were ready to vacate the power station from its land. The environmental impact assessment for the demolition of the plant was completed in the third quarter of 2016. On 21 March 2017, the government had awarded the contract for redevelopment plant of the power plant into public housing in which it will house 1,000 housing units. The license was then issued on 27 April 2017. Around the same time, preparation works for the demolition was completed. The demolition of the facilities and dismantling of the components were finished by the end of 2017. The demolition of all of the major structures were finished by the end of May 2018. Finally, the soil decontamination works were carried out until the end of June 2018 including all of the demolition works.

== Generation ==
The power station installed capacity makes up 13% of Macau's total installed capacity.

== See also ==
- List of power stations in Macau
- Electricity sector in Macau
