= Water supply and sanitation in Macau =

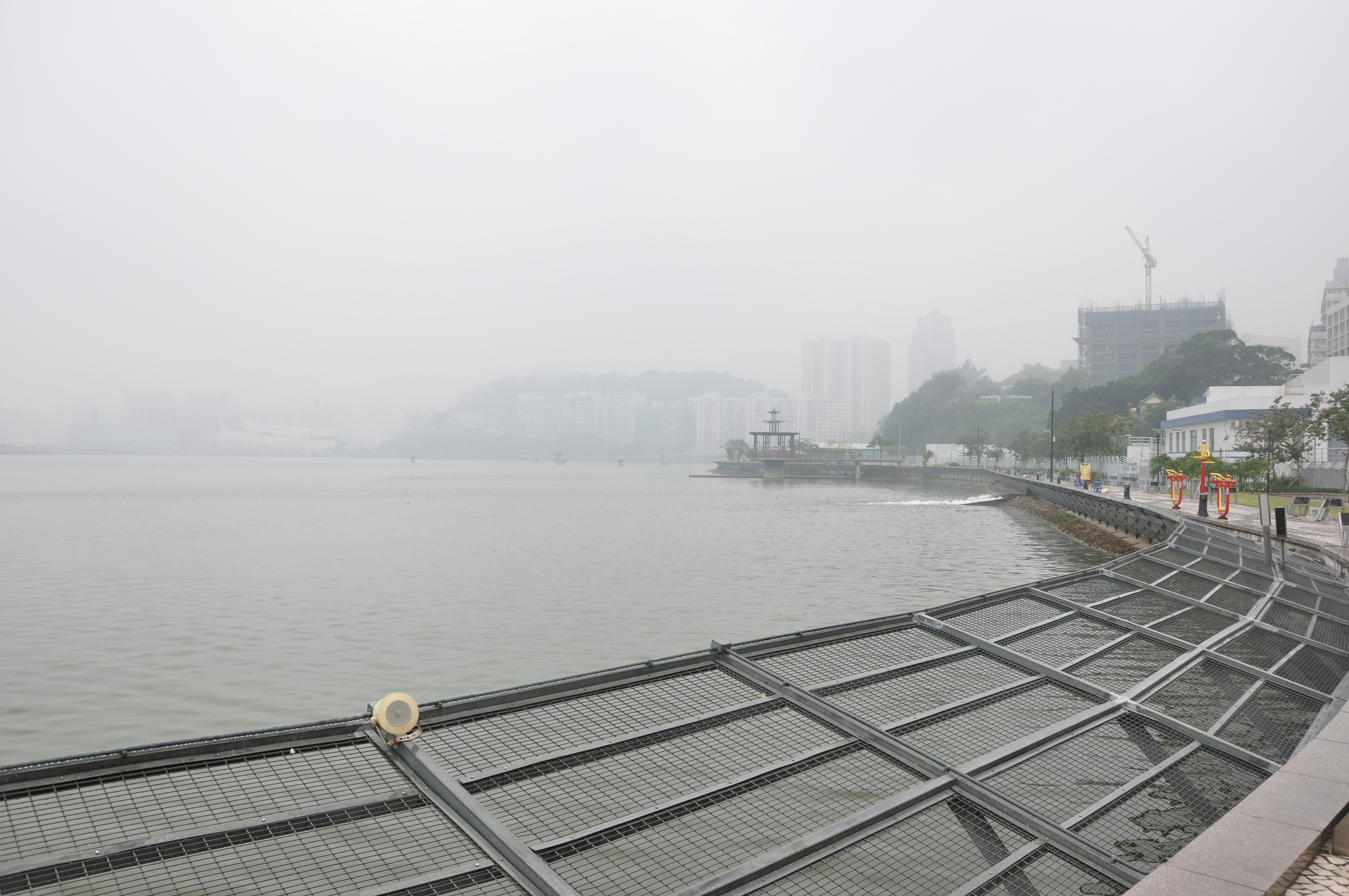
- A reservoir in Macau

Institutions
- National water and sanitation company: Macao Water

Water supply and sanitation in Macau refers to the water supply network in Macau, China.

== Regulator ==
Water supply-related affairs is managed by Macao Water.

== Production ==
As of 2016, the total installed design daily water supply capacity in Macau was 390,000 m^{3} with peak daily demand of 297,600 m^{3}.

== Infrastructure ==
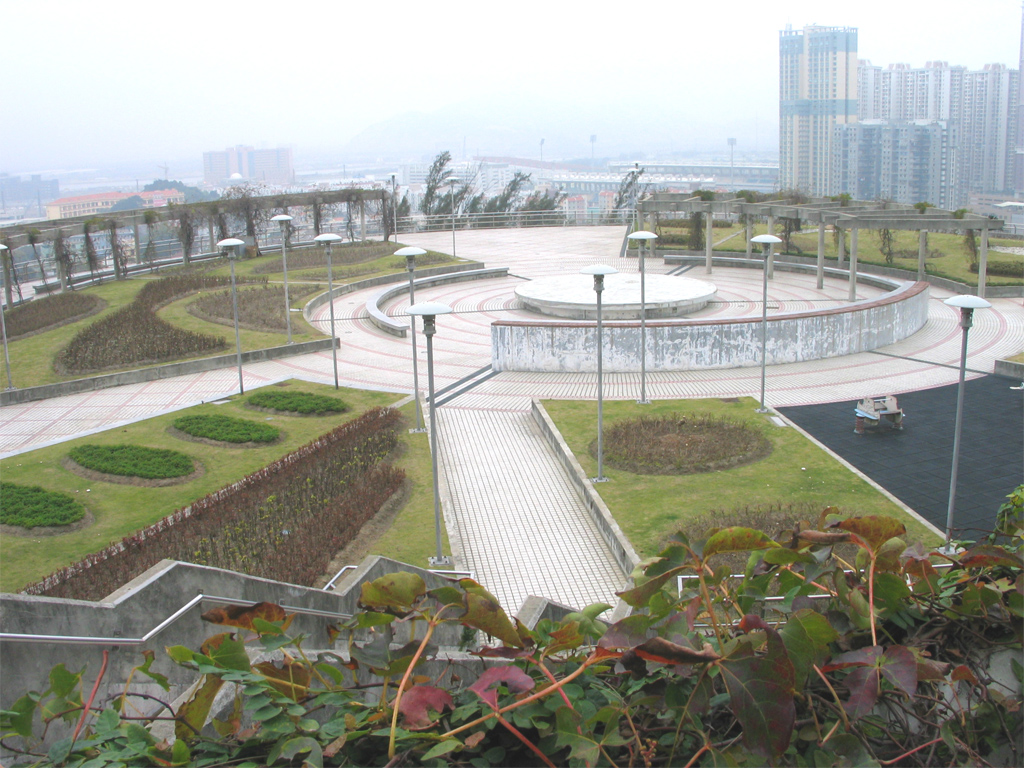
Main Storage Reservoir Water Treatment Plant in Taipa.

Water supply infrastructures in Macau consist of reservoirs, raw water pumping stations, water treatment plants and treated water pumping stations.

=== Reservoirs ===
- Main Storage Reservoir
- Seac Pai Van Reservoir
- Ka Ho Reservoir
- Guia 50m Elevated Treated Water Tank
- Guia 70m Elevated Treated Water Tank
- Taipa 50m Elevated Treated Water Tank
- Taipa 70m Elevated Treated Water Tank

=== Water treatment plants ===
- Ilha Verde Water Treatment Plant
- Main Storage Reservoir Water Treatment Plant
- Coloane Water Treatment Plant

=== Pumping stations ===
==== Raw water pumping stations ====
- Jai Alai Raw Water Pumping Station
- Main Storage Reservoir Raw Water Pumping Station
- Seac Pai Van Raw Water Pumping Station
- Ka Ho Raw Water Pumping Station

==== Treated water pumping stations ====
- Ilha Verde Water Pumping Station
- Main Storage Reservoir Pumping Station
- Guia 50m Pumping Station
- Taipa 50m Pumping Station
- Sai Van Pumping Station
- Seac Pai Van Booster Pumping Station
- Floral Garden Pumping Station
