= Macao Water =

Water utility company in Macau

Macao Water 澳門自來水 SAAM
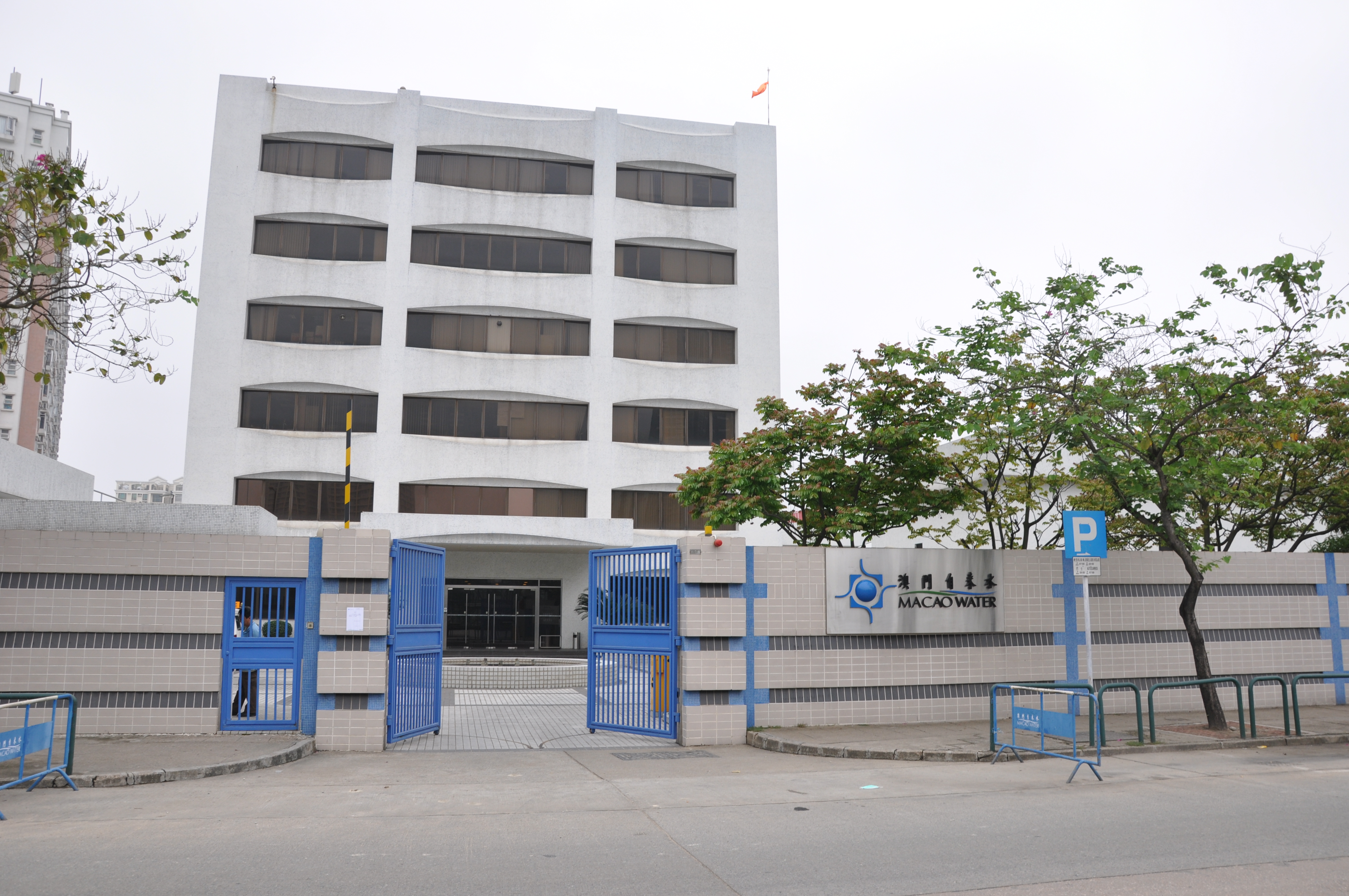
- Industry: Water supply
- Founded: 1932
- Founder: Wong Lei, Wong Kam
- Headquarters: Macau, China
- Area served: Macau
- Key people: Stephen Clark (Chairman); Cheung Chin Cheung (Managing Director); Fan Xiaojun (Executive Director)
- Website: Official website

The Macao Water Supply Company Limited (Chinese: 澳門自來水股份有限公司; Portuguese: Sociedade de Abastecimento de Águas de Macau) or Macao Water (Chinese: 澳門自來水; Portuguese: SAAM) in short, is a company dealing with water supply in Macau, China.

== History ==
Macao Water was originally established in 1932 as a private company in Portuguese Macau. On 1 August 1935, the company became a subsidiary of Macao Electricity Lighting Co. Ltd (MELCO) after the government and MELCO signed a 60-year concession contract. In 1982, it was reorganized to meet the rapidly growing water demands of Macau’s population. In June 1985, Sino-French Holdings (Hong Kong) Limited acquired Macao Water, taking an 85% equity stake.

== Organizational structures ==
- Executive Team
- Finance
- Administration and Human Resources
- Information Services
- Laboratory and Research Center
- Operations
- Automation and Maintenance
- Infrastructure Project
- Customer Services
- Corporate Communications
- Performance Management

== See also ==
- Energy in Macau
