= List of power stations in Macau =

Location of power stations in Macau

The following is a list of all of the active and decommissioned power stations in Macau, China.

== Active power stations ==
Name	Location	Capacity	First commissioned	Owner	Type
Coloane A Power Station (CCA)	Coloane	271.4 MW	1978	CEM	Steam, diesel fuel
Coloane B Power Station (CCB)	Coloane	136.4 MW	2002	CEM	Combined cycle

== Decommissioned power stations ==
Name	Location	Capacity	First commissioned	Decommissioned	Owner	Type
Macau Power Station (CMC)	Our Lady of Fatima Parish	64.2 MW	1973	2016 (demolished)	CEM	Gas, diesel fuel

== See also ==
- Electricity sector in Macau
- CEM (Macau)
- List of power stations
