= Coloane B Power Station =

Power station in Coloane, Macau, China

Coloane B Power Station 路環發電 - B廠
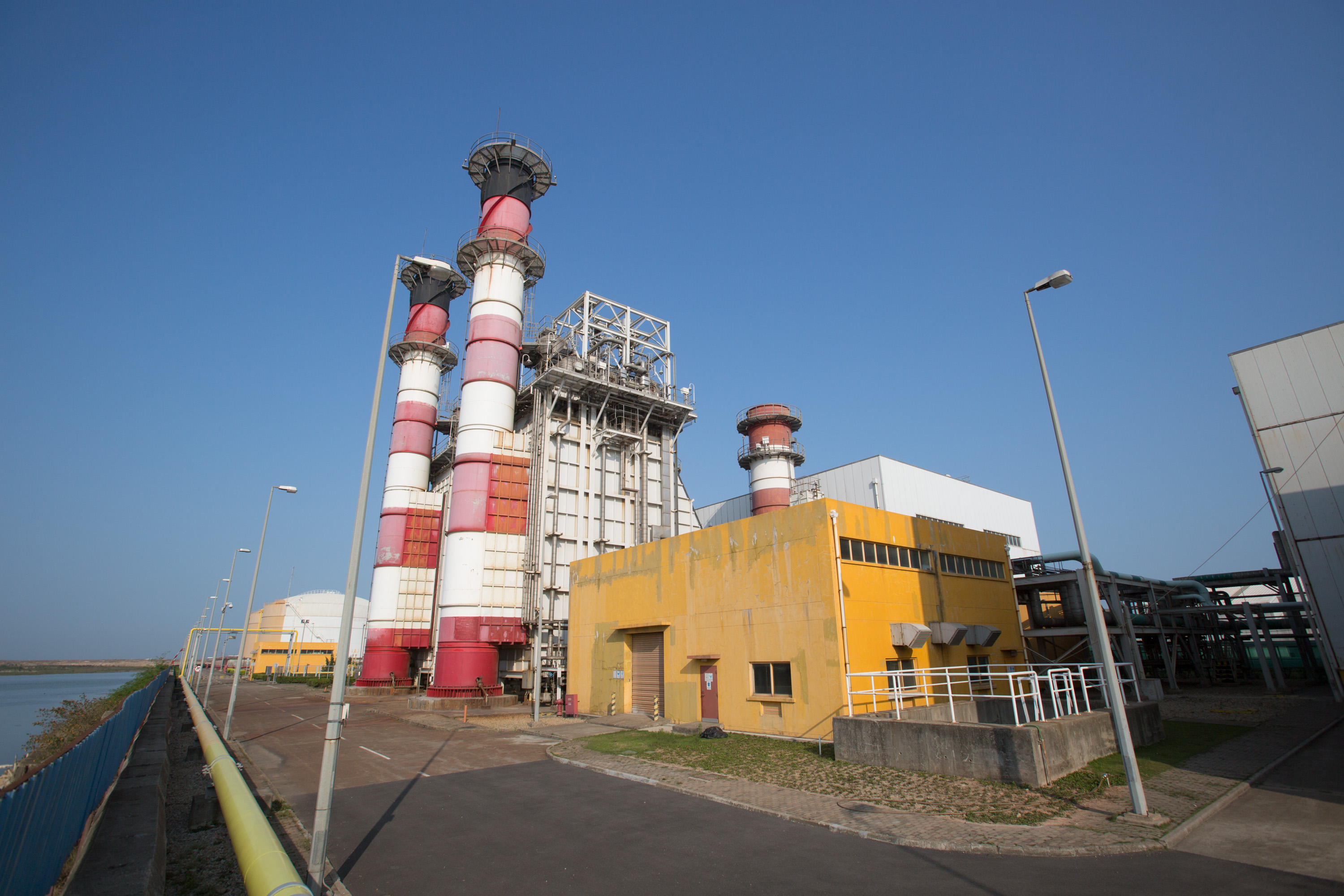
- Country: People's Republic of China
- Location: Coloane, Macau
- Coordinates: 22°8′28″N 113°34′51″E
- Status: Operational
- Commission date: 2002 (GT1); 2003 (GT2, ST1)
- Construction cost: MOP 1.2 billion
- Owner: Companhia de Electricidade de Macau
- Operator: Companhia de Electricidade de Macau

Power generation
- Units operational: 2 X 45.1 MW (gas); 1 X 46.2 MW (steam)
- Nameplate capacity: 136.4 MW

External links
- Website: Official website
- Commons: Related media on Commons

Coloane B Power Station
- Traditional Chinese: 路環發電 - B廠
- Simplified Chinese: 路环发电 - B厂
Transcriptions
Standard Mandarin
- Hanyu Pinyin: Lùhuán Fādiàn - B chǎng
Yue: Cantonese
- Jyutping: lou6 waan4 faat3 din6 - B cong2

The Coloane B Power Station (CCB; Chinese: 路環發電 - B廠) is a combined cycle gas-fired power station in Coloane, Macau, China. It is the latest power station in Macau.

== History ==
The power station was formally inaugurated on 8 April 2003 in a ceremony attended by Edmund Ho, the Chief Executive of Macau. Upon its launch, the power plant added 38% growth to Macau's total installed capacity of electricity generation.

== Generation ==
The power station installed capacity makes up 29% of Macau's total installed capacity. In 2012, it generated 2% of total electricity production in Macau.

== See also ==
- CEM (Macau)
- Electricity sector in Macau
- List of power stations in Macau
