= Energy in Macau =

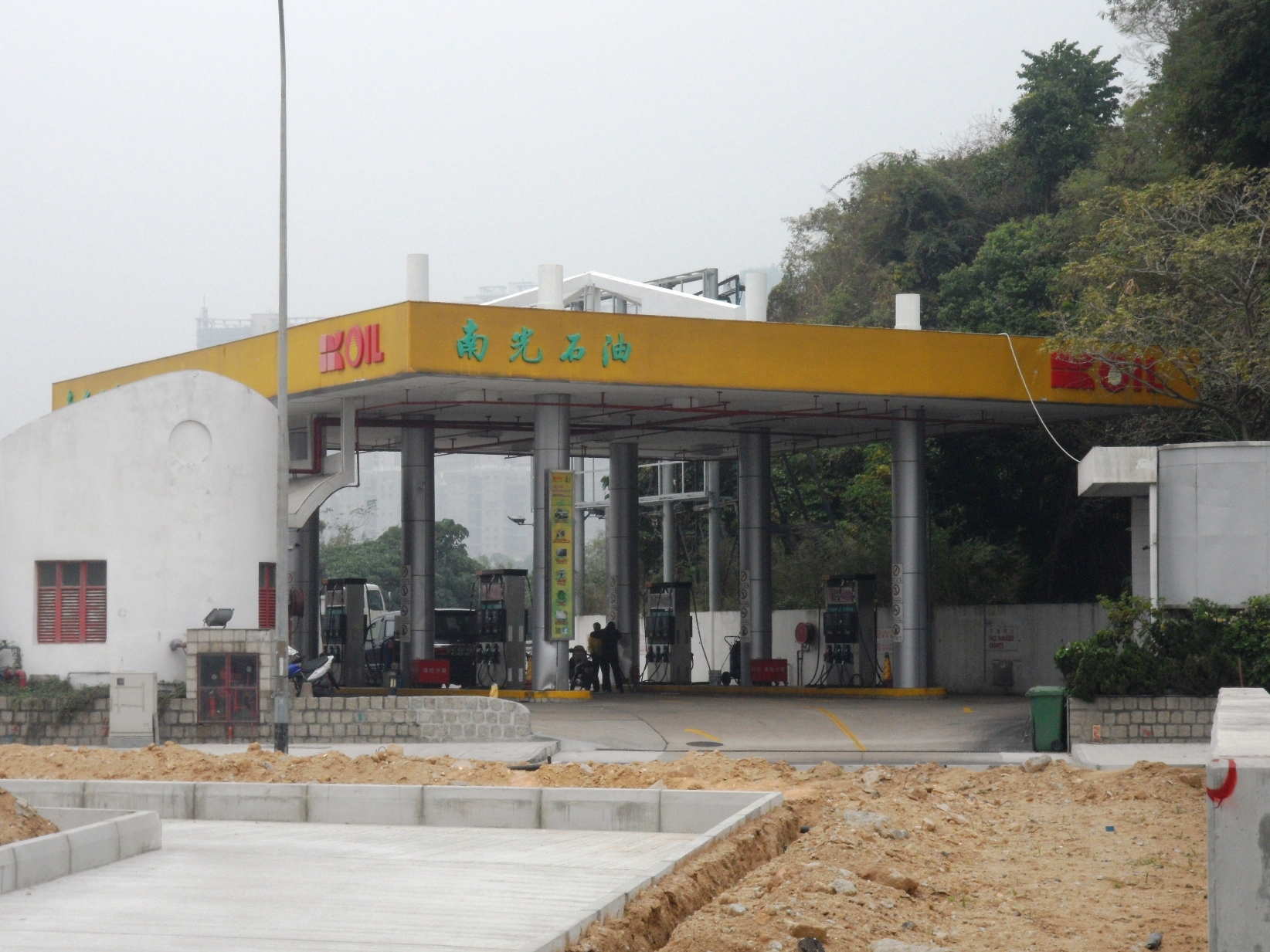
NKOIL filling station in Macau

The energy in Macau is mostly supplied by the rest of China. Energy-related affairs are administered under the Secretariat for Transport and Public Works of the Government of Macau.

== Electricity ==
The Companhia de Electricidade de Macau (CEM) is the sole provider of electricity to Macau. In 2023, 5,935.9 gigawatt-hours (GWh) were consumed in Macau, a record high due to a heatwave and 9.1% higher than 2022, with 89.7% (5,327.3 GWh) coming from mainland China and the remainder generated locally.

Efforts are being made to utilise more clean energy. In 2026, CEM commissioned its first solar project capable of generating at least a megawatt of electricity, increasing solar energy production by 130%. The government announced its negotiations with the China Southern Power Grid, aiming to achieve 50% of imported electricity being generated by clean energy. In addition, Macau's local power plant now runs entirely on natural gas.

== Natural gas ==
Macau imports natural gas from Hengqin, an island in Zhuhai, Guangdong, via a 12.9-kilometre (8.0 mi) pipeline. The sole gas importer in Macau was Sinosky Energy (Holdings) Co. Ltd. (Chinese: 中天能源控股有限公司), but it was replaced by Macau City Gas Company Ltd. on 1 January 2022.

== Petroleum ==
Petroleum and other petrochemical products in Macau is handled by Nam Kwong Petroleum & Chemical Co., Ltd. (NKOIL; Chinese: 南光石油化工有限公司) from its trading, storage, transportation, wholesale and retail, including the installation and maintenance of gas and fuel supply system.

== See also ==
- Energy policy of China
- Electricity sector in Macau
