= Electricity sector in Macau =

Electricity sector of Macau
Data
- Average electricity use (2016): 5,255 GWh

Institutions
- Responsibility for transmission: Companhia de Electricidade de Macau
- Responsibility for regulation: Companhia de Electricidade de Macau

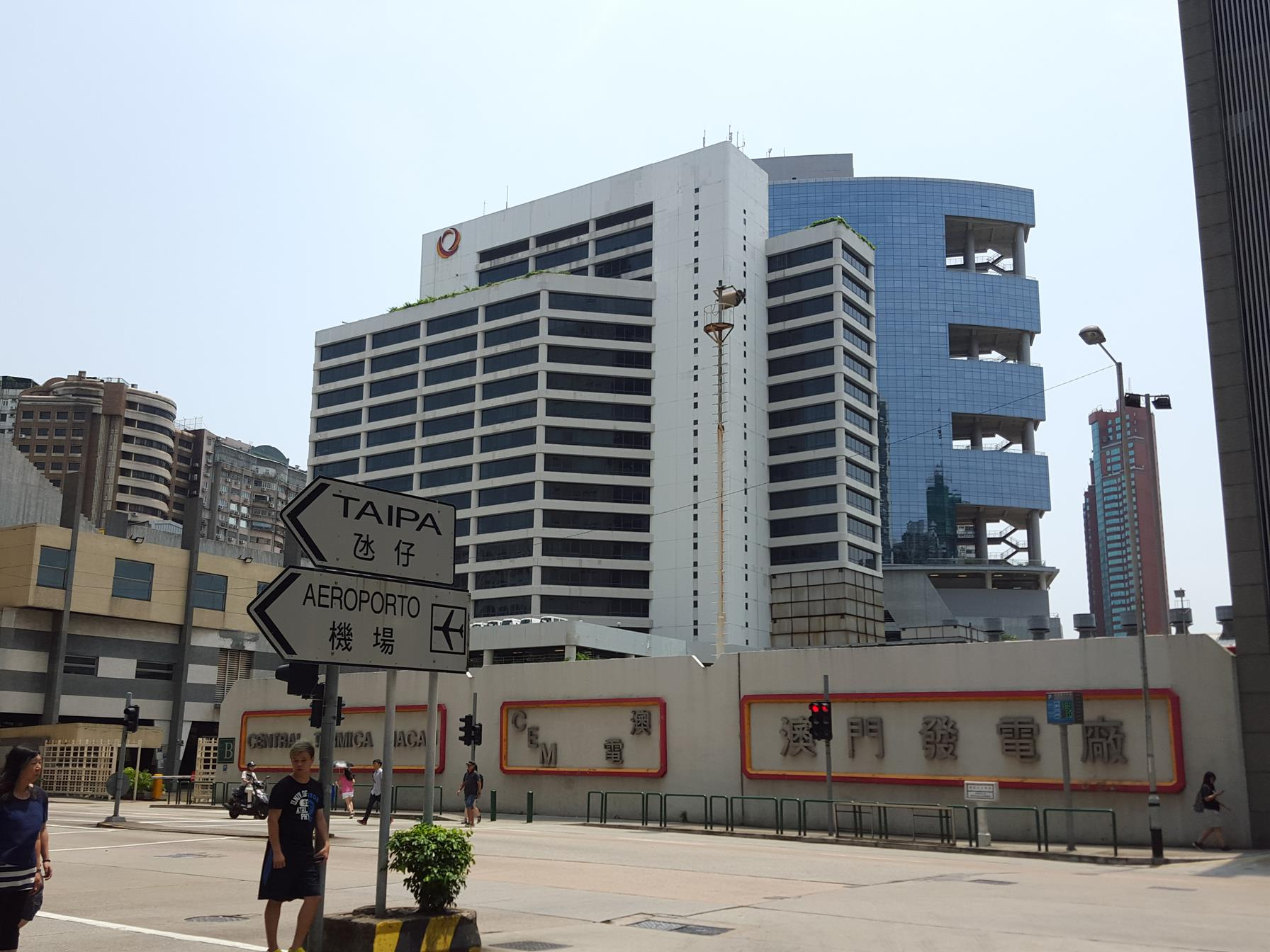
CEM Office

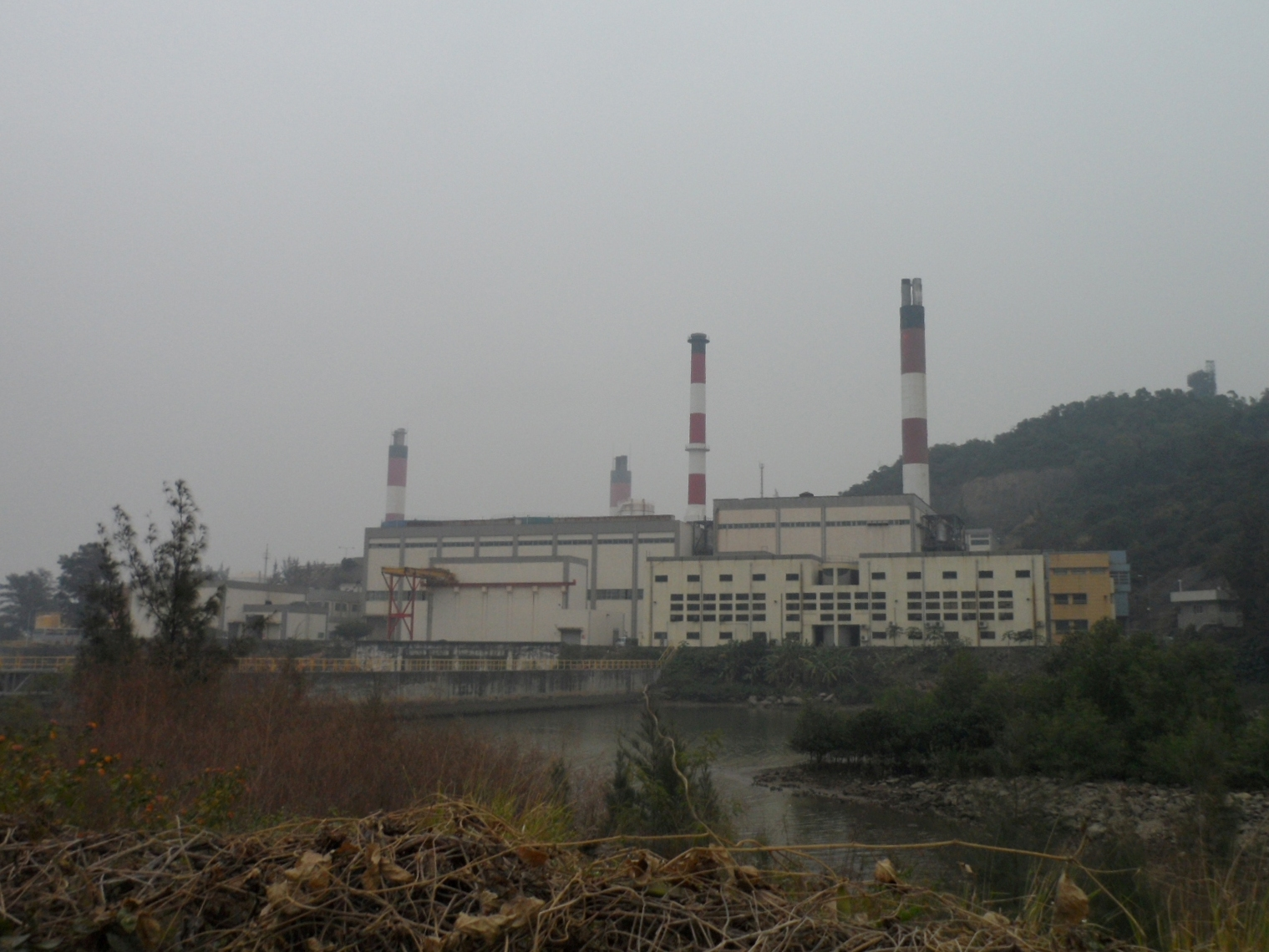
Coloane A Power Station, Macau's largest power station

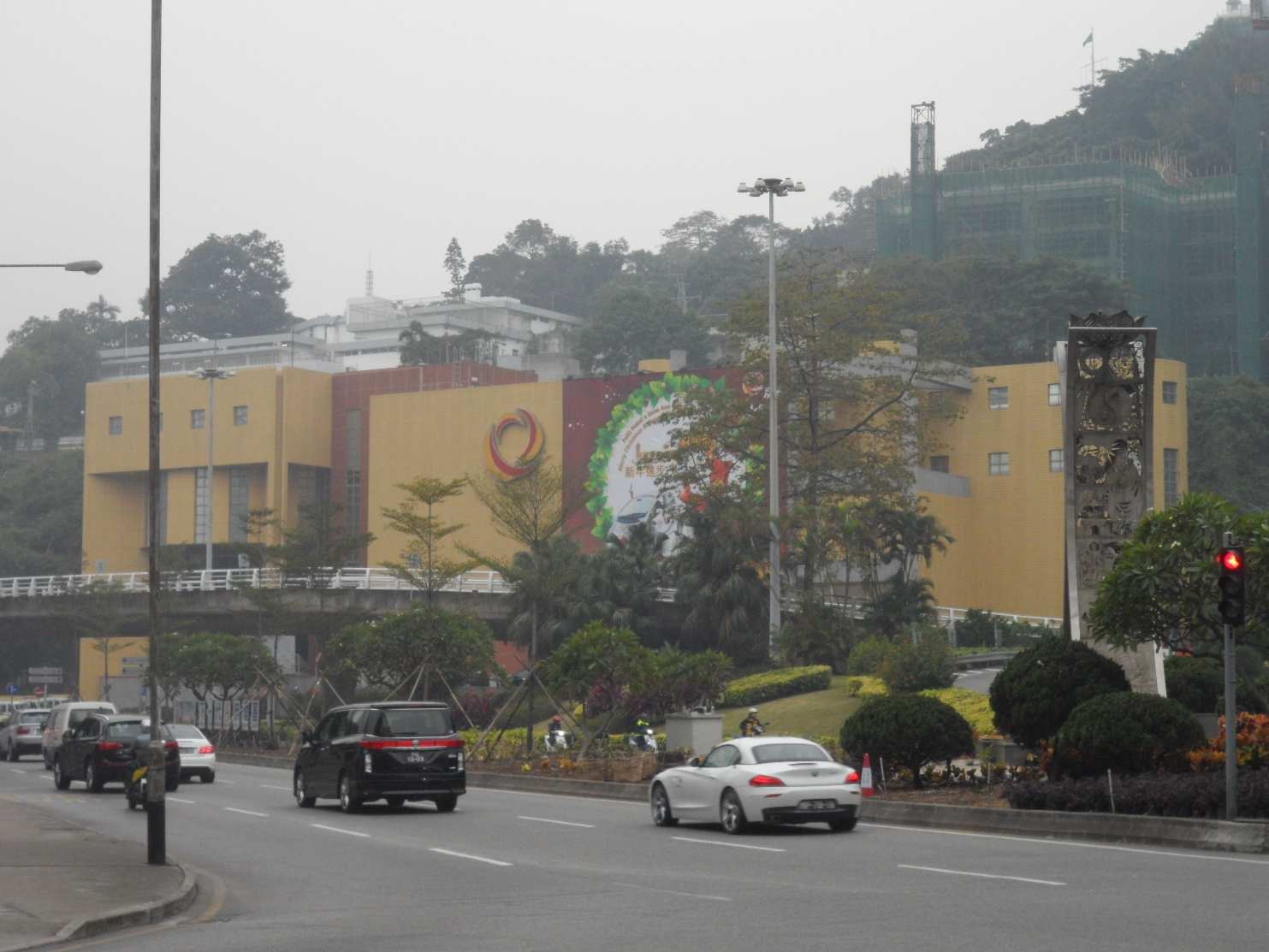
System Dispatch Center

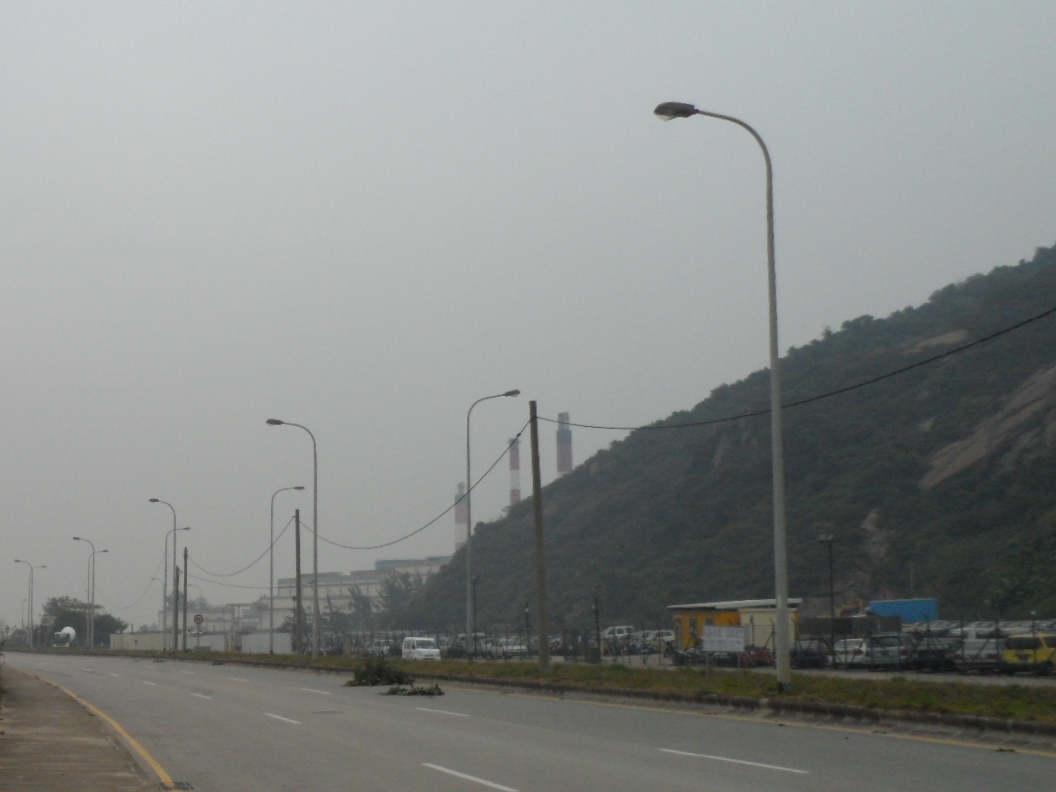
Overhead distribution line in Cotai

The electricity sector in Macau ranges from generation, transmission, distribution and sales of electricity in Macau, China.

== Regulator ==
Electricity sector in Macau is regulated by its electric power utility company Companhia de Electricidade de Macau (CEM), established in 1972 during the Portuguese rule.

== Generation ==
=== Electricity generation in Macau ===
CEM's generation facility consists of two power stations, which are located on Coloane Island: Coloane A Power Station (CCA) and Coloane B Power Station (CCB). Together, CEM has a total installed capacity of 407.8 MW.

The predominant types of generation technology deployed are the low speed diesel generator using heavy fuel oil for CCA and the combined cycle gas turbine using natural gas for CCB.

=== Electricity import from Mainland China ===
In 2012, CEM produced 376 GWh to supply 8% of Macau's 4,344 GWh gross energy demand, while the remaining 3,968 MW (92%) was imported from Mainland China through Guangdong Power Grid under China Southern Power Grid Company. In 2013, CEM generated 7.2% electricity for Macau, while the electricity import from Mainland China rose to 92.8%.

== Transmission and distribution ==
The Macau electrical transmission network comprises 20 primary substations with a total installed capacity of 1,260 MVA in 220/110 kV, 1,500 MVA in 110/66 kV and 1,752 MVA in 66/11 kV.

As of December 2012, the high voltage transmission network consists of 281 km line made up of 220 kV, 110 kV and 66 kV cables. The 11 kV medium voltage distribution network is composed of 35 switching stations and 1,245 customer substations (11/0.4 kV) connected by cables with a total length of 617 km. The low voltage distribution network is made up of 780 km of cables. Almost all CEM's power network is constituted by underground cables which mainly come from Europe, United States and South Korea.

Electrical grid in Macau has been linked to electrical grid of Guangdong since 1984.

In 2015, CEM announced that over the next three years, CEM will build another five new substations to power up the upcoming Macau Light Rail Transit, hospitals and Ilha Verde.

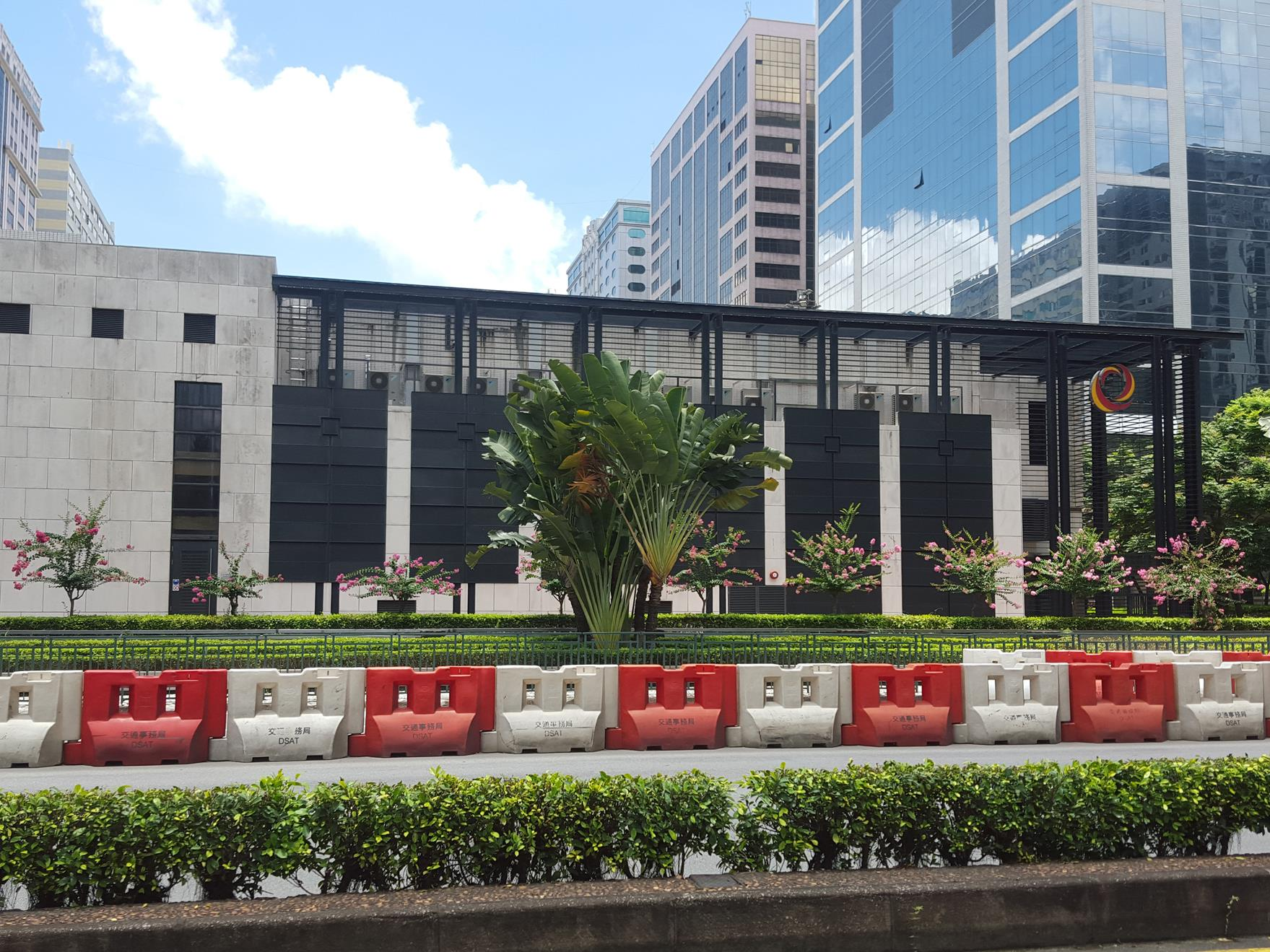
NAPE Substation

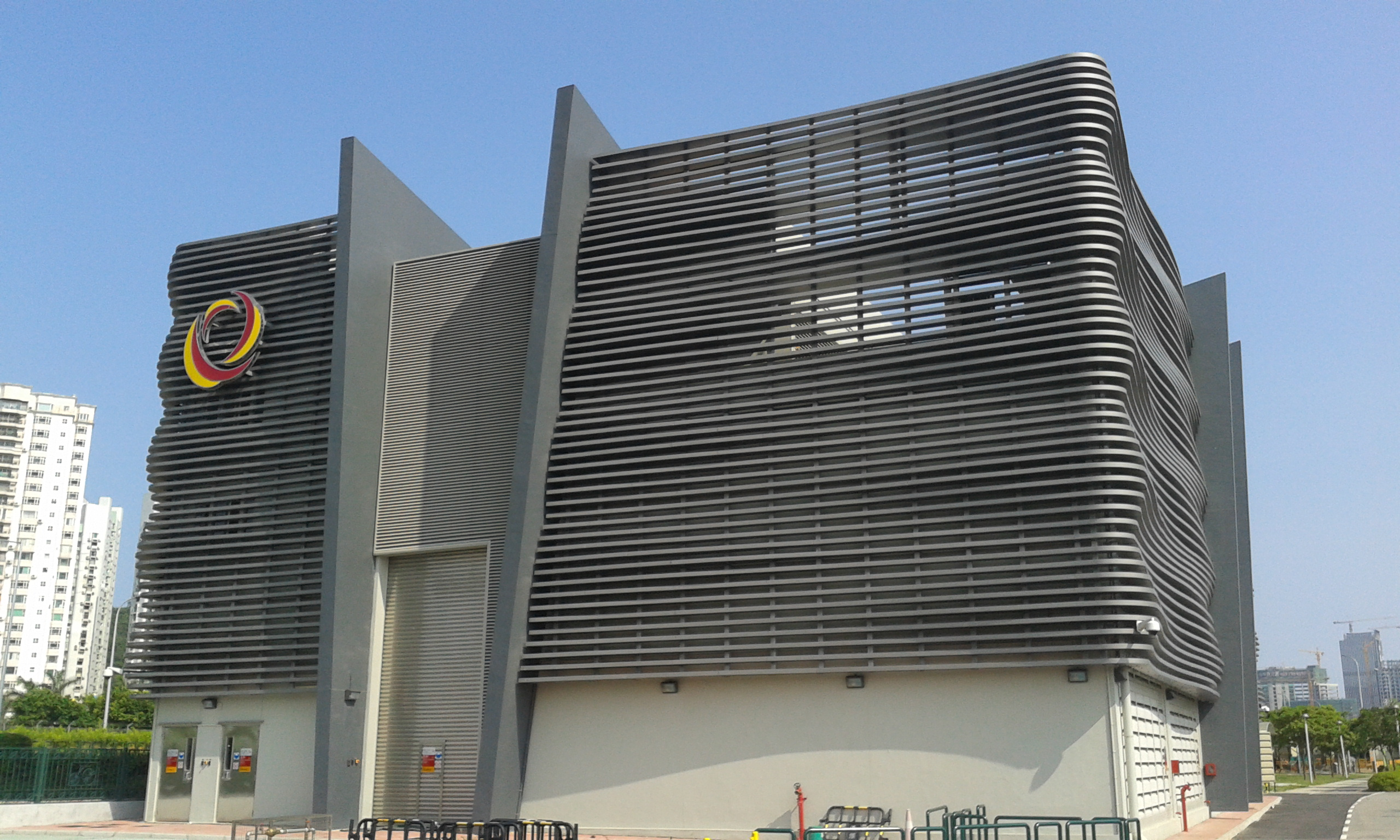
Ocean Garden Substation

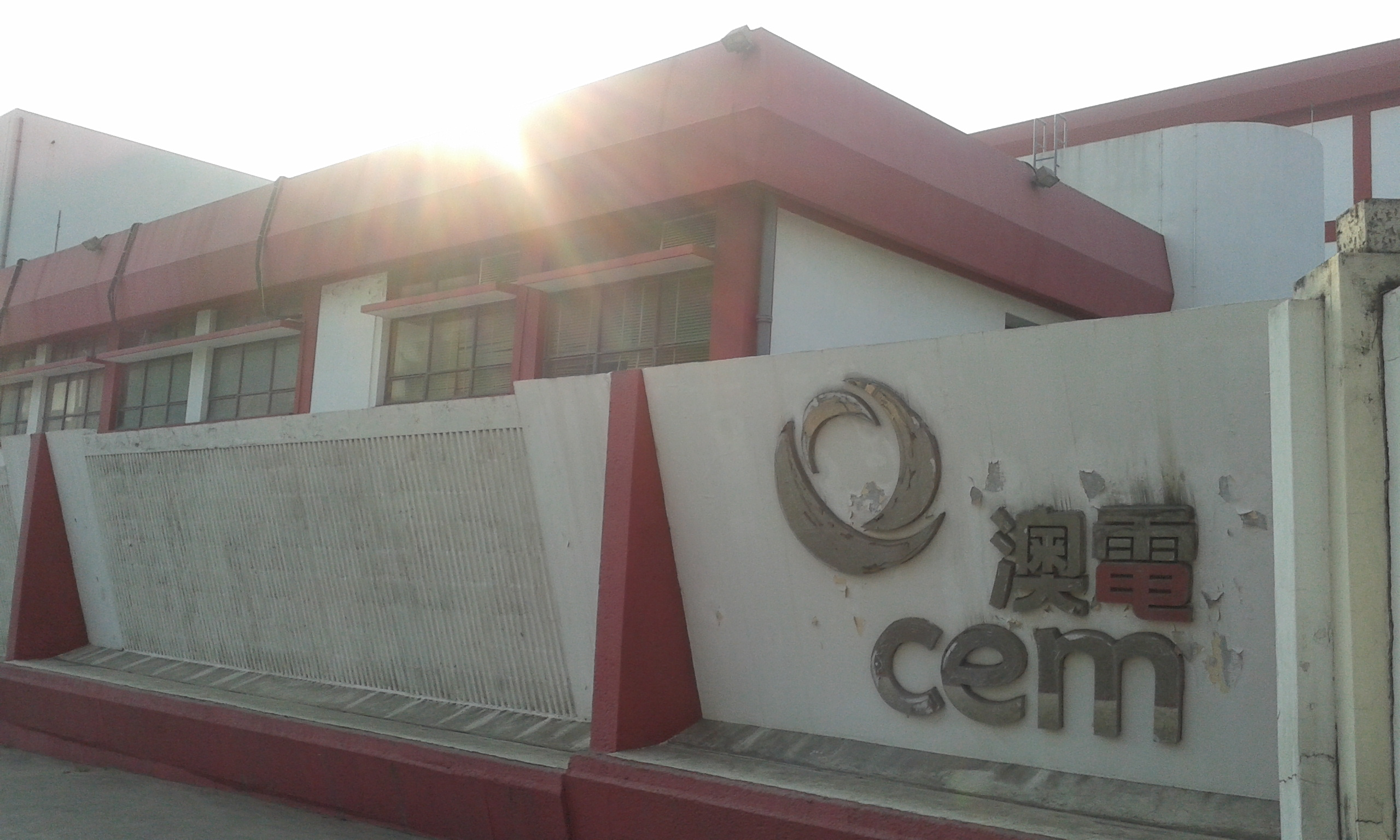
North of Macau Substation

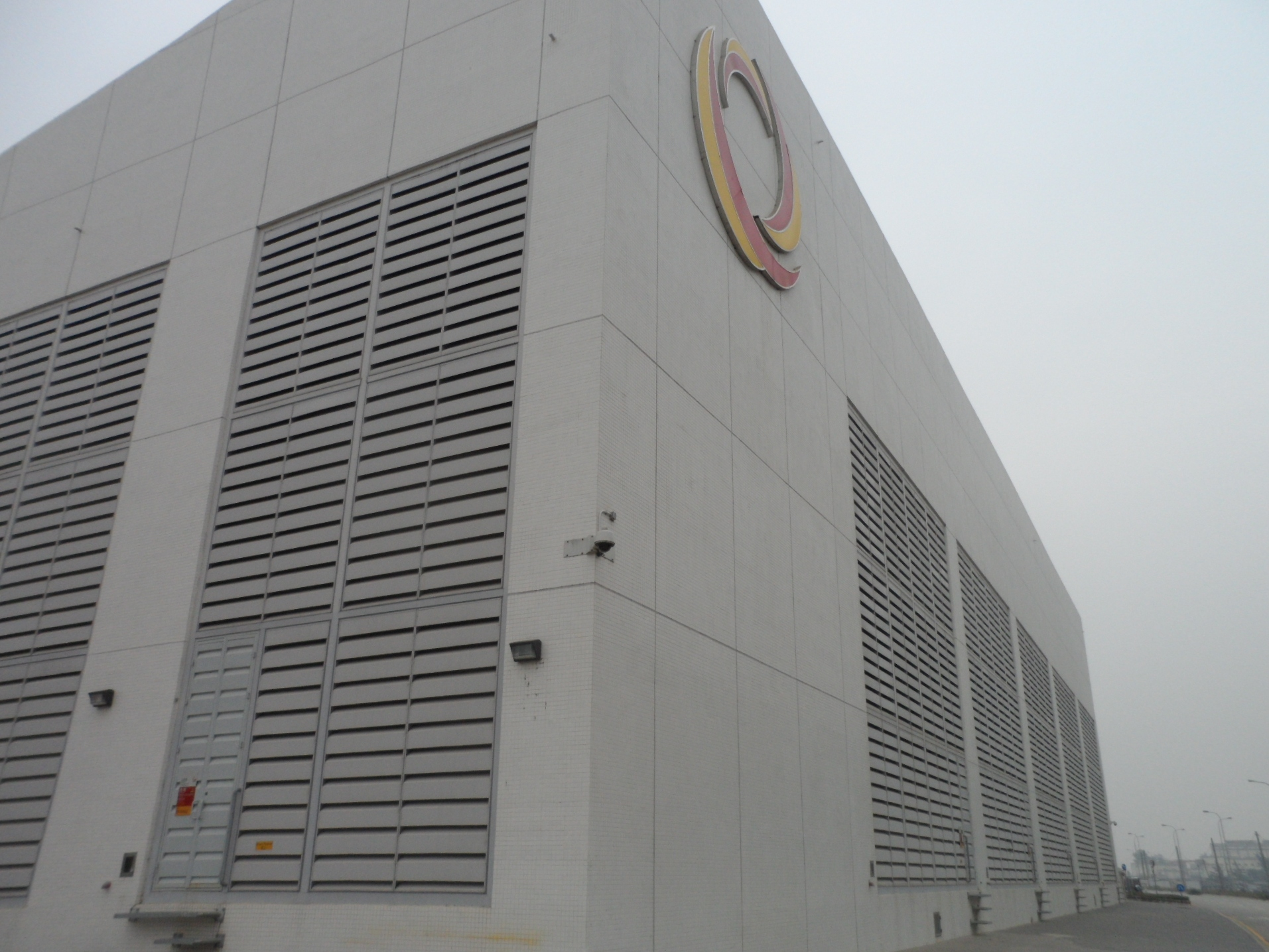
Lotus Substation

== Interconnection grid with Mainland China ==
Macau has also interconnection grids with Mainland China in Guangdong with Guangdong Power Grid of the China Southern Power Grid Company.

The first interconnection commissioned in June 2008 are the three 220 kV circuits connected at the 220/110 kV Canal dos Patos substation, with the importation capacity of 1,050 MVA. The second interconnection commissioned in June 2012 are the two 220 kV circuits connected at the 220/110 kV Lotus substation, with the importation capacity of 700 MVA. These five interconnection circuits give a total of 1,750 MVA importation electric capacity for Macau from Guangdong in Mainland China.

== Load, demand and customers ==
As of 2017, Macau has been experiencing an average 2.3% annual growth rate for their electricity demand. Their maximum daily electricity demand is 756.7 MW. As of 2016, total Macau power consumption reached 5,255 GWh. Macau's utility frequency is 50 Hz and at 400 V (three-phase) and 230 V (single-phase).

By the end of 2007, CEM was providing electricity to 211,238 customers, in which 75% of them are in the Macau Peninsula, while the remaining 21.9% are in Taipa and 3.1% in Coloane. Electricity reaches every individual in Macau.

In 2016, there were 71 charging stations for electric vehicles across 18 public car parks in Macau.

== Performances ==
CEM's power supply reliability maintains at world leading performance. The Average System Availability Index (ASAI) reached 99.9998% in 2010. In 2014, the System Average Interruption Duration Index was as low as 1.34 minutes. CEM has five mobile equipment units as contingency measures to deal with electricity blackouts. All of the underground installed cables undergo regular routine inspection and diagnosis every five years.

CEM has established and implemented an Integrated Management System with all three Management System Certifications ISO 9001, ISO 14001 and OHSAS 18001]. CEM was the first public utility company in Macau and the first power company in Hong Kong and Macau to obtain the certification ISO 14064-1 Greenhouse Gases Management System by taking systematic and genuine actions against greenhouse gases emissions.

== Environmental protection ==
In order to cope with the growing concern on environmental issues, CEM has invested more than MOP 450 million to improve CEM environmental performance, including investment in Selective Catalytic Reduction Systems, Natural Gas Conversion, Air Quality Monitoring Systems, Scrap Yard, Noise Control Facilities etc.

== Power sector safety ==
Every year, CEM holds fire alarm and evacuation drills at different locations of its premises to test and evaluate the effectiveness of their contingency plans, further enhance the emergency response abilities of all the participating staffs and ensure the safety of the employees and facilities.

== See also ==
- CEM (Macau)
- List of power stations in Macau
- Energy in Macau
- List of electricity sectors
- Electricity sector in China
