= Companhia de Electricidade de Macau =

Privately-owned public electric utility in Macau

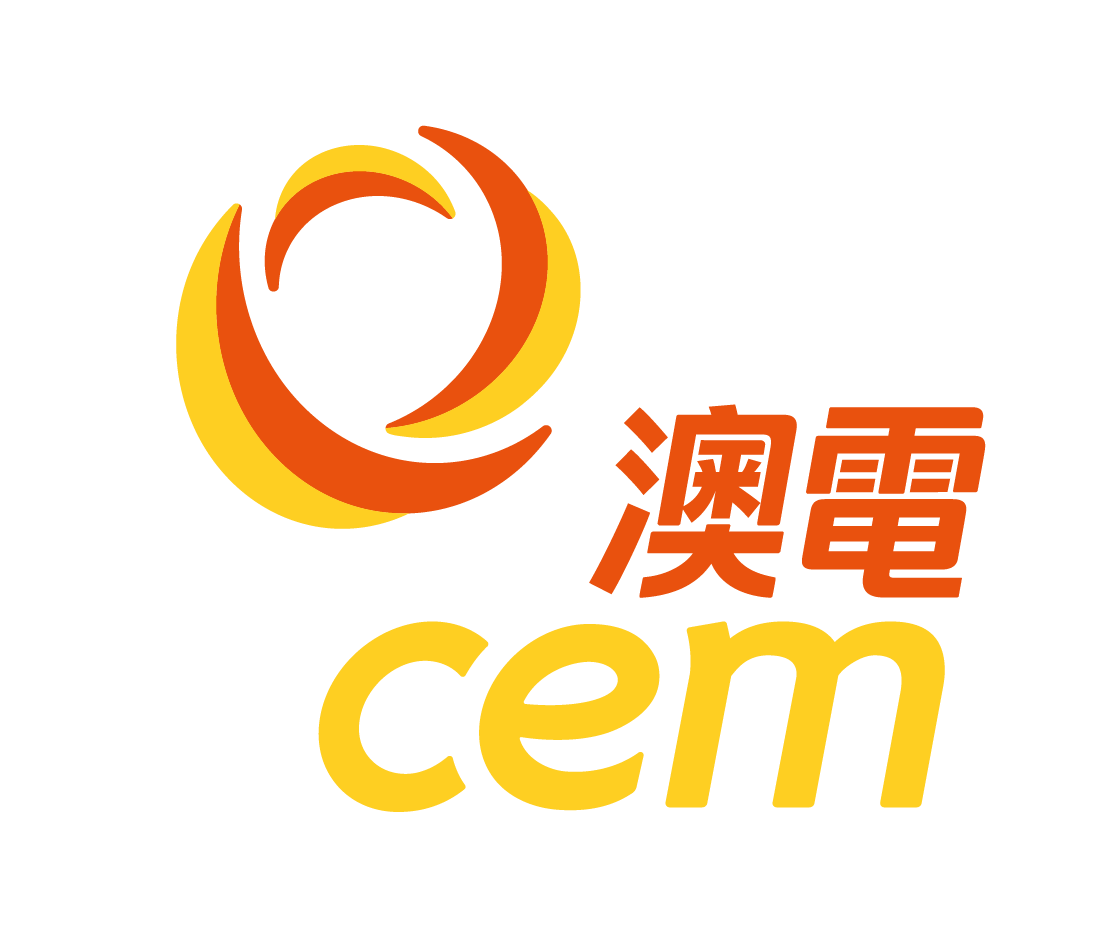
- Industry: Electrical power
- Founded: 1972
- Headquarters: Macau
- Key people: Fu Jianguo (Chairman of Board of Directors); João Marques da Cruz (Vice-Chairman of Board of Directors); Bernie Leong (Chairman of Executive Committee)
- Products: Electricity
- Services: Electricity distribution and transmission

Chinese name
- Traditional Chinese: 澳門電力股份有限公司
- Simplified Chinese: 澳门电力股份有限公司
Transcriptions

Alternative Chinese name
- Traditional Chinese: 澳門電力
- Simplified Chinese: 澳门电力
Transcriptions

Second alternative Chinese name
- Traditional Chinese: 澳電
- Simplified Chinese: 澳电
Transcriptions
- Website: www.cem-macau.com

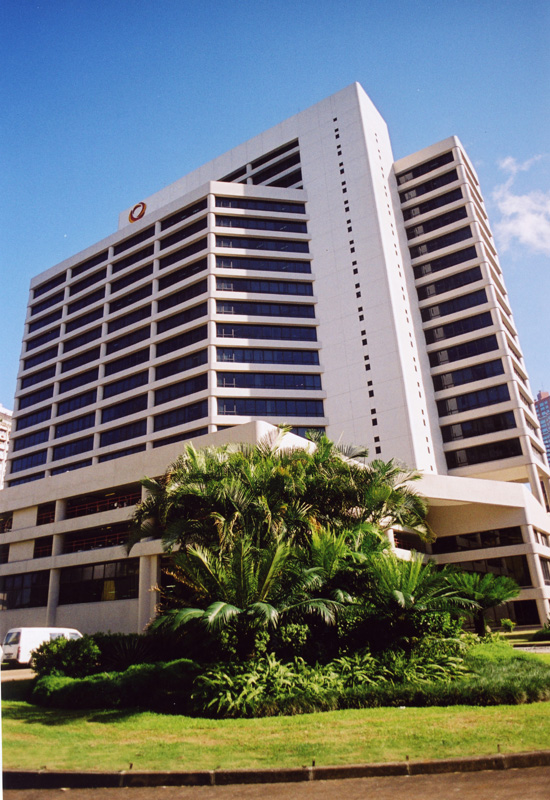
CEM Headquarter

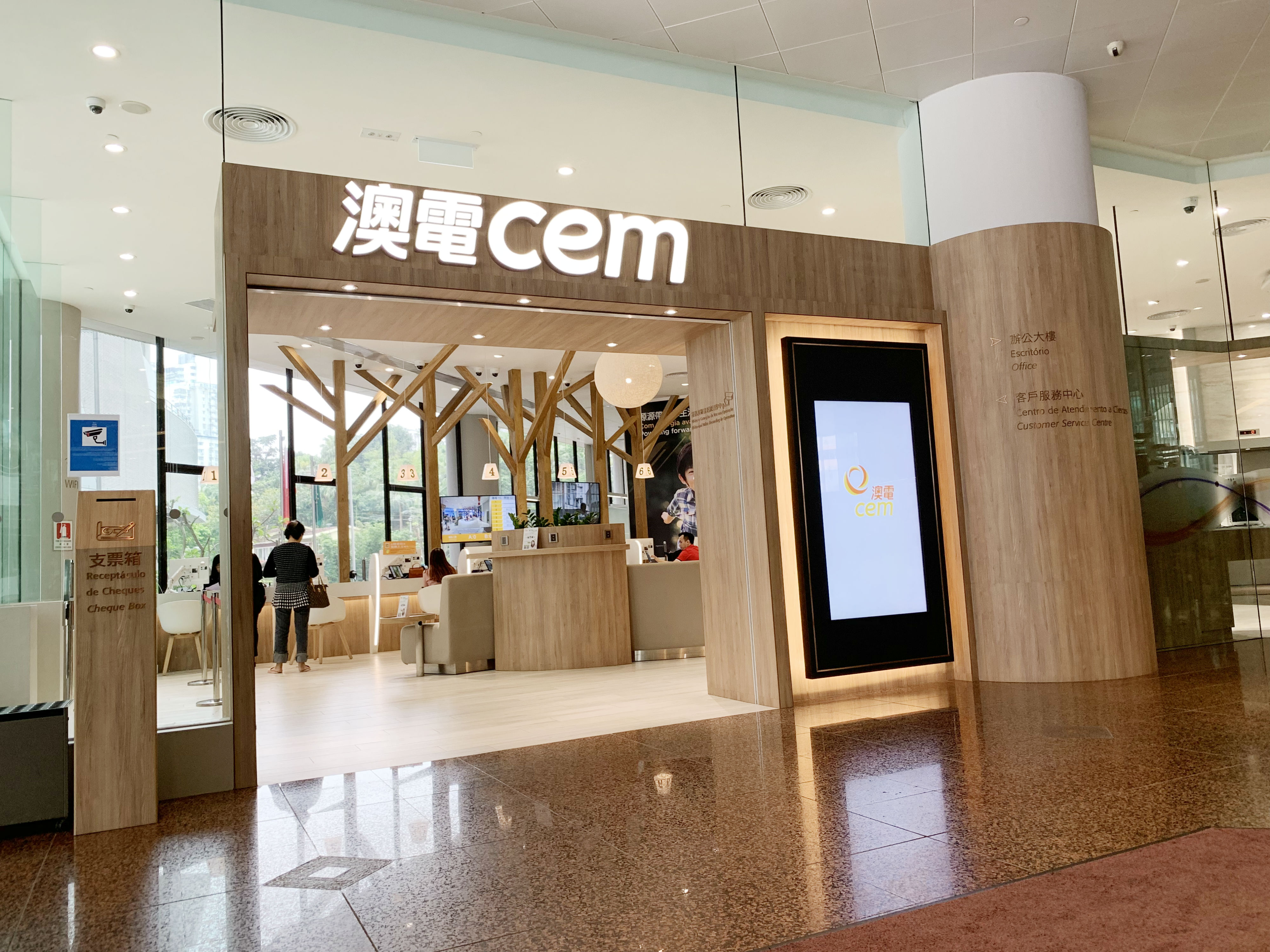
Customer Service Centre at CEM Building

Companhia de Electricidade de Macau – CEM, S.A. known simply as CEM or Chinese: 澳電 is a private public utility company with a sole concession to transmit, distribute, sell high, medium and low voltage of electricity in Macau. Besides, CEM owns an installed generation capacity of 408 MW.

== History ==
From 1906 to 1972, the electricity supply service was managed by the "Macao Electric Lighting Company Ltd." (now Melco International Development), which had its headquarters in British Hong Kong. In 1972, due to non-fulfilment of its concession contract with the former Portuguese administration, the company was replaced by CEM.

CEM was restructured with the former Portuguese administration's support in 1982. In 1985, CEM signed the 25-year concession contract. It has since scored achievements in the areas of cost-effectiveness and technology.

In November 2010, the Government of Macau and CEM signed the Power Supply Contract Extension for 15 years. The new contract terms came into effect on 1 December 2010.

In 2014, Nam Kwong (Group) Company Limited purchased a 90% stake in Sino–French Energy Development Co. from Sino-French Holdings (Hong Kong) Ltd and became CEM's biggest shareholder.

In 2016, the Macau Power Station with a history of over 110 years was officially decommissioned.

== Transmission and distribution ==
The Macau electricity transmission network comprises 25 primary substations, 8 customer high-voltage switching stations and 953 kilometres of 66 kV, 110 kV and 220 kV high-voltage cables. The Macau electricity network is connected to China Southern Power Grid via two 110 kV cables and two 220 kV cables. The two 110 kV cables are connected to Gongbei Substation and Nanping Substation, while the two 220 kV cables are connected to Zhuhai Substations and Qinyun Substation.

The 11kV medium-voltage electricity transmission network comprises 41 customer switching stations and 1,502 customer substations (11 kV/400 V) connected by cables with a total length of 2,294 kilometres. The low-voltage transmission network is made up of 906 kilometres of cable, while the street lighting network comprises 571 kilometres of cable and about 11,105 streetlights. The power network of CEM consists almost entirely of underground cables.

== Performance ==
In 2018, according to CEM's annual report, the Average Service Availability Index (ASAI) was 99.9998%, while the Customer Average Interruption Duration Index was 6.56 minutes, achieving the goal of less than 20 minutes.

CEM adopted international management standards to ensure the compliance of sustainable development in the company. So far, CEM has been certified with the following international standards:

- ISO 14001 Environmental Management System, since 2003
- OHSAS 18001 Occupational Health and Safety Management System, since 2006
- ISO 9001 Quality Management System, since 2007
- ISO 14064 Greenhouse Gases Management System, since 2010
- ISO 20000 IT Service Management System, since 2013

== Generation ==
The actual capacity of CEM's generation consists of two power stations located on the Coloane Island, namely Coloane Power Station A (CCA) and Coloane Power Station B (CCB). The types of generation technology deployed are the low speed diesel generator (CCA) and the combined cycle gas turbine (CCB).

== Shareholders ==
Shares of CEM are currently owned by Nam Kwong Development (H.K.) Limited (42%), Energy Asia Consultancy (21%), Polytech Industrial (11%), Asiainvest - Investments (10%), Government of Macau (8%), China Power International Holding (6%) and other investors (2%).

Before 1987, the largest shareholder of CEM was the Government of Macau. But ever since that, the government had been reducing its share until the current 8%.

The former largest shareholder of CEM, Sino-French Energy Development, was majority owned by listed companies NWS Holdings and Suez Environnement via an intermediate holding company Sino-French Holdings (Hong Kong) Limited.

In 2014 Sino-French Holdings sold 90% stake in Sino French Energy Development to Chinese state-owned enterprise Nam Kwong Group (via its HK subsidiary Nam Kwong Development (H.K.) Limited); the remaining 10% stake of Sino-French Energy Development was owned by Hong Kong-Macau billionaire Stanley Ho. Sino-French Energy Development was merged with its direct parent company Nam Kwong Development in 2019.

Chinese Central government also owned another shareholder of CEM, China Power International Holding. That company was owned by State Power Investment Corporation (ex-China Power Investment Corporation).

== Organizational structures ==
- Customer Services Department
- Transmission and Distribution Department
- Generation Department
- Power and Networks Dispatch Department
- Finance Department
- Procurement and Logistics Department
- Human Resources and Sustainability Department
- Information Systems Department
- Regulatory Affairs and Corporate Communications Office

== See also ==
- Electricity sector in Macau
- List of power stations in Macau
