= UCEA =

UCEA could refer to:

- University Council for Educational Administration
- Universities and Colleges Employers Association

== See also ==
- Ucea, a commune in Romania
- Ucea (river), a river in Romania
