= Ucea–Victoria railway line =

Railway line in Romania

Overview
- Status: Freight traffic only
- Owner: CFR Infrastructură
- Locale: Brașov County, Romania; Historically also Făgăraș County
- Termini: Ucea; Victoria
- Stations: 1 Historically 4

Service
- Type: Standard gauge
- System: Căile Ferate Române
- Operator(s): Viromet S.A.

History
- Opened: 1939

Technical
- Line length: 9 km (5.6 mi)
- Number of tracks: 1
- Character: Industrial Branch line
- Track gauge: 1435 mm

The Ucea–Victoria railway line is a Romanian 9 km (5.6 mi) standard gauge single-track railway branching from Ucea railway station on CFR line 200, at 413 m (1,355 ft) above sea, and heading South towards Victoria city, at 591 m (1,939 ft) above sea.

It is currently used only for freight transport by Viromet S.A. in Victoria.

== History ==
=== Construction ===
The birth and development of the railway was closely linked to that of Ucea (later Ucea-Fabrică and then Victoria) town and chemical plant. As a preliminary work, by Decree-Law nr. 3456 from 20 September 1939, the Armament Endowment Ministry was allowed to lend CFR 90 million lei for repairing and strengthening the railway between Podu Olt and Ucea in order for it to sustain heavier traffic.

The birth certificate of the line was Decree-Law nr. 3667 from 7 October 1939, allowing the construction of a new railway line for Ucea-Fabrică in Făgăraș County. Thus, CFR was to build the line from Ucea de Jos to Ucea-Fabrică on behalf of the Armament Endowment Ministry. Every religious, art or charity institution on the way was allowed – and encouraged – to make available any necessary land. One month later, by Royal Decree 3991 from 7 November 1939, the line was declared public utility in the interest of national defense. Any expropriation necessary was expedited while at the same time any property of the State, Land or Commune on the way was to be ceded for free.

By the end of 1939, the line was operational, with the following characteristics:

- normal gauge single track; minimum curve radius of 300 m (980 ft); maximum grade slope of 25 ‰; 34.5 kg/m rails
- 37,500 m³ of embankments and track ballast; 15 small bridges, totaling 14 m (46 ft)
- 3 stations with station buildings for passengers (Ucea de Jos, Ucea de Sus, Ucea Fabrică); 5 section houses
- telephone line and signalling equipment
- build at a cost of approximately 5,750,000 lei/km

Until 1951 it held only freight traffic. In 1950–1951, the tracks were refurbished with 40 kg/m rails.

=== Passenger freights ===
By the Order 573/100 of Ministry of Transportation from 31 May 1951, from 1 June 1951 the line was officially opened for passenger traffic between Ucea and Ucea Fabrică, as Line 39 bis in the timetable, with the following stops:

- Corbi (halt) at 2.7 km (1.7 mi) from Ucea
- Ucea de Sus (halt) at 5.1 km (3.2 mi) from Ucea
- Ucea Colonie (halt) at 8.1 km (5.0 mi) from Ucea
- Ucea Fabrică (station) at 9.7 km (6.0 mi) from Ucea

For passengers, there were 4 pairs of mixed trains, increased to 5 in the following years and then reduced to 3 in 1956 and just 2 by 1959–60. All trains usually had a number of freight wagons, sometimes followed by 2 passenger wagons, and they were pulled by steam locomotives (CFR 326 series from 1939 to 1954, CFR 50.000 series from 1954 to 1966) or diesel locomotives (CFR LDM 20.000 series from 1940 to 1966, CFR DA 060 series and others after 1966).

Between 1952 and 1953, a new station, named Ucea (haltă), was built to the South of Colonia Ucea (future Victoria city), at kilometer 8.978. In 1953-54 Ucea Colonie station was reduced to a single track and the line between Ucea Colonie and Ucea Fabrică was dismantled, the latter station being closed. Thus, after passing Ucea Colonie, the trains entered Ucea (haltă) and with a pinched loop operation continued their way to the factory, on the old line, connected with Ucea (haltă) at kilometer 8.4.

In October 1955, by the Order 24177/1955 D.G.M./C., Corbi halt was moved at 3.5 km (2.2 mi) from Ucea, while Ucea Colonie and Ucea (haltă) were renamed Victoria (haltă) and Victoria respectively, reflecting the changes in the town's name. At the same time, Ucea Fabrică station was closed. Thus, the new stops on the Ucea–Victoria railway line were:

- Corbi (halt) at 3.5 km (2.2 mi) from Ucea
- Ucea de Sus (halt) at 5.1 km (3.2 mi) from Ucea
- Victoria (haltă) (halt) at 8.1 km (5.0 mi) from Ucea
- Victoria (station) at 8.8 km (5.5 mi) from Ucea

In 1960 all passenger traffic on the line has ceased, being taken over by a bus line. All intermediary stations between Ucea and Victoria were closed. In 1962 the line was renumbered as 225.

In 1969 the tracks were replaced with 49 kg/m rails, fixed on new concrete sleepers.

== Description ==
Freight traffic continues to this day on this line. In Ucea station, the line to Victoria branches from track 2, with track 1 as siding. After crossing DN1, the line heads South, by the side of DJ105C, to Victoria station where it enters on the main track 3. Tracks 1 and 2 are sidings in connection to Ucea, while track 4 heads only to the Chemical Plant (which is possible from the first three tracks as well). All switches in Victoria station are hand-operated. Inside the Chemical Plant, the railway complex measures approximately 21 km (13 mi) of tracks, with a local station, locomotives depot, and wagons revision facilities.

== Bibliography ==
- Bellu, Radu (1995). Mică monografie a căilor ferate din România, volume I (in Romanian). București: Filaret.
- 1930–1940: un deceniu de realizări C.F.R. (in Romanian). București: Editura Regiei Autonome C.F.R. 1940.
