= Băcilă =

Băcilă is a Romanian surname. Notable people with the surname include:

- Cosmin Băcilă, Romanian footballer
- Ilinca Băcilă, Romanian singer
- Traian Băcilă (1867–1931), Romanian general in the Austro-Hungarian Army
