= Sfântu Gheorghe Solar Park =

Photovoltaic power stations in Romania

- Country: Romania
- Location: Sfântu Gheorghe
- Coordinates: 45°51′N 25°47′E
- Status: Completed
- Commission date: 2012 (expected)
- Construction cost: €10 million

Solar farm
- Type: Flat-panel PV

Power generation
- Nameplate capacity: 2.4 MW
- Annual net output: 1 GWh

Sfântu Gheorghe Solar Park is a large thin-film photovoltaic (PV) power system on a 4 ha plot of land near the Sfântu Gheorghe city in Romania. The power plant is a 2.4-megawatt solar power system using state-of-the-art thin film technology, and was finished by the end of 2012. The solar park is expected to supply 1,000 MWh of electricity per year.

The installation will be in the Covasna County in central-eastern Romania. The investment cost for the Sfântu Gheorghe solar park amounts to some Euro 10 million.

== See also ==
- Energy policy of the European Union
- Photovoltaics
- Renewable energy commercialization
- Renewable energy in the European Union
- Solar power in Romania
