= Hydroelectricity in Romania =

Hydroelectricity in Romania is the second most important source of electricity generation in Romania, after fossil fuels.

Hidroelectrica plans to obtain a quotation in 2023 on the Bucharest Stock Exchange with an intention of raising $1 billion.

Hydroelectric production in Romania (TWh)
Year	Hydro productive	Total production	Percentage
1980	12.51	63.87	19.60%
1981	12.61	66.36	19.00%
1982	11.73	65.17	18.00%
1983	9.93	66.54	14.92%
1984	11.21	67.86	16.52%
1985	11.77	68.10	17.28%
1986	10.69	71.48	14.96%
1987	11.08	70.18	15.79%
1988	13.48	71.48	18.86%
1989	12.50	71.93	17.38%
1990	10.87	60.60	17.94%
1991	14.11	53.79	26.23%
1992	11.58	51.53	22.47%
1993	12.64	52.79	23.94%
1994	12.92	52.48	24.62%
1995	16.53	56.55	29.23%
1996	15.60	58.06	26.87%
1997	17.33	54.65	31.71%
1998	18.69	51.14	36.55%
1999	18.11	48.51	37.33%
2000	14.63	49.65	29.47%
2001	14.77	51.30	28.79%
2002	15.89	52.18	30.45%
2003	13.13	52.42	25.05%
2004	16.35	53.99	30.28%
2005	20.00	56.91	35.14%
2006	18.35	62.69	29.2%
2007	15.92	61.4	26%
2008	17.10	64.77	26.41%
2009	15.71	57.67	27.25%
2010	20.47	60.78	33.69%
2011	14.7	57.0	26%
2012	12.2	54.3	22%
2013	14.9	54.5	27%

== See also ==
- List of dams and reservoirs in Romania
- Energy in Romania
- Solar power in Romania
- Wind power in Romania
- Geothermal power in Romania
- Renewable energy by country
