= Ucea de Sus Solar Park =

Photovoltaic power stations in Romania

- Country: Romania
- Location: Ucea
- Coordinates: 45°42′20″N 24°41′35″E
- Status: Completed
- Commission date: 2013
- Construction cost: €100 million
- Owner: Hareon

Solar farm
- Type: Flat-panel PV

Power generation
- Units operational: 332,000
- Nameplate capacity: 82 MW
- Annual net output: 115 GWh

Ucea de Sus Solar Park is a large thin-film photovoltaic (PV) power system, built on a 200 ha (490 acres) plot of land located in Ucea in Romania. The solar park has around 332,000 state-of-the-art thin film PV panels for a total nameplate capacity of 82-megawatts, and was finished in December 2013. The solar park is expected to supply around 115 GWh of electricity per year enough to power some 126,000 average homes.

The installation is located in the Brașov County in central Romania in Ucea. The investment cost for the Ucea de Sus solar park amounts to some Euro 100 million.

== See also ==
- Energy policy of the European Union
- Photovoltaics
- Renewable energy commercialization
- Renewable energy in the European Union
- Solar power in Romania
