= Singureni Solar Park =

Photovoltaic power stations in Romania

- Country: Romania
- Location: Singureni
- Coordinates: 44°14′N 25°57′E
- Status: Operational
- Commission date: December 2010
- Construction cost: €3 million

Solar farm
- Type: Flat-panel PV

Power generation
- Units operational: 4176
- Nameplate capacity: 1 MW
- Annual net output: 1.3 GWh

Singureni Solar Park is a large thin-film photovoltaic power system built on a 5 ha (12 acres) plot of land near the Singureni commune in Romania. The power plant is a 1-megawatt solar power system using 4176 240 Watt-peak panels of state-of-the-art thin film technology. It was completed in December 2010. The solar park is expected to supply 1,300 MWh of electricity per year. Construction began in May 2010 and was completed in December 2010.

The installation is in the Giurgiu County in southern Romania. The investment cost for the Singureni solar park amounts to some €3 million.

== See also ==
- Energy policy of the European Union
- Photovoltaics
- Renewable energy commercialization
- Renewable energy in the European Union
- Solar power in Romania
