= Ucea =

- Commune
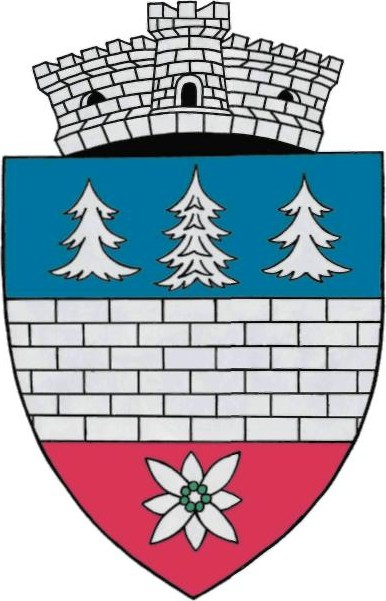
- Coat of arms

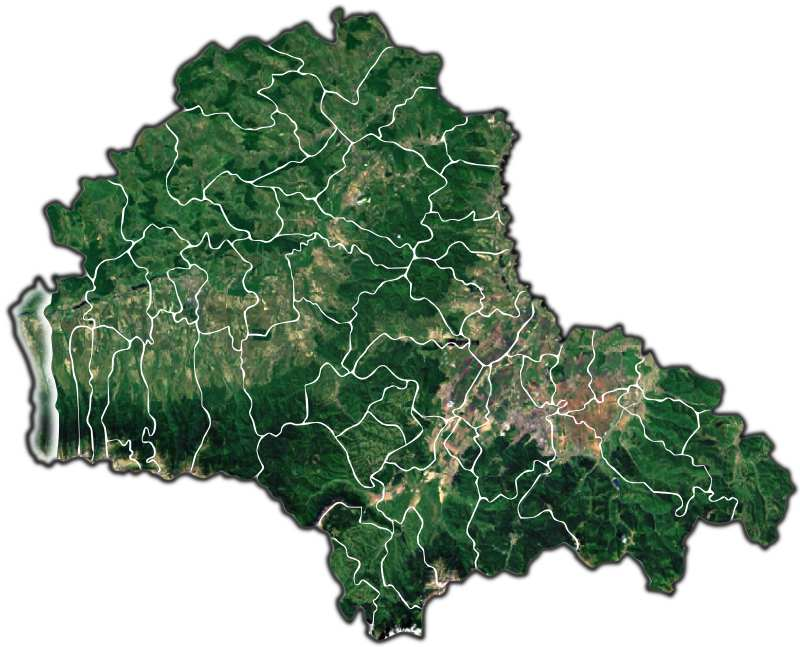
- Location within the county

- Location in Romania
- Coordinates: 45°44′N 24°41′E
- Country: Romania
- County: Brașov

Government
  - Mayor (2020–2024): Adrian-Constantin Grovu (PNL)
- Area: 102.18 km^{2} (39.45 sq mi)
- Elevation: 423 m (1,388 ft)
- Population (2021-12-01): 2,084
  - Density: 20.40/km^{2} (52.82/sq mi)
- Time zone: EET/EEST (UTC+2/+3)
- Postal code: 507235
- Area code: +(40) x68
- Vehicle reg.: BV
- Website: primariaucea.ro

Ucea (German: Gassendorf; Hungarian: Alsóucsa) is a commune in Brașov County, Transylvania, Romania. It is composed of four villages: Corbi (Korb), Feldioara (Földvár), Ucea de Jos (the commune center), and Ucea de Sus (Felsőucsa).

== Geography ==
The commune is located at the western edge of the county, on the border with Sibiu County, in the historic Țara Făgărașului region. It sits on the left bank of the Olt River, and is traversed south to north by the Ucea River, which flows into the Olt a short distance away.

== Transportation ==
Ucea de Jos is crossed by the DN1 road; Făgăraș is 25.7 km (16.0 mi) to the east while Sibiu is 52.7 km (32.7 mi) to the west.

The Ucea railway station serves the CFR Main Line 200, which runs from Brașov to the Hungarian border at Curtici. The Ucea–Victoria railway line branches off towards the city of Victoria, 9 km (5.6 mi) to the south.

== Demographics ==
Historical population
Year	Pop.	±%
1850	3,236	—
1956	3,026	−6.5%
2002	2,115	−30.1%
2011	2,195	+3.8%
2021	2,084	−5.1%
Source: Census data

At the 2021 census, the commune had a population of 2,084; of those, 87.5% were Romanians and 3% were Roma.

== See also ==
- Castra of Feldioara
- Ucea de Sus Solar Park
