= Iulian Popa =

Romanian footballer

Personal information
- Date of birth: 20 July 1984 (age 42)
- Place of birth: Victoria, Romania
- Height: 1.70 m (5 ft 7 in)
- Position: Attacking midfielder

Senior career*
Years	Team	Apps	(Gls)
2000–2002	Viromet Victoria	11	(2)
2002–2009	Forex Brașov	171	(53)
2009–2010	Râmnicu Vâlcea	10	(0)
2010–2012	Voința Sibiu	57	(12)
2012–2014	Brașov	31	(7)
2014–2015	Oțelul Galați	20	(1)
2015–2016	Rapid București	33	(16)
2016–2017	Brașov	26	(1)
2017–2018	Hermannstadt	10	(0)
Total		369	(92)

Managerial career
- 2018–2020: Hermannstadt (assistant)
- * Club domestic league appearances and goals as of 23 March 2020

Iulian Popa (born 20 July 1984) is a Romanian former footballer who played as an attacking midfielder. In his career Popa played for various Romanian clubs such as: Voința Sibiu, Brașov, Oțelul Galați, Rapid București or Hermannstadt, among others.

== Honours ==
Hermannstadt

- Cupa României: Runner-up 2017–18
