= Geothermal power in Romania =

Geothermal energy in Romania is mainly located, in the western part of the country, in the Banat region and the western part of the Apuseni Mountains with the most important source located in the Bihor County especially around the city of Oradea, that has been using geothermal energy for more than a hundred years. Theoretically Romania has the third highest potential geothermal capacity in Europe after Greece and Italy.

The direct-use heating has been mostly district heating serving 5,500 residences in Oradea and the city of Beiuş is the only city in Romania entirely heated by geothermal energy. Romania has a total of 200 drilled wells at depths between 800 m (2,600 ft) and 3,400 m (11,200 ft) and a capacity of 480 MWt with a utilisation of 7,975 TJ/year or 2,215 GWh/year.

== See also ==
- Energy in Romania
- Wind power in Romania
- Solar power in Romania
- Hydroelectricity in Romania
- Renewable energy by country
