= Castra of Feldioara =

Fort in the Roman province of Dacia

- Castra of Ucea (de Jos)
- Location within Romania
- 45.79841°N 24.69016°E
- Location: Feldioara, Brașov, Romania

History
- Founded: 101 or 102 AD
- Abandoned: 3rd century AD

Site notes
- Elevation: 405 m (1,329 ft)
- Excavation dates: 1973 - 1979
- Archaeologists: Nicolae Gudea; I. Pop
- Condition: Ruined

The castra of Feldioara was a fort in the Roman province of Dacia

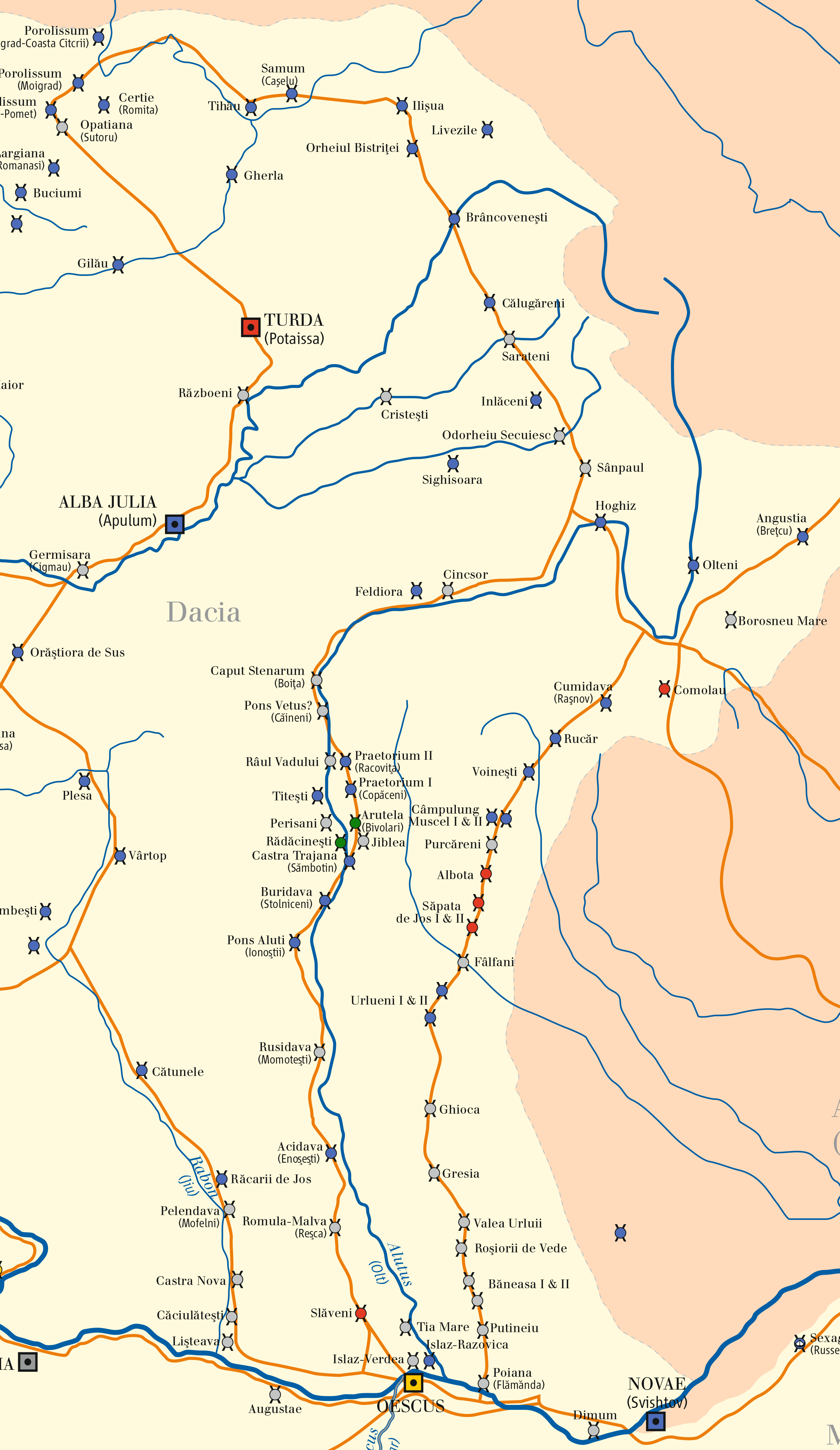
Limes Alutanus + Transalutanus

== See also ==
- List of castra
