= Izvoarele Solar Park =

Photovoltaic power stations in Romania

- Country: Romania
- Location: Izvoarele
- Coordinates: 44°3′N 25°48′E
- Status: Completed
- Commission date: 2013
- Construction cost: €77 million
- Owner: LJG Green Energy Source Gamma

Solar farm
- Type: Flat-panel PV

Power generation
- Units operational: 215,000
- Nameplate capacity: 50 MW
- Annual net output: 70 GWh

Izvoarele Solar Park is a large thin-film photovoltaic (PV) power system, built on a 125 ha (310 acres) plot of land located in Izvoarele in Romania. The solar park has around 215,000 state-of-the-art thin film PV panels for a total nameplate capacity of 50-megawatts, and was finished in September 2013. The solar park is expected to supply around 70 GWh of electricity per year enough to power some 77,000 average homes.

The installation is located in the Giurgiu County in southern Romania in Izvoarele. The investment cost for the Slobozia solar park amounts to some Euro 77 million.

== See also ==
- Energy policy of the European Union
- Photovoltaics
- Renewable energy commercialization
- Renewable energy in the European Union
- Solar power in Romania
