= Wind power in Romania =

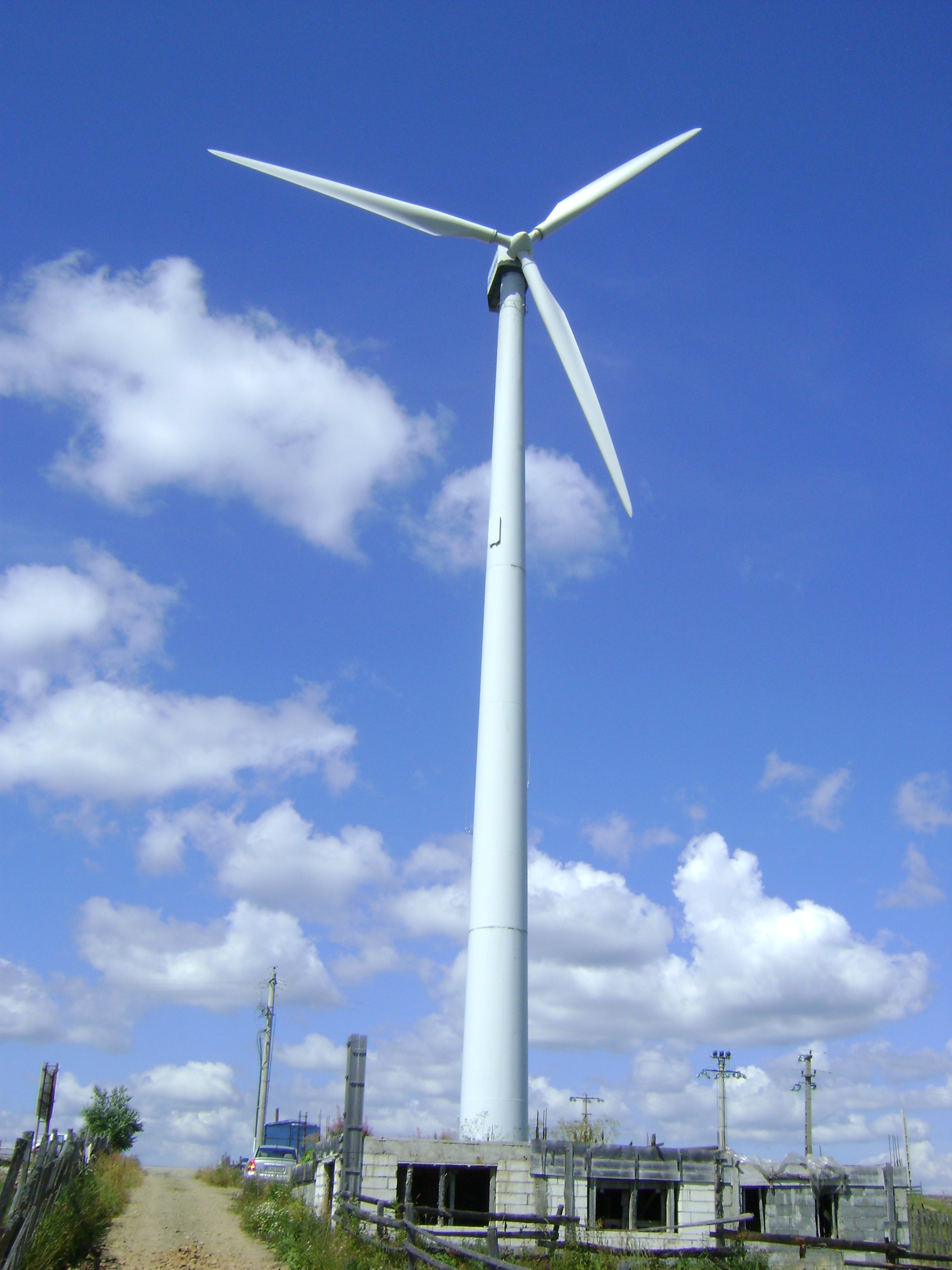
Tihuţa Pass wind turbine

Wind power installed capacity in Romania (MW)

Electricity generation from renewables in Romania in Terawatt-hours from 2015-01 to 2026-09

Wind power in Romania has total cumulative installed capacity of 3,028 MW as of the end of 2016, up from the 14 MW installed capacity in 2009.

Romania has the highest wind potential in continental Europe of 14,000 MW; in 2009 investors already had connection requests of 12,000 MW and the national electricity transport company Transelectrica offered permits for 2,200 MW. A study of Erste Bank places Romania and especially the Dobrogea Region with Constanța and Tulcea counties as the second best place in Europe (after Scotland) to construct wind farms due to its large wind potential. Another study made by the Romanian Energy Institute (REI) said that wind farms could contribute with 13 GW to the national power generation capacity by 2020, and between 2009 and 2017 total wind farm capacity will comprise 4,000 MW with investments of US$5.6 billion.

Potential offshore wind farms may increase supply. Romania passed a law in November 2020 to support offshore wind power. Black Sea 1 farm is planned with a capacity of 500 MW and Black Sea 2 farm is planned for 1,400 MW to be built 2027-28

By 2021 wind power had risen to 17% of total installed power generation capacity and 13% of total power generation.

A 2022 law prohibits wind farms covering an area larger than 50 hectares, limiting farms to 45MW, unless the development is designated "of national interest". This limits private investment.

In 2022 there were three wind farm projects proposed, by Rezolv Energy, 450MW, OX2 plans a 99.2MW and ACK Pașcani is looking to install up to 60 MW.

Wind power in Romania
Year	Total (MWp)	Production (GWh)	% of electricity consumption
2008	3		
2009	14		
2010	462		
2011	982	1,073	1.8%
2012	1,905	2,684	4.6%
2013	2,599	4,800	8.6%
2014	2,954	5,618	10.0%
2015	2,976	6,703	11.6%
2016	3,028	6,385	10.9%
2017	3,029	7,301	12.2%
2018	3,029	6,226	10.2%
2019	3,032	6,322	10.2%

== See also ==
- List of wind farms in Romania
- Energy in Romania
- Solar power in Romania
- Geothermal power in Romania
- Hydroelectricity in Romania
- Renewable energy by country
