= Ucea (river) =

- Location within Romania

Location
- Country: Romania
- Counties: Brașov County
- Villages: Victoria, Ucea de Sus

Physical characteristics
- Mouth: Olt
  - location: Ucea de Jos
  - coordinates: 45.7979°N 24.6561°E
- Length: 24 km (15 mi)
- Basin size: 37 km^{2} (14 sq mi)

Basin features
- Progression: Olt→ Danube→ Black Sea
- Tributaries
  - left: Fântâna, Ucișoara Seacă
  - right: Ucișoara

The Ucea is a left tributary of the river Olt in Romania. It discharges into the Olt in Ucea de Jos. The upper reach of the river is sometimes identified as the Ucea Mare. It flows through the town of Victoria. Its length is 24 km (15 mi) and its basin size is 37 km^{2} (14 sq mi).
