= Târgu Cărbunești Solar Park =

Solar power plant in Romania

- Country: Romania
- Location: Târgu Cărbunești
- Coordinates: 44.9323149°N 23.5392844°E
- Status: Completed
- Commission date: 2013
- Construction cost: €35 million

Solar farm
- Type: Flat-panel PV

Power generation
- Units operational: 80,000
- Nameplate capacity: 20 MW
- Annual net output: 28 GWh

Târgu Cărbunești Solar Park is a large thin-film photovoltaic (PV) power system, built on a 50 ha (120 acres) plot of land located in Târgu Cărbunești in Romania. The solar park has around 80,000 state-of-the-art thin film PV panels for a total nameplate capacity of 20-megawatts, and was finished in July 2013. The solar park is expected to supply around 28 GWh of electricity per year enough to power some 31,000 average homes.

The installation is located in the Gorj County in southern Romania in Târgu Cărbunești. The investment cost for the Slobozia solar park amounts to some Euro 35 million.

== See also ==
- Energy policy of the European Union
- Photovoltaics
- Renewable energy commercialization
- Renewable energy in the European Union
- Solar power in Romania
