= Solar power in Romania =

Electricity production in Romania via solar energy

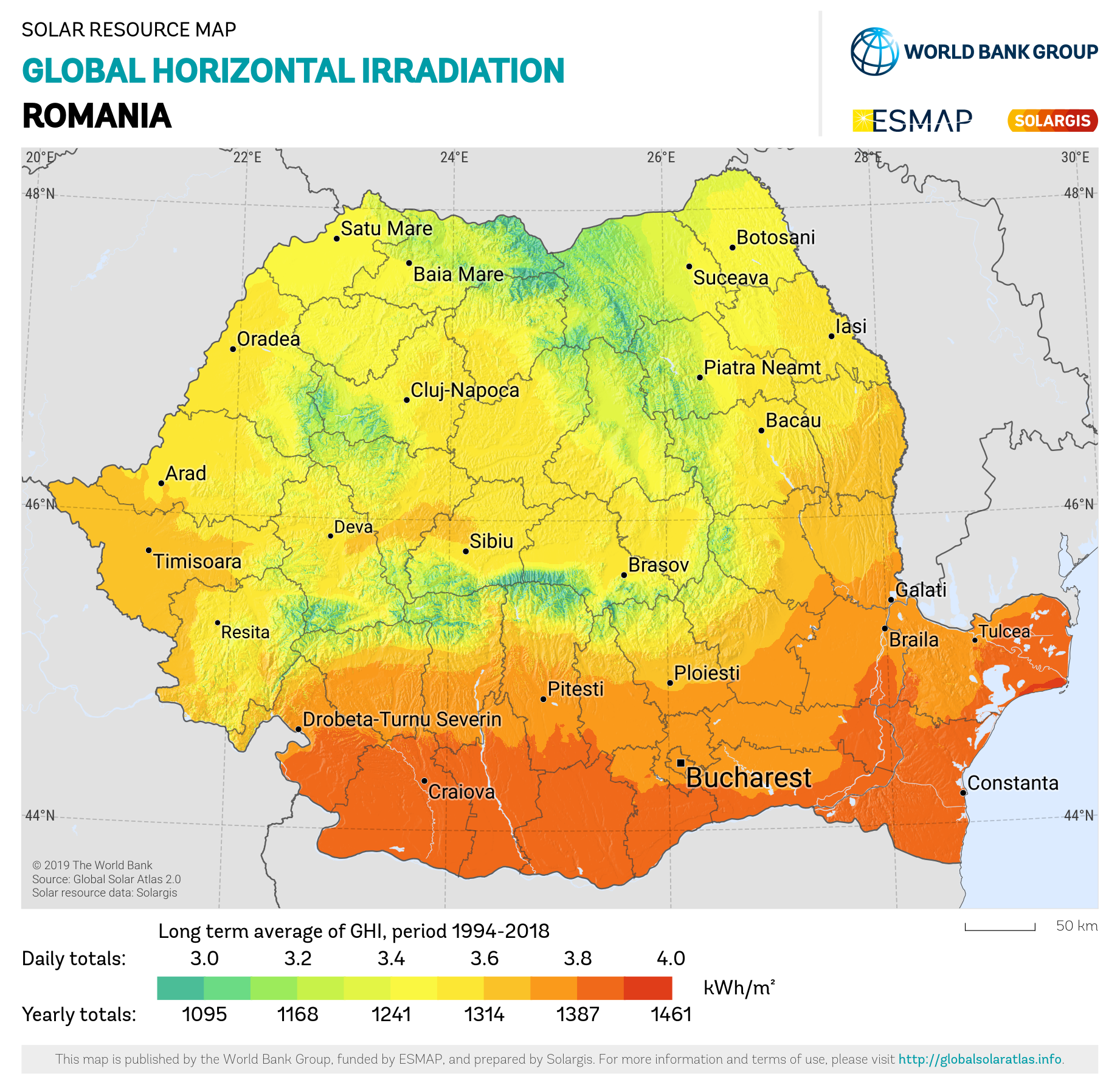
Solar insolation in Romania

Solar power in Romania had an installed capacity of 1,374 megawatt (MW) as of the end of 2017. The country had in 2007 an installed capacity of 0.30 MW, which increased to 3.5 MW by the end of 2011, and to 6.5 MW by the end of 2012. However, the record year of 2013 was an exception, and new installation fell back from 1,100 MW to a moderate level of 69 MW in 2014.

Romania is located in an area with a good solar potential of 210 sunny days per year and with an annual solar energy flux between 1,000 kWh/m^{2}/year and 1,300 kWh/m^{2}/year. From this total amount around 600 to 800 kWh/m^{2}/year is technically feasible. The most important solar regions of Romania are the Black Sea coast, Northern Dobruja and Oltenia with an average of 1,600 kWh/ m^{2}/year.

== History ==
Romania was a major player in the solar power industry, installing in the 1970s and 1980s around 800,000 m^{2} (8,600,000 ft^{2}) of low quality solar collectors that placed the country third worldwide in the total surface area of PV cells. One of the most important solar projects was the installation of a 30 kW solar panel on the roof of the Politehnica University of Bucharest that is capable of producing 60 MWh of electricity per year.

Rominterm, a Romanian company, by 2010, installed a total of 600 solar panels in Mangalia, Constanța County making the city self-sufficient in terms of heated water during the summer months and providing around 70% of heated water in the winter months and another 1,150 solar panels used for the generation of electricity spread over an area of 1,400 m^{2} (15,000 ft^{2}). Another Romanian city, Alba Iulia, installed a total of 1,700 PV cells on several public buildings that have a rated power of 257 kW. Other cities include Giurgiu with 174 solar panels and 391.5 kW installed capacity and Saturn with 50 panels and 112 kW installed capacity.

The first two industrial scale solar power plants in the country are the Singureni Solar Park completed in December 2010, and the Scornicesti Photovoltaic Park, completed 27 December 2011. Each is 1 MW.

2023 saw the first hybrid farm, with the installation of a 1.1 MW photovoltaic power plant on wind farm land, giving a combined capacity of 7.25 MW, with a total investment of EUR 10 million. It is planned to add solar units to other wind farms over the next few years as the decreased solar output in winter balances the higher wind output in winter whilst utilising the same grid connections.

== Installed PV capacity and yearly production ==
Electricity generation from renewables in Romania in Terawatt-hours from 2015-01 to 2026-09

History of PV deployment
Year	Total (MW_{p})	Added (MW_{p})	Production (GWh)	% of electricity consumption
2006	0.19	n.a.	n.a.	n.a.
2007	0.30	0.1	n.a.	n.a.
2008	0.45	0.15	n.a.	n.a.
2009	0.64	0.3	n.a.	n.a.
2010	1.94	1	n.a.	n.a.
2011	3.5	2	n.a.	n.a.
2012	51	47	8	0%
2013	1,151	1,100	398	0.25%
2014	1,219	69	1,295	1.53%
2015	1,302	83	1,328	2.14%
2016	1,372	70	1,820	2.14%
2017	1,374	2	1,856	2.26%
2018	1,386	2.9	1,860	2.21%
2019	1,398			
2020	1,383			
2021	1,394			
2022	1,809			
2023	2,988			
2024	4,258			
2025	6,238			
Source: latest IEA-PVPS, previous

== Projects ==
In 2023 20 solar projects were operational or planned, the largest operational being:

- Ucea de Sus Solar Park – Brasov County - 82 MW
- Sebiș Solar Park – Sebis, Arad County - 65 MW
- Livada Solar Park – Satu Mare County - 56 MW
- Izvoarele Solar Park – Giurgiu County - 50 MW
- Slobozia Solar Park – Giurgiu County - 45 MW
- Târgu Cărbunești Solar Park – Gorj County - 20 MW
- Bucșani Solar Park – Giurgiu County - 10 MW
- Pilu-Grăniceri solar power plant – Ottlaka and Graničar – 1.04 GW
- Horia-Arad 365 MW

== Government support ==
The Romanian State supports the production of solar / PV energy by offering six green certificates for each MWh produced and injected into the grid. One green certificate will be traded on a regulated market (i.e. OPCOM) with a price that varies between EUR 27 to EUR 55 per green certificate, subject to indexation with the Euro zone inflation rate. However, due to the reduction of the cost of technology, the Romanian Energy Regulatory Body (i.e. ANRE) considers reducing the number of green certificate in the first half of 2012. In order to protect the interest of the solar / PV producers and for an appropriate guidance through the Romanian RES-E issues, the Romanian Photovoltaic Industry Association was created. Solar / PV energy is expected to be the second most active developed source of energy, after wind.

== See also ==
- Photovoltaics
- Growth of photovoltaics
- Solar power by country
- Solar power in the European Union
- Energy in Romania
- Wind power in Romania
- Geothermal power in Romania
- Hydroelectricity in Romania
- Renewable energy by country
