= Energy policy of Romania =

Romania is the 38th largest energy consumer in the world and the largest in South Eastern Europe as well as an important producer of natural gas, oil and coal in Europe.

The total energy consumption of Romania was in 2005 40.5 million toe structured as follows:

- 36.4% – natural gas
- 25.1% – oil and derivates
- 22.4% – coal and coke
- 16.1% – hydro and others

Greenhouse gas-wise, Romania is slightly greener than neighbouring countries due to its hydroelectric, nuclear and increasingly its wind plants. The Romanian government encourages further greenhouse gas emissions reductions through strong support to nuclear power as well as renewable energies in accordance with European and international experts.

== Reserves ==
Romania's natural resources in the year 2007 were structured as follows:

- Oil: 550 million tonnes.
- Natural gas: 185 billion m^{3}
- Bituminous coal: 755 million tonnes
- Lignite: 1.49 billion tonnes

Romania has the largest oil reserves in Central and Eastern Europe (except Russia) and the second largest natural gas reserves (except Russia) behind Ukraine but twice as large than Poland but it has the smallest reserves of coal in the region.

=== Oil ===
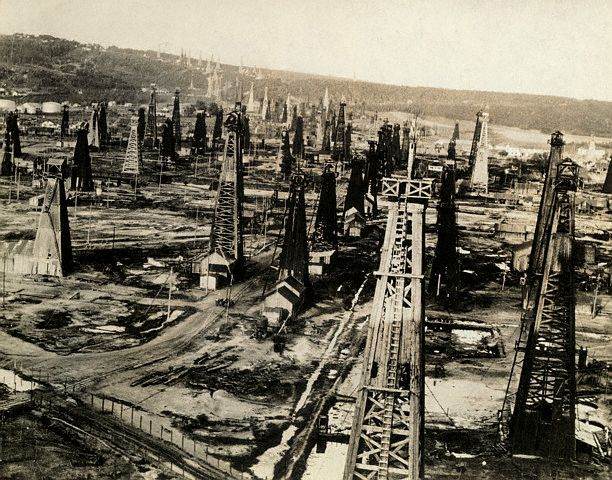
Petroleum field in WW II

Romania's oil production in 2007 was around 120,000 bbl/d while the consumption of oil was around 230,000 bbl/d.

Romania had the largest oil production in the year 1976 when the total quantity extracted was close to 14.7 million tonnes. Since then the oil production increased and decreased regularly but in the last 10 years the production had a descending path.

Year	2006	2005	2004	2003	2002	2001	2000	1999	1998	1997
Thousand tonnes	5.000	5.200	5.541	5.650	5.702	5.810	6.029	6132	6.300	6.501

=== Coal ===
In 2006 the total coal production of Romania was 34.1 million tonnes of which:

- Bituminous coal: 2.9 million tonnes
- Lignite: 31.2 million tonnes

Almost all the coal extracted in the country is used for electricity generation, bituminous coal having a 7.2% contribution in all electricity produced in Romania and lignite having a 32.2% stake.

Evolution of bituminous coal production:

Year	2006	2005	2004	2003	2002	2001	2000
Million tonnes	2,9	2,7	3,1	3	3,7	3,5	3

Evolution of lignite production:

Year	2006	2005	2004	2003	2002	2001	2000
Million tonnes	31,2	27,2	29,1	30	29,3	29,7	26

=== Natural gas ===
In 2007 Romania produced a total of 12.3 billion m^{3} of natural gas the most important producers being Petrom with 6.3 billion m^{3} and Romgaz with 6 billion m^{3}.

The natural gas consumption in 2007 was 17.4 billion m^{3} with the local producers providing around 70% and imports of 5.1 billion m^{3} supplying the rest.

== Electricity ==
Romania electricity production by year

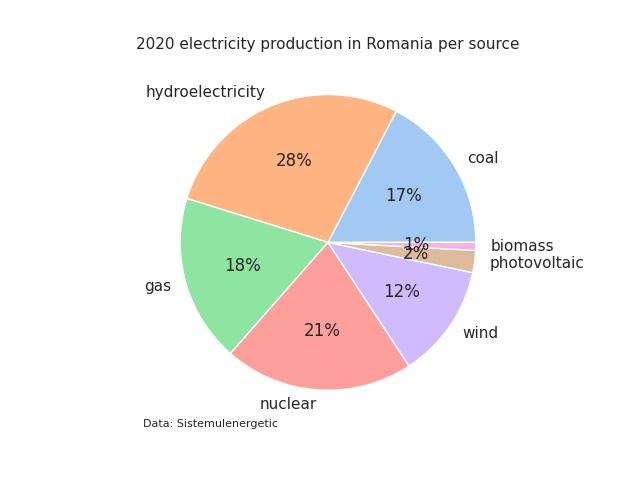
Electricity in Romania

In 2006 Romania produced a total of 62 TWh of electricity having an installed capacity of 17,360 MW in thermal, hydro and nuclear power plants. The power generation was structured as follows:

Fuel	Percentage 2006	Percentage 2005	Percentage 2004
Coal	39,57%	35,80%	37,55%
Natural gas	16,69%	14,07%	16,01%
Coke	1,83%	2,68%	3,26%
Nuclear	9,20%	9,59%	10,07%
Hydro	32,02%	37,11%	31,61%
Other conventional sources	0,68%	0,75%	1,50%
Wind	0,00%	0,00%	0,00%
Solar	0,00%	0,00%	0,00%
Biomass	0,00%	0,00%	0,00%

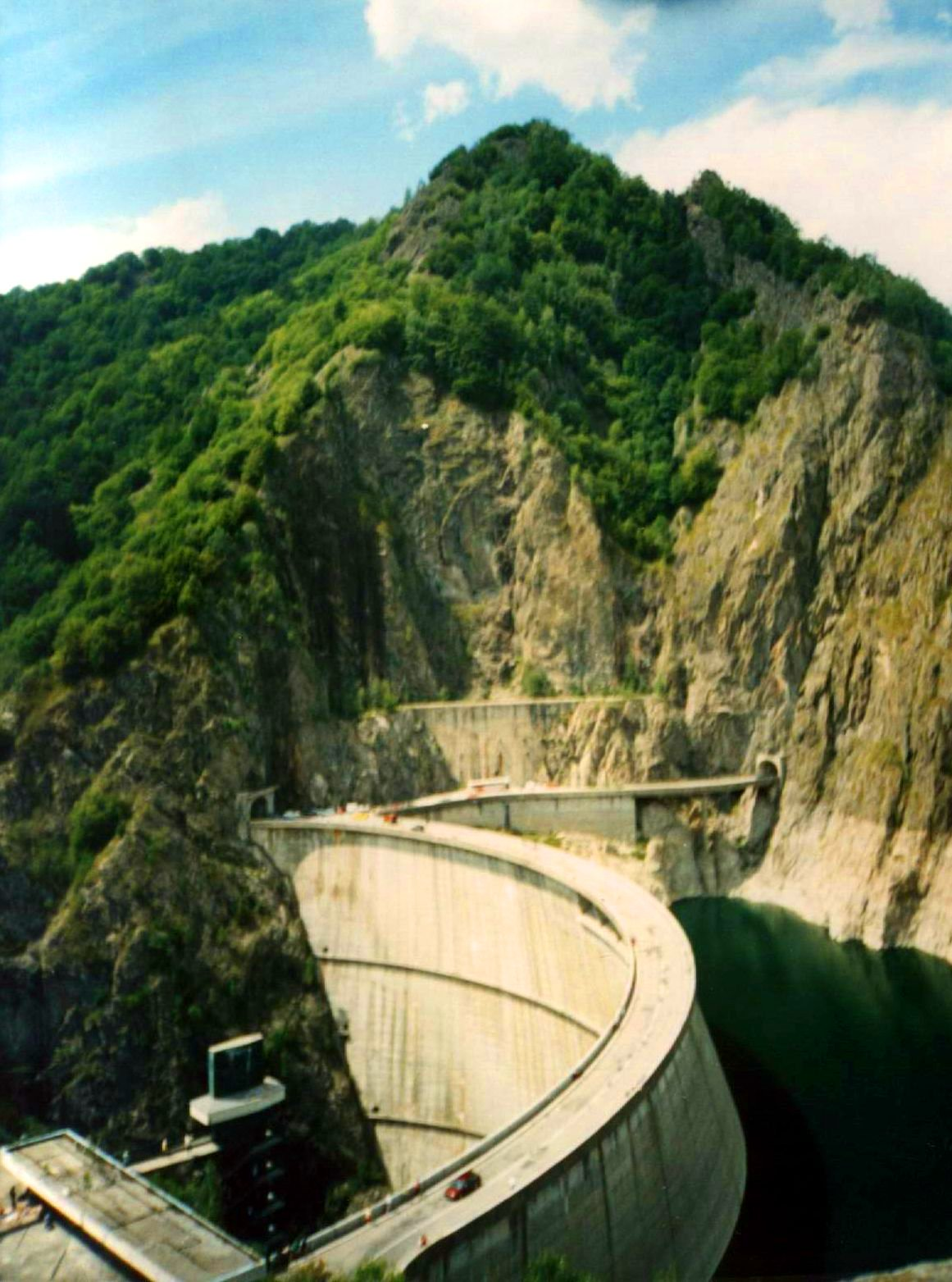
Vidraru Dam

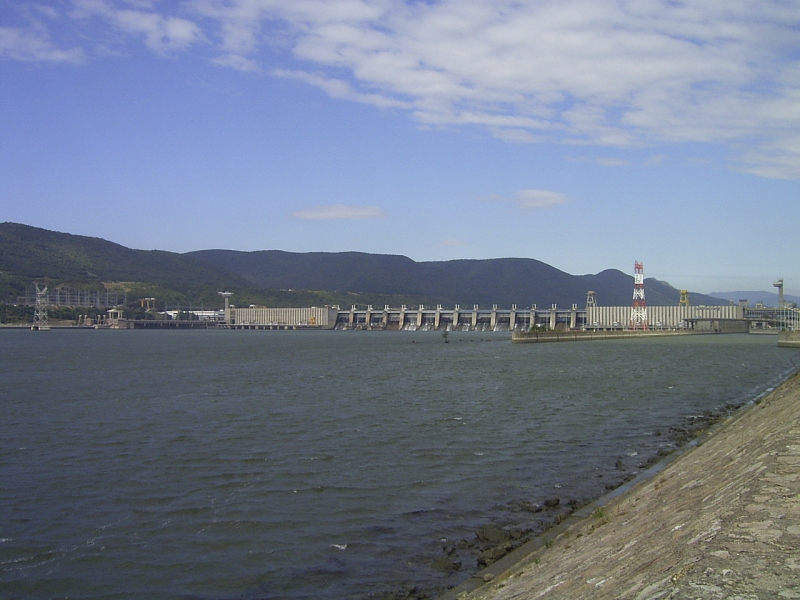
Iron Gate I Dam

=== Hydropower ===
Romania has an estimated total usable hydropower of 36,000 GWh per year. In 2007 the total installed capacity of hydropower plants in Romania was 6,400 MWh all of which were owned by Hidroelectrica.

In 2007, Romania produced 19.8 TWh of hydropower. Romania co-owns the Iron Gate I Hydroelectric Power Station on the Danube River located on the border between Romania and Serbia, which is one of the largest hydroelectric power plants in Europe with an installed generation capacity of 2,216 MW by 6 generating units of 175 MW each on the Serbian side and 6 generating units of 194.4 MW on the Romanian side.

The two countries also jointly operate the Iron Gate II Hydroelectric Power Station with an installed generation capacity of 537 MW by 8 generating units of 27 MW on the Serbian side and 10 generating units of 32 MW on the Romanian side.

The largest hydropower plant on the inner rivers of Romania is the Lotru-Ciunget Hydroelectric Power Station with an installed generation capacity of 510 MW but this power plant will be surpassed by the Tarnița – Lăpuștești Hydroelectric Power Station which at completion in 2014 will have an installed generation capacity of 1,000 MW.

=== Nuclear energy ===
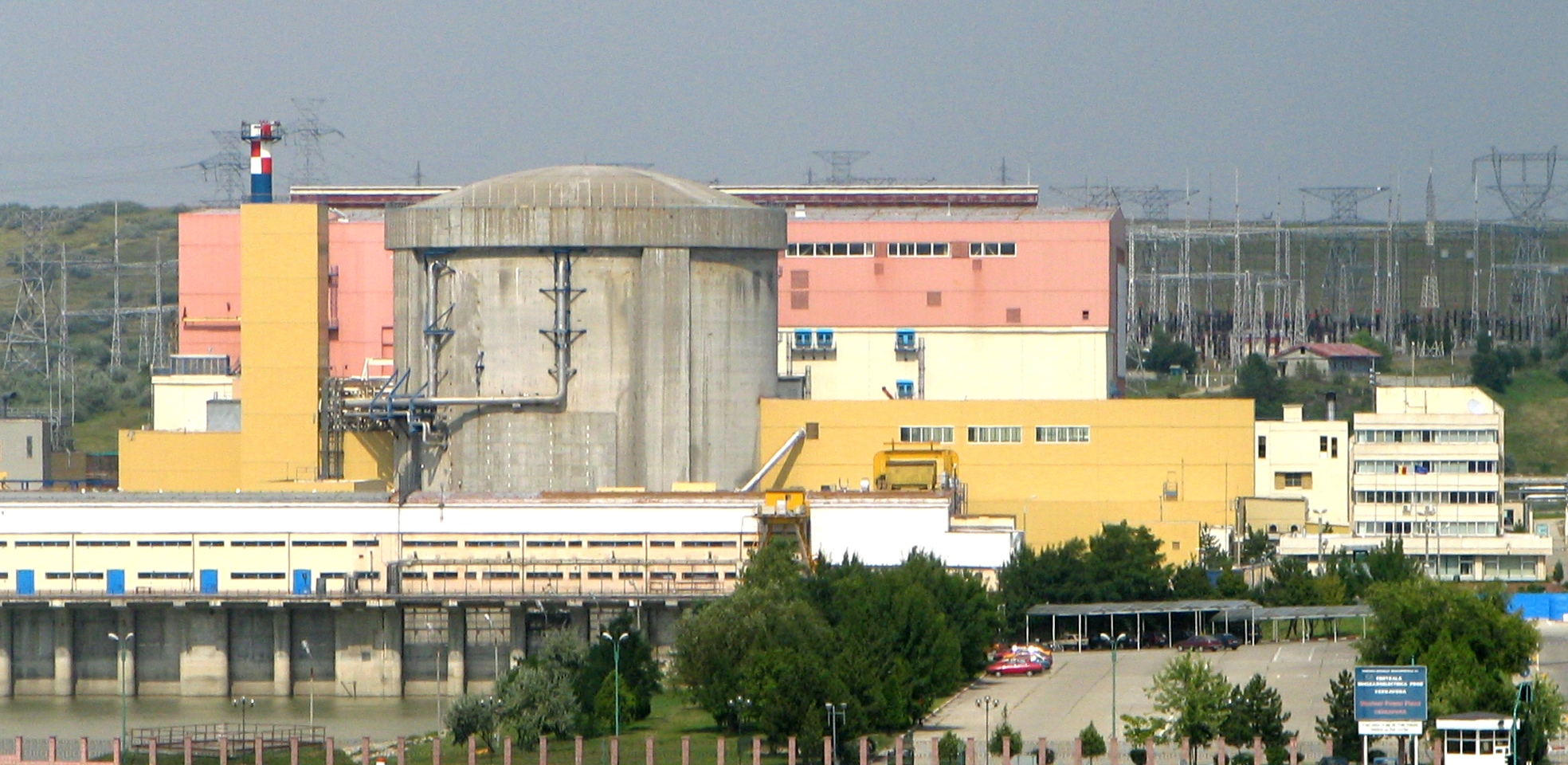
Cernavodă Nuclear Power Plant

Romania currently has 1,400 MW of nuclear power capacity by means of one active nuclear power plant with 2 reactors, which makes up to around 18% of the national power generation capacity of the country. This makes Romania the 23rd largest user of nuclear power in the world.

The Cernavodă Nuclear Power Plant (Romanian: Centrala Nucleară de la Cernavodă) is the only nuclear power plant in Romania. It uses CANDU reactor technology from AECL, using heavy water produced at Drobeta-Turnu Severin as its neutron moderator and water from the Danube for cooling.

There are also plans for the construction of a second nuclear power plant in Transylvania that will either have 2 reactors of 1,200 MW each or 4 reactors of 600 MW each with an electricity generating capacity of 2,400 MW and will be constructed after 2020

=== Wind power ===
As of 2007, Wind power in Romania has an installed capacity of 10 MW, up from the 3 MW installed capacity in 2006.

Romania has a high wind power potential of around 14,000 MW and a power generating capacity of 23 TWh, but until 2007 there were no significant wind farms in operation.

=== Other renewable energy ===
The annual energy potential for renewable energy in Romania is:

- Wind energy: 23 TWh
- Hydropower: 36 TWh
- Solar energy: 1.2 TWh electricity and 16.7 TWh thermal energy
- Geothermal energy: 1.9 TWh
- Biomass and Biogas: 88.3 TWh

== Biofuels ==
In recent years Romania increased its production of biofuels in a sustained manner. The country uses rapeseed as a source of biodiesel. In 2007 Romania had a total cultivated area of 430,000 ha with Rapeseed and had a production of 750,000 tonnes.

In 2007 Romania produced 400,000 tonnes of biodiesel mainly from rapeseed and sunflower seeds.

The German company MAN Ferrostaal invested US$200 million in the construction of a biodiesel refinery in Sibiu County that produces around 142,000 tonnes of biodiesel per year.

There are other companies that are interested in investing in biodiesel in Romania like the Martifer Group in Portugal that will build a biodiesel refinery in Călărași County where it will invest US$120 million.

When this refinery will be at full capacity, Romania will be in the top ten biodiesel producing countries in the world.

== See also ==
- Energy in Romania
