= Energy in Romania =

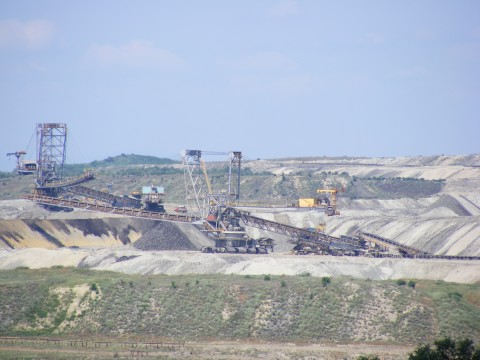
Coal Mine, Pinoasa Gorj-Romania

Energy in Romania describes energy production, consumption and import in Romania.

Romania has significant oil and gas reserves, substantial coal deposits and it has considerable installed hydroelectric power.

== Overview ==
Electric power in Romania is dominated by government enterprises, although privately operated coal mines and oil refineries also existed. Accordingly, Romania placed an increasingly heavy emphasis on developing nuclear power generation. Electric power was provided by the Romanian Electric Power Corporation (CONEL). Energy sources used in electric power generation consisted primarily of nuclear, coal, oil, and liquefied natural gas (LNG).

In 2025, Romania's electricity generation had a predominantly low-carbon profile, with around 66% coming from clean energy sources. Nuclear power accounted for about 21% of generation, hydropower 24%, wind 12% and solar 5%, while fossil fuels accounted for about 34%.

== Statistics ==
2020 energy statistics

Natural Gas (billion m^{3})
Consumption	11.09
Production	10.37
Import	2.80
Export	0.01

Crude Oil (barrels per day)
Consumption	222,200
Production	74,000
Import	161,600
Export	1,400

CO_{2} emissions:
68.66 million tons

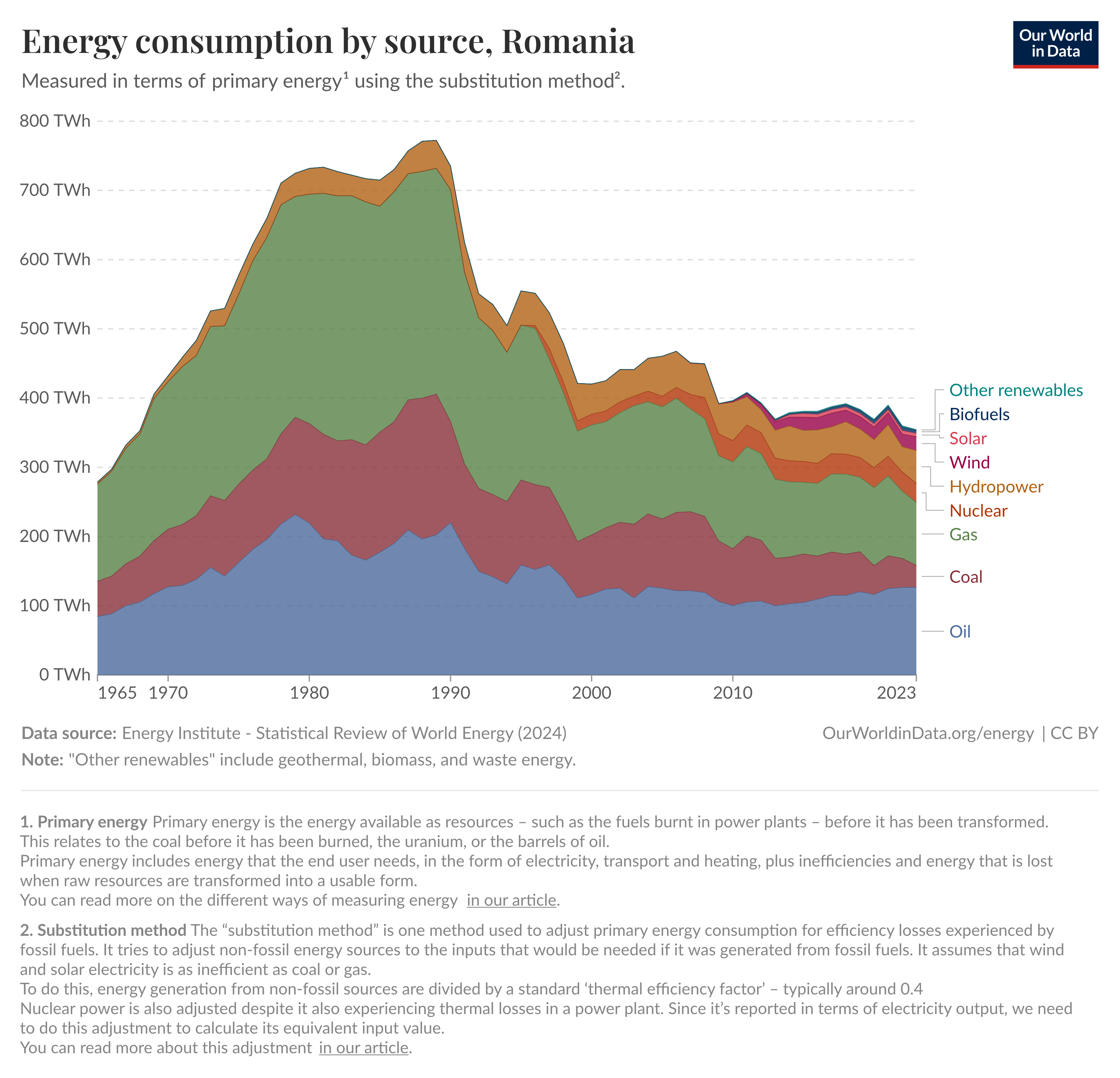

== Energy strategy ==
A review of the energy strategy took place in 2022.

Gas production currently around 25m m3/d with a potential for increase from the 100billion m3 on shore reserves. Offshore reserves are estimated at 40billion m3. There is a potential for LNG production and Romania could become a major energy supplier to Europe.

Renewable energy:

- 208 hydrological plants produce about 30% of Romania's energy.
- Wind, photovoltaic and biomass produce 16% of Romania's energy and is expected to rise to 30%.

Nuclear energy: Currently producing around 20% of Romanian needs, two new reactors are scheduled to be built with help from the USA.

Interconnectivity: Improved connections for the supply of gas and electricity to/from neighbouring countries are planned.

== Fossil fuels ==
=== Oil ===
Romania's oil production peaked in the 1970s.

Romania's gas production peaked in the 1980s.

Possessing substantial oil refining capacities, Romania is particularly interested in the Central Asia – Europe pipelines and seeks to strengthen its relations with some Persian Gulf states. Refining capacity was reduced by 2018, with just 5 refineries remaining and an overall refining capacity of approximately 13.7Mt per annum. Romania's refining capacity far exceeds domestic demand for refined petroleum products, allowing the country to export a wide range of oil products and petrochemicals—such as lubricants, bitumen, and fertilizers—throughout the region.

=== Gas ===
Romania has large natural gas reserves and produces most of the gas for the country's needs.

The national natural gas transmission system in Romania is owned by Transgaz a state-owned company.

Interconnector pipelines connect Romania with Hungary, Bulgaria, Ukraine and onward connections to Turkey, Greece, North Macedonia, Azerbaijan and Austria.

== Electric power ==
About 15% of the final consumption of energy in Romania is consumed as electricity.

In accordance with EU directives and climate control ambitions, additional effort and money was put into improving renewable energy sources. The target of 24% renewable energy was reached in 2020.

Since the 2022 Russian Invasion of Ukraine the need to strengthen and diversify sources of electricity was given a boost. A target of 30.7% renewable energy generation has been set, to be achieved by 2030; however there are plans to increase this to 34%.

Consumption in 2022 was 51.7089 TWh (terawatt hours), 7.2% less than 2021. 7.3251 million TWh were exported in 2022.

In 2022 and 2023 improved connections were with neighbouring Moldova, bringing it into the European grid, with Romania supplying Moldova with electricity.

Electricity transmission system operator Transelectrica is scheduled to have a 3 GW wind energy capacity by 2026. 1.9 GW of offshore wind is planned for 2027-28. A 200 MW / 400 MWh grid battery was connected in 2025, and a €460 million 761 MWp / 534 MW AC solar park with 1 GWh battery started construction in 2026.

== Nuclear ==
Romania has two nuclear reactors located at Cernavodă with 1,300 MW capacity, the first became operational in 1996, the second in 2007. In 2020 nuclear produced 11.5 TWh of electricity, being 20% of Romania's electricity generation.

Nuclear waste is stored on site at reprocessing facilities.

== Renewable energy ==
Years in which the last three renewable power levels achieved
Achievement	Year	Achievement	Year	Achievement	Year
10%	1996	15%	1997	20%	2008

Renewable energy includes wind, solar, biomass and geothermal energy sources.

=== Solar power ===
Solar power expanded in 2013 but for the next 10 years remained fairly static with around 1,300 MW capacity. Plans from 2023 include a doubling of capacity after the law was changed in 2023 making it easier to obtain planning permission.

=== Biomass ===
Biomass provides around 1% of electricity generation capacity.

== Climate change ==
Development of carbon dioxide emissions

In the decade between 1989 and 1999, Romania saw decrease of its greenhouse gas emissions by 55%. This can be accounted for by a 45% decrease in energy use due to languishing economy, and a 15% decrease in its carbon intensity of energy use. In this period of time the carbon intensity of Romania's economy decreased by 40%, while Romania's GDP declined 15%. Romania's GDP has recovered significantly since then.

There has been a big push towards renewable energy.

== See also ==
- Energy policy of Romania
- Geothermal power in Romania
- Hydroelectricity in Romania
- Renewable energy by country
