= Cosmin Băcilă =

Romanian footballer

Personal information
- Full name: Cosmin Nicolae Băcilă
- Date of birth: 10 September 1983 (age 43)
- Place of birth: Victoria, Romania
- Height: 1.72 m (5 ft 7 1/2 in)
- Position: Midfielder

Team information
- Current team: ASA Târgu Mureș
- Number: 8

Senior career*
Years	Team	Apps	(Gls)
2004–2005	FC Ghimbav	11	(0)
2005–2006	Forex Brașov	28	(3)
2006–2009	Farul Constanța	100	(15)
2009–2010	Internațional	29	(5)
2010–2013	Pandurii Târgu Jiu	38	(2)
2013–2015	Târgu Mureș	1	(0)
Total		207	(25)
- * Club domestic league appearances and goals as of 17 July 2018

Cosmin Nicolae Băcilă (born 10 September 1983) is a Romanian former professional footballer. On 18 September 2011, Băcilă suffered a broken left tibia and fibula following a tackle by Florin Gardoș in a match between Pandurii and Steaua București. He underwent surgery at Spitalul Universitar de Urgenţă Elias in Bucharest, on 20 September, and was released from the hospital three days later.

== Honours ==
=== Club ===
Pandurii

- Liga I (1): runner-up 2013
