= Victoria, Brașov =

Victoria
- Town
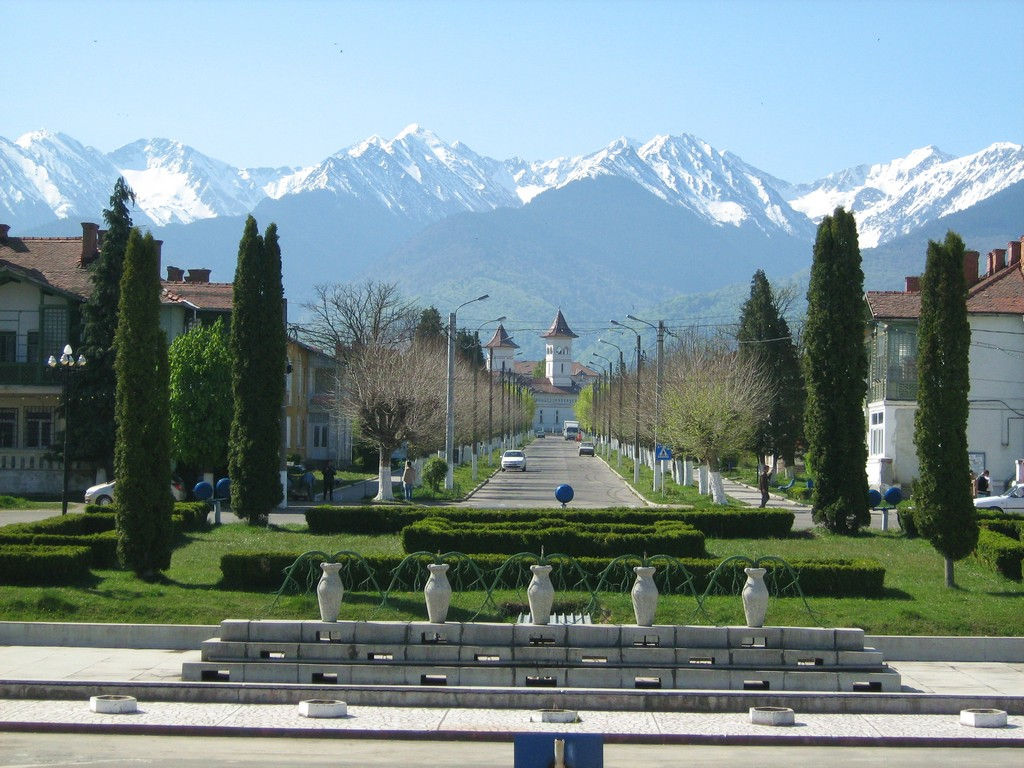
- View of the town, with the Făgăraș Mountains in the background

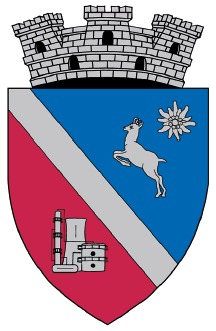
- Coat of arms

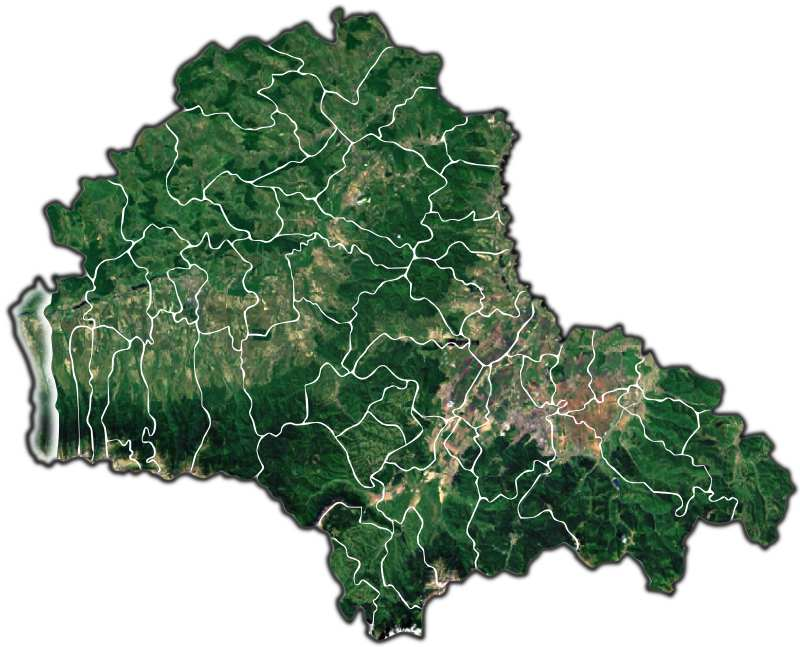
- Location in Brașov County

- Location in Romania
- Coordinates: 45°44′34″N 24°41′24″E
- Country: Romania
- County: Brașov

Government
  - Mayor (2024–2028): Camelia Bertea (PSD)
- Area: 6.47 km^{2} (2.50 sq mi)
- Elevation: 580 m (1,900 ft)
- Population (2021-12-01): 6,446
  - Density: 996/km^{2} (2,580/sq mi)
- Time zone: UTC+02:00 (EET)
  - Summer (DST): UTC+03:00 (EEST)
- Postal code: 505700
- Area code: (+40) 02 68
- Vehicle reg.: BV
- Website: primariavictoria.ro

Victoria (Romanian pronunciation: [vikˈtori.a]; German: Viktoriastadt; Hungarian: Viktóriaváros) is a town in the western part of Brașov County, Transylvania, Romania. It had a population of 6,446 at the 2021 census.

== Geography ==
The town is located in the western part of Brașov County, 94 km (58 mi) from the county seat, Brașov, on the border with Sibiu County. In lies in the historical region of Țara Făgărașului, halfway between the Olt River to the north and the Făgăraș Mountains to the south.

== History ==
In 1939, the Romanian state signed a contract with the German company Ferrostaal to build a factory (called "Ucea") on the site of what is now Victoria. The contract was canceled after Romania declared war on Germany in 1944, during World War II.

The building of the town began in 1949 and it had the provisional names of "Colonia Ucea" and "Ucea Roșie" (Red Ucea), only to be changed in November 1954 to Victoria.

== Climate ==
Victoria has a warm-summer humid continental climate (Dfb in the Köppen climate classification).

Climate data for Victoria
Month	Jan	Feb	Mar	Apr	May	Jun	Jul	Aug	Sep	Oct	Nov	Dec	Year
Mean daily maximum °C (°F)	−0.7 (30.7)	1.1 (34.0)	5.4 (41.7)	11.7 (53.1)	16.6 (61.9)	19.8 (67.6)	21.7 (71.1)	21.9 (71.4)	17.1 (62.8)	12.1 (53.8)	6.9 (44.4)	0.9 (33.6)	11.2 (52.2)
Daily mean °C (°F)	−4.6 (23.7)	−3 (27)	1.1 (34.0)	6.8 (44.2)	12 (54)	15.6 (60.1)	17.4 (63.3)	17.5 (63.5)	12.8 (55.0)	7.5 (45.5)	2.6 (36.7)	−2.8 (27.0)	6.9 (44.5)
Mean daily minimum °C (°F)	−8.5 (16.7)	−6.9 (19.6)	−3.2 (26.2)	1.6 (34.9)	7 (45)	11 (52)	12.8 (55.0)	12.9 (55.2)	8.6 (47.5)	3.5 (38.3)	−0.8 (30.6)	−6.3 (20.7)	2.6 (36.8)
Average precipitation mm (inches)	54 (2.1)	52 (2.0)	70 (2.8)	107 (4.2)	143 (5.6)	162 (6.4)	141 (5.6)	122 (4.8)	89 (3.5)	69 (2.7)	58 (2.3)	59 (2.3)	1,126 (44.3)
Source: https://en.climate-data.org/europe/romania/brasov/victoria-44870/

Historical population
Year	Pop.	±%
1956	2,762	—
1966	6,717	+143.2%
1977	8,209	+22.2%
1992	10,247	+24.8%
2002	9,059	−11.6%
2011	7,067	−22.0%
2021	6,446	−8.8%
Source: Census data

== Twin towns ==
- Chevilly-Larue, France (1994)
- Utrechtse Heuvelrug, Netherlands (2005)
- Lariano, Italy (2007)

== Natives ==
- Cosmin Băcilă (born 1983), footballer
- Iulian Popa (born 1984), footballer
