= List of countries by electricity production =

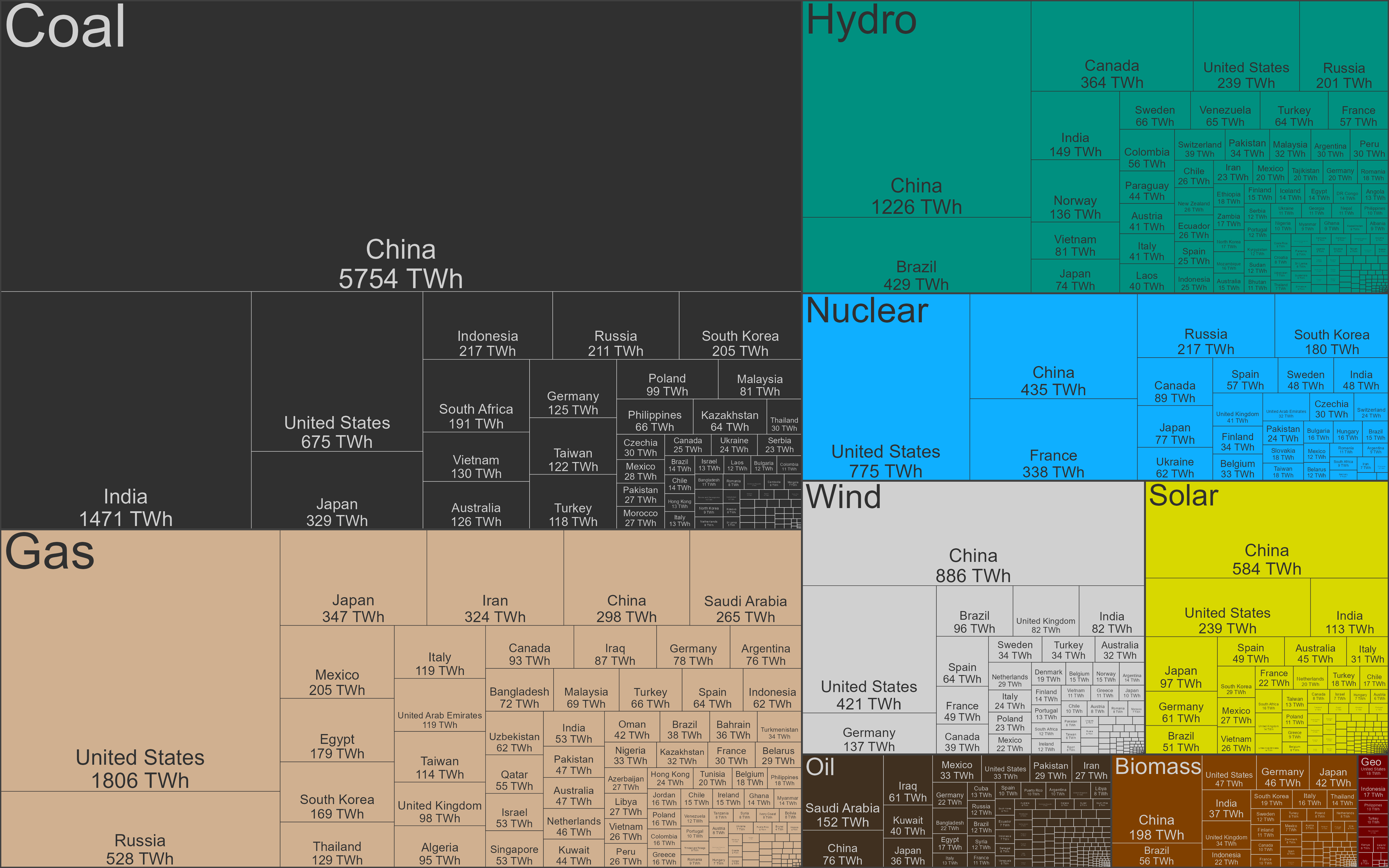
Electricity generation by source and country in 2023

This is a list of countries and dependencies by annual electricity production. China is the world's largest electricity producing country, followed by the United States and India.

Data are for the year 2025 and are sourced from Ember unless otherwise specified. Links for each location go to the relevant electricity market page, when available.

== Total production (TWh) ==
Data in this table are from Ember. It includes some dependent territories.

Location	Total (TWh)	Fossil fuels (TWh)			Nuclear (TWh)	Renewables (TWh)					Year
Location	Total (TWh)	Coal	Gas	Other	Nuclear (TWh)	Hydro	Wind	Solar	Bio.	Other	Year
World	31,746.92	10,491.47	6,903.64	823.92	2,813.09	4,433.08	2,711.33	2,778.23	702.83	89.33	2025
China	10,579.70	5,773.02	317.94	88.71	487.35	1,395.70	1,135.44	1,174.92	206.62		2025
United States	4,519.79	737.15	1,807.34	31.72	784.78	241.70	464.39	388.82	46.19	17.70	2025
India	2,081.60	1,474.15	48.54	4.10	53.83	177.97	103.98	195.99	23.04		2025
Russia	1,192.79	219.52	533.17	14.47	218.65	199.73	3.64	2.84	0.77		2025
Japan	1,029.86	330.08	337.57	25.39	94.09	73.90	12.85	101.06	54.92		2025
Brazil	750.53	17.19	54.85	12.65	15.87	388.63	117.58	88.64	55.12		2025
Canada	652.43	26.05	116.61	7.61	85.32	344.74	51.48	10.17	10.45		2025
South Korea	624.66	194.53	174.58	5.95	184.67	3.80	3.64	37.80	19.69		2025
France	570.17	1.74	17.25	10.36	392.07	59.41	46.49	32.01	10.27	0.57	2025
Germany	500.47	103.15	82.67	18.91		19.56	136.03	89.62	50.53		2025
Saudi Arabia	454.64		287.98	156.84			1.59	8.23			2024
Iran	395.78	0.73	354.39	18.10	7.35	13.03	1.25	0.90	0.03		2025
Indonesia	371.54	228.43	68.78	7.12		27.29	0.47	1.35	21.33	16.77	2024
Mexico	356.97	10.88	219.92	33.58	10.16	28.75	21.38	26.34	5.96		2025
Turkey	353.86	121.40	78.36	1.03		57.27	39.42	37.25	8.48	10.65	2025
Vietnam	309.99	149.24	19.34	0.62		102.35	14.37	23.04	1.03		2025
United Kingdom	292.31	0.33	90.91	12.77	36.38	5.55	85.84	19.32	41.21		2025
Taiwan	288.39	104.55	140.66	4.63	3.25	5.51	12.01	15.68	2.10		2025
Spain	287.89	0.92	62.06	10.03	54.07	32.74	58.76	62.90	6.41		2025
Australia	286.34	122.35	47.05	6.36		12.22	39.23	56.09	3.04		2025
Italy	264.70	3.73	125.05	6.81		41.70	21.48	44.63	15.61	5.69	2025
Egypt	245.71		195.65	18.08		15.07	9.30	7.61			2025
South Africa	242.76	197.50		1.95	10.21	1.83	11.32	19.48	0.47		2025
Malaysia	201.09	89.60	67.89	2.07		35.24		4.51	1.78		2025
Thailand	188.24	33.56	123.34	0.14		7.62	3.41	9.98	10.19		2025
United Arab Emirates	177.26		121.01		40.63		0.20	15.21	0.21		2024
Pakistan	177.14	28.82	38.73	1.28	25.43	41.24	4.46	36.63	0.55		2025
Poland	173.26	87.32	24.82	6.53		1.70	24.62	19.55	8.48	0.24	2025
Sweden	170.71		0.11	1.97	47.10	68.24	38.90	4.43	9.96		2025
Norway	160.81		0.90	0.71		144.77	13.56	0.53	0.24	0.10	2025
Argentina	153.13	1.34	82.15	5.92	10.76	26.25	18.62	5.14	2.95		2025
Iraq	149.73		79.30	68.00		2.00		0.43			2024
Netherlands	134.96	9.55	47.09	5.23	3.99	0.05	33.70	28.50	6.85		2025
Kazakhstan	123.69	67.12	36.37	1.82		10.51	5.83	2.04			2025
Philippines	123.12	72.23	21.25	0.94		12.70	1.46	3.00	1.45	10.09	2025
Ukraine	111.51	23.32	7.18	0.53	62.18	11.02	1.42	5.08	0.78		2022
Bangladesh	103.40	22.24	66.48	12.47		0.65		1.56			2025
Algeria	96.36		95.00	0.33		0.02	0.02	0.99			2024
Kuwait	92.49		57.35	33.07			1.86	0.21			2025
Colombia	90.36	5.53	12.43	2.80		62.50	0.15	4.60	2.35		2025
Chile	88.50	15.72	13.54	0.50		19.68	11.58	22.18	5.03	0.27	2025
Uzbekistan	86.70	5.70	62.70	1.50		6.30	4.00	6.50			2025
Finland	82.30	0.16	0.95	1.90	32.82	12.44	22.58	0.98	10.34	0.13	2025
Israel	82.10	2.80	65.40				0.46	13.28	0.16		2025
Venezuela	80.13		3.60	3.50		73.00	0.02	0.01			2024
Czech Republic	75.50	26.60	4.08	0.16	31.94	1.71	0.57	4.39	6.05		2025
Austria	73.22		8.74	3.27		37.93	8.31	10.31	4.66		2025
Belgium	72.89		15.70	4.70	24.11	0.44	13.72	10.45	3.77		2025
Switzerland	65.02		0.27	1.23	19.42	33.99	0.14	7.89	1.04	1.04	2025
Peru	60.44	0.01	21.83	0.13		33.88	2.11	1.83	0.65		2025
Singapore	60.15	0.57	54.81	1.47				1.64	1.66		2025
Greece	58.27	2.74	22.39	4.18		3.42	11.91	12.92	0.71		2025
Qatar	56.18		53.90					2.15	0.13		2025
Oman	52.84		48.54	1.90			0.10	2.30			2025
Laos	52.31	12.18				40.00		0.09	0.04		2024
Portugal	51.13		8.39	1.35		15.18	13.67	8.86	3.48	0.20	2025
Romania	49.81	7.56	8.44	0.18	10.20	12.09	5.97	4.88	0.49		2025
Belarus	45.79	0.02	25.27	1.90	16.97	0.69	0.35	0.13	0.46		2025
Paraguay	45.35					45.11			0.24		2025
Morocco	44.15	27.52	4.78	1.57		0.92	6.74	2.58	0.04		2025
New Zealand	43.34	0.49	3.84	0.64		23.77	4.22	0.37	0.57	9.44	2025
Nigeria	41.54		28.53			12.82		0.13	0.06		2025
Hungary	40.24	1.38	8.15	0.40	16.10	0.23	0.60	10.98	2.39	0.01	2025
Serbia	39.299	24.503	2.51	0.11		9.833	2.05	0.16	0.41		2025
Bulgaria	37.96	8.55	1.85	0.26	14.85	2.53	1.32	6.89	1.71		2025
Bahrain	37.95		37.85					0.10			2024
Hong Kong	37.44	12.60	24.00	0.45				0.23	0.16		2024
Ecuador	36.60		0.98	6.56		28.51	0.19	0.04	0.32		2025
Libya	34.59		25.78	8.80				0.01			2024
Ethiopia	33.37					32.19	1.10	0.04	0.01	0.03	2025
Denmark	33.30	0.89	0.81	1.24		0.02	19.21	4.45	6.68		2025
Turkmenistan	33.01		33.00			0.01					2024
Ireland	30.97	0.16	14.97	0.92		0.65	11.76	1.49	1.02		2025
Slovakia	29.10	0.31	3.28	0.73	19.33	3.16		0.70	1.58	0.01	2025
Azerbaijan	27.46		24.65	0.08		2.54	0.09		0.10		2025
North Korea	27.10	9.23		0.70		17.00		0.17			2024
Syria	24.88		13.00	11.00		0.75		0.10	0.03		2024
Ghana	24.27		14.91	0.57		8.60		0.17	0.02		2024
Tajikistan	24.01	1.15	0.26			22.60					2025
Jordan	23.67		14.67	3.30		0.02	1.75	3.93			2024
Dominican Republic	22.68	6.59	6.07	4.62		1.53	1.42	2.25	0.20		2025
Tunisia	22.31		21.18	0.23		0.01	0.33	0.56			2025
Myanmar	21.71	1.20	10.00	0.12		10.00		0.12	0.27		2024
Mozambique	19.79		3.13	0.15		16.30		0.08	0.13		2024
Zambia	19.72	2.13		0.34		17.00		0.17	0.08		2024
Puerto Rico	19.58	3.06	5.75	9.57		0.01	0.23	0.95	0.01		2025
Cuba	19.43		2.65	16.00		0.12	0.07	0.24	0.35		2024
Iceland	19.05					13.46	0.01	0.01		5.57	2024
Cambodia	17.76	10.05		0.45		5.31		1.89	0.06		2025
Sri Lanka	17.25	4.75		1.87		6.59	0.93	2.84	0.23	0.04	2025
DR Congo	15.92					13.40		2.51	0.01		2024
Guatemala	15.79	2.50		2.50		6.30	0.37	0.28	3.50	0.34	2024
Kyrgyzstan	15.70	1.95	0.28	0.10		13.37					2025
Angola	15.59		1.40	2.70		11.00		0.44	0.05		2024
Slovenia	14.84	2.18	0.95		5.83	4.04	0.01	1.54	0.29		2025
Sudan	14.77			3.00		11.50		0.16	0.11		2024
Croatia	14.70	0.73	2.76			5.77	3.15	1.29	1.00		2025
Bosnia and Herzegovina	14.44	8.00		0.15		5.29	0.37	0.59	0.04		2025
Kenya	14.04			1.40		2.94	2.30	0.65	0.30	6.45	2025
Bolivia	13.63		8.51	0.20		3.80	0.28	0.40	0.44		2025
Georgia	13.50		2.75			10.64	0.08	0.03			2025
Panama	13.43	0.50	2.80	1.00		7.13	0.96	0.99	0.05		2024
Costa Rica	12.81					9.58	1.55	0.09	0.06	1.53	2025
Honduras	12.48	0.06		5.50		3.80	0.75	1.18	0.84	0.35	2024
Uruguay	11.94			0.26		3.25	4.85	0.61	2.97		2025
Nepal	11.13					11.00	0.01	0.12			2024
Bhutan	11.00					11.00					2024
Ivory Coast	10.79		7.65	0.02		3.00		0.02	0.10		2024
Zimbabwe	10.26	4.40				5.70		0.04	0.12		2024
Mongolia	9.69	8.31		0.57		0.06	0.54	0.21			2025
Trinidad and Tobago	9.55		9.50	0.04				0.01			2024
Lithuania	8.89		1.47	0.52		0.35	3.99	1.67	0.89		2025
Tanzania	8.84		5.55	0.38		2.80		0.04	0.07		2024
Armenia	8.67		3.31		2.68	1.93		0.75			2025
Albania	8.34					8.00		0.34			2024
Senegal	7.63	0.10	0.02	6.00		0.31	0.41	0.68	0.11		2024
Cameroon	7.26		1.60	0.35		5.23		0.04	0.04		2024
North Macedonia	6.82	2.09	1.34	0.17		1.36	0.20	1.62	0.04		2025
El Salvador	6.46			0.87		1.96	0.20	1.31	0.78	1.34	2025
Latvia	6.27		1.64	0.05		2.93	0.22	0.82	0.61		2025
Moldova	6.16		5.25	0.22		0.35	0.16	0.16	0.02		2025
Estonia	6.11		0.08	2.39		0.03	1.15	1.13	1.33		2025
Mali	5.96			4.80		0.92		0.17	0.07		2024
Cyprus	5.91			4.27			0.21	1.37	0.06		2025
Uganda	5.81			0.17		5.00		0.17	0.47		2024
Brunei	5.56	1.10	4.40	0.05				0.01			2024
Congo	5.46		4.03	0.29		1.10		0.01	0.03		2024
Lebanon	5.34			3.00		0.70	0.01	1.60	0.03		2024
Kosovo	5.33	4.73		0.01		0.23	0.35	0.01			2025
Yemen	5.25		0.06	4.60				0.59			2024
Jamaica	4.92		2.80	1.50		0.12	0.29	0.15	0.06		2024
Papua New Guinea	4.73		0.91	2.70		1.00		0.01	0.01	0.10	2024
Nicaragua	4.52			1.70		0.65	0.56	0.03	0.89	0.69	2024
Guinea	4.03			1.00		3.00		0.03			2024
Botswana	3.43	3.37		0.05				0.01			2024
Mauritius	3.41	1.34		1.46		0.11	0.01	0.17	0.32		2024
New Caledonia	3.12	1.14		1.14		0.54	0.04	0.26			2024
Réunion	3.07	0.40		0.93		0.39	0.02	0.29	1.04		2023
Gabon	2.60		1.15	0.53		0.91			0.01		2024
Montenegro	2.46	0.60				1.44	0.28	0.14			2025
Madagascar	2.43	0.50		0.90		0.90		0.10	0.03		2024
Bahamas	2.25			2.23				0.02			2024
Malta	2.19		1.82	0.02				0.34	0.01		2025
Mauritania	2.07			1.60		0.21	0.10	0.16			2024
Guam	1.86			1.70				0.16			2024
Malawi	1.83			0.08		1.69		0.01	0.05		2024
Suriname	1.74		0.02	0.80		0.90		0.01	0.01		2024
Burkina Faso	1.69			1.40		0.09		0.11	0.09		2024
Guadeloupe	1.67	0.22		0.86		0.01	0.10	0.11	0.26	0.11	2023
Namibia	1.64	0.04				1.00	0.02	0.58			2024
Luxembourg	1.54		0.06	0.07		0.05	0.47	0.47	0.42		2025
Martinique	1.51			1.12			0.03	0.11	0.24	0.01	2023
Equatorial Guinea	1.49		1.08	0.01		0.40					2024
Guyana	1.38		0.01	1.33				0.02	0.02		2024
Fiji	1.15			0.42		0.60		0.01	0.12		2024
Rwanda	1.13	0.17	0.30	0.10		0.52		0.04			2024
Barbados	1.11		0.03	0.98				0.10			2024
Benin	1.01		0.73	0.24				0.04			2024
Aruba	1.00			0.83			0.14	0.03			2024
Afghanistan	0.99	0.03		0.10		0.75		0.11			2024
Palestine	0.99			0.60				0.39			2024
French Guiana	0.98			0.34		0.52		0.06	0.06		2023
Niger	0.95	0.17	0.05	0.70				0.03			2024
Haiti	0.86			0.70		0.16					2024
Maldives	0.85			0.79				0.06			2024
Macau	0.78		0.49	0.05					0.24		2024
French Polynesia	0.72			0.47		0.19		0.06			2024
Cayman Islands	0.71			0.68				0.03			2024
Togo	0.71		0.50			0.08		0.13			2024
U.S. Virgin Islands	0.68			0.66				0.02			2023
Seychelles	0.63			0.53			0.01	0.09			2024
Bermuda	0.61			0.60					0.01		2024
Eswatini	0.61	0.02				0.35		0.03	0.21		2024
Greenland	0.60			0.10		0.47			0.03		2024
Liberia	0.57			0.26		0.30		0.01			2024
South Sudan	0.56			0.55				0.01			2024
Cape Verde	0.52			0.36			0.08	0.08			2024
Gambia	0.51			0.51							2024
Timor-Leste	0.51			0.51							2024
Burundi	0.49			0.12		0.36			0.01		2024
Faroe Islands	0.49			0.26		0.13	0.09		0.01		2023
Belize	0.47			0.06		0.24		0.01	0.16		2024
Eritrea	0.45			0.40				0.05			2024
Somalia	0.43			0.34			0.01	0.08			2024
Saint Lucia	0.40			0.39				0.01			2024
Antigua and Barbuda	0.37			0.34				0.03			2024
Chad	0.37			0.35			0.01		0.01		2024
Turks and Caicos Islands	0.27			0.26				0.01			2024
Grenada	0.24			0.24							2024
Saint Kitts and Nevis	0.23			0.21			0.01	0.01			2024
Gibraltar	0.22		0.18	0.04							2024
Sierra Leone	0.21			0.01		0.18		0.02			2024
Djibouti	0.20			0.13			0.07				2024
American Samoa	0.18			0.17				0.01			2024
British Virgin Islands	0.17			0.17							2023
Samoa	0.16			0.09		0.03		0.03	0.01		2024
Dominica	0.15			0.13		0.02					2023
Saint Vincent and the Grenadines	0.15			0.13		0.02					2024
Central African Republic	0.14					0.14					2023
Comoros	0.14			0.14							2023
Solomon Islands	0.11			0.10				0.01			2024
São Tomé and Príncipe	0.09			0.08		0.01					2023
Western Sahara	0.09			0.09							2009
Guinea-Bissau	0.08			0.08							2024
Vanuatu	0.08			0.06		0.01		0.01			2023
Tonga	0.07			0.06				0.01			2024
Nauru	0.05			0.04				0.01			2024
Saint Pierre and Miquelon	0.05			0.05							2023
Cook Islands	0.04			0.02				0.02			2024
Kiribati	0.04			0.03				0.01			2024
Falkland Islands	0.01			0.01							2023
Montserrat	0.01			0.01							2024
Saint Helena, Ascension and Tristan da Cunha	0.01			0.01							2023
Lesotho	0.00										2024
Niue	0.00										2023

== Total production (percent) ==
Location	% of world	Percent of country									Year
Location	% of world	Coal	Gas	Other f.	Nuclear	Hydro	Wind	Solar	Bio.	Other r.	Year
World	100	33.1	21.8	2.6	8.9	14.0	8.5	8.8	2.2	0.3	2025
China	33.36	54.6	3.0	0.8	4.6	13.2	10.7	11.1	2.0		2025
United States	14.25	16.3	40.0	0.7	17.4	5.3	10.3	8.6	1.0	0.4	2025
India	6.56	70.8	2.3	0.2	2.6	8.5	5.0	9.4	1.1		2025
Russia	3.76	18.4	44.7	1.2	18.3	16.7	0.3	0.2	0.1		2025
Japan	3.25	32.1	32.8	2.5	9.1	7.2	1.2	9.8	5.3		2025
Brazil	2.37	2.3	7.3	1.7	2.1	51.8	15.7	11.8	7.3		2025
Canada	2.06	4.0	17.9	1.2	13.1	52.8	7.9	1.6	1.6		2025
South Korea	1.97	31.1	27.9	1.0	29.6	0.6	0.6	6.1	3.2		2025
France	1.80	0.3	3.0	1.8	68.8	10.4	8.2	5.6	1.8	0.1	2025
Germany	1.58	20.6	16.5	3.8		3.9	27.2	17.9	10.1		2025
Saudi Arabia	1.43		63.3	34.5			0.3	1.8			2024
Iran	1.25	0.2	89.5	4.6	1.9	3.3	0.3	0.2	0.0		2025
Indonesia	1.17	61.5	18.5	1.9		7.3	0.1	0.4	5.7	4.5	2024
Mexico	1.13	3.0	61.6	9.4	2.8	8.1	6.0	7.4	1.7		2025
Turkey	1.12	34.3	22.1	0.3		16.2	11.1	10.5	2.4	3.0	2025
Vietnam	0.98	48.1	6.2	0.2		33.0	4.6	7.4	0.3		2025
United Kingdom	0.92	0.1	31.1	4.4	12.4	1.9	29.4	6.6	14.1		2025
Taiwan	0.91	36.3	48.8	1.6	1.1	1.9	4.2	5.4	0.7		2025
Spain	0.91	0.3	21.6	3.5	18.8	11.4	20.4	21.8	2.2		2025
Australia	0.90	42.7	16.4	2.2		4.3	13.7	19.6	1.1		2025
Italy	0.83	1.4	47.2	2.6		15.8	8.1	16.9	5.9	2.1	2025
Egypt	0.77		79.6	7.4		6.1	3.8	3.1			2025
South Africa	0.77	81.4		0.8	4.2	0.8	4.7	8.0	0.2		2025
Malaysia	0.63	44.6	33.8	1.0		17.5		2.2	0.9		2025
Thailand	0.59	17.8	65.5	0.1		4.0	1.8	5.3	5.4		2025
United Arab Emirates	0.56		68.3		22.9		0.1	8.6	0.1		2024
Pakistan	0.56	16.3	21.9	0.7	14.4	23.3	2.5	20.7	0.3		2025
Poland	0.55	50.4	14.3	3.8		1.0	14.2	11.3	4.9	0.1	2025
Sweden	0.54		0.1	1.2	27.6	40.0	22.8	2.6	5.8		2025
Norway	0.51		0.6	0.4		90.0	8.4	0.3	0.1	0.1	2025
Argentina	0.48	0.9	53.6	3.9	7.0	17.1	12.2	3.4	1.9		2025
Iraq	0.47		53.0	45.4		1.3		0.3			2024
Netherlands	0.43	7.1	34.9	3.9	3.0	0.0	25.0	21.1	5.1		2025
Kazakhstan	0.39	54.3	29.4	1.5		8.5	4.7	1.6			2025
Philippines	0.39	58.7	17.3	0.8		10.3	1.2	2.4	1.2	8.2	2025
Ukraine	0.35	20.9	6.4	0.5	55.8	9.9	1.3	4.6	0.7		2022
Bangladesh	0.33	21.5	64.3	12.1		0.6		1.5			2025
Algeria	0.30		98.6	0.3		0.0	0.0	1.0			2024
Kuwait	0.29		62.0	35.8			2.0	0.2			2025
Colombia	0.28	6.1	13.8	3.1		69.2	0.2	5.1	2.6		2025
Chile	0.28	17.8	15.3	0.6		22.2	13.1	25.1	5.7	0.3	2025
Uzbekistan	0.27	6.6	72.3	1.7		7.3	4.6	7.5			2025
Finland	0.26	0.2	1.2	2.3	39.9	15.1	27.4	1.2	12.6	0.2	2025
Israel	0.26	3.4	79.7				0.6	16.2	0.2		2025
Venezuela	0.25		4.5	4.4		91.1	0.0	0.0			2024
Czech Republic	0.24	35.2	5.4	0.2	42.3	2.3	0.8	5.8	8.0		2025
Austria	0.23		11.9	4.5		51.8	11.3	14.1	6.4		2025
Belgium	0.23		21.5	6.4	33.1	0.6	18.8	14.3	5.2		2025
Switzerland	0.21		0.4	1.9	29.9	52.3	0.2	12.1	1.6	1.6	2025
Peru	0.19	0.0	36.1	0.2		56.1	3.5	3.0	1.1		2025
Singapore	0.19	0.9	91.1	2.4				2.7	2.8		2025
Greece	0.18	4.7	38.4	7.2		5.9	20.4	22.2	1.2		2025
Qatar	0.18		95.9					3.8	0.2		2025
Oman	0.17		91.9	3.6			0.2	4.4			2025
Laos	0.16	23.3				76.5		0.2	0.1		2024
Portugal	0.16		16.4	2.6		29.7	26.7	17.3	6.8	0.4	2025
Romania	0.16	15.2	16.9	0.4	20.5	24.3	12.0	9.8	1.0		2025
Belarus	0.14	0.0	55.2	4.1	37.1	1.5	0.8	0.3	1.0		2025
Paraguay	0.14					99.5			0.5		2025
Morocco	0.14	62.3	10.8	3.6		2.1	15.3	5.8	0.1		2025
New Zealand	0.14	1.1	8.9	1.5		54.8	9.7	0.9	1.3	21.8	2025
Nigeria	0.13		68.7			30.9		0.3	0.1		2025
Hungary	0.13	3.4	20.3	1.0	40.0	0.6	1.5	27.3	5.9	0.0	2025
Bulgaria	0.12	22.5	4.9	0.7	39.1	6.7	3.5	18.2	4.5		2025
Bahrain	0.12		99.7					0.3			2024
Hong Kong	0.12	33.7	64.1	1.2				0.6	0.4		2024
Serbia	0.12	65.0	6.9	0.3		22.2	4.0	0.4	1.1		2025
Ecuador	0.12		2.7	17.9		77.9	0.5	0.1	0.9		2025
Libya	0.11		74.5	25.4				0.0			2024
Ethiopia	0.11					96.5	3.3	0.1	0.0	0.1	2025
Denmark	0.11	2.7	2.4	3.7		0.1	57.7	13.4	20.1		2025
Turkmenistan	0.10		100.0			0.0					2024
Ireland	0.098	0.5	48.3	3.0		2.1	38.0	4.8	3.3		2025
Slovakia	0.092	1.1	11.3	2.5	66.4	10.9		2.4	5.4	0.0	2025
Azerbaijan	0.087		89.8	0.3		9.2	0.3		0.4		2025
North Korea	0.085	34.1		2.6		62.7		0.6			2024
Syria	0.078		52.3	44.2		3.0		0.4	0.1		2024
Ghana	0.077		61.4	2.3		35.4		0.7	0.1		2024
Tajikistan	0.076	4.8	1.1			94.1					2025
Jordan	0.075		62.0	13.9		0.1	7.4	16.6			2024
Dominican Republic	0.072	29.1	26.8	20.4		6.7	6.3	9.9	0.9		2025
Tunisia	0.070		94.9	1.0		0.0	1.5	2.5			2025
Myanmar	0.068	5.5	46.1	0.6		46.1		0.6	1.2		2024
Mozambique	0.062		15.8	0.8		82.4		0.4	0.7		2024
Zambia	0.062	10.8		1.7		86.2		0.9	0.4		2024
Puerto Rico	0.062	15.6	29.4	48.9		0.1	1.2	4.9	0.1		2025
Cuba	0.061		13.6	82.3		0.6	0.4	1.2	1.8		2024
Iceland	0.060					70.7	0.1	0.1		29.2	2024
Cambodia	0.056	56.6		2.5		29.9		10.6	0.3		2025
Sri Lanka	0.054	27.5		10.8		38.2	5.4	16.5	1.3	0.2	2025
DR Congo	0.050					84.2		15.8	0.1		2024
Guatemala	0.050	15.8		15.8		39.9	2.3	1.8	22.2	2.2	2024
Kyrgyzstan	0.050	12.4	1.8	0.6		85.2					2025
Angola	0.049		9.0	17.3		70.6		2.8	0.3		2024
Slovenia	0.047	14.7	6.4		39.3	27.2	0.1	10.4	2.0		2025
Sudan	0.047			20.3		77.9		1.1	0.7		2024
Croatia	0.046	5.0	18.8			39.3	21.4	8.8	6.8		2025
Bosnia and Herzegovina	0.046	55.4		1.0		36.6	2.6	4.1	0.3		2025
Kenya	0.044			10.0		20.9	16.4	4.6	2.1	45.9	2025
Bolivia	0.043		62.4	1.5		27.9	2.1	2.9	3.2		2025
Georgia	0.043		20.4			78.8	0.6	0.2			2025
Panama	0.042	3.7	20.8	7.4		53.1	7.1	7.4	0.4		2024
Costa Rica	0.040					74.8	12.1	0.7	0.5	11.9	2025
Honduras	0.039	0.5		44.1		30.4	6.0	9.5	6.7	2.8	2024
Uruguay	0.038			2.2		27.2	40.6	5.1	24.9		2025
Nepal	0.035					98.8	0.1	1.1			2024
Bhutan	0.035					100.0					2024
Ivory Coast	0.034		70.9	0.2		27.8		0.2	0.9		2024
Zimbabwe	0.032	42.9				55.6		0.4	1.2		2024
Mongolia	0.031	85.8		5.9		0.6	5.6	2.2			2025
Trinidad and Tobago	0.030		99.5	0.4				0.1			2024
Lithuania	0.028		16.5	5.8		3.9	44.9	18.8	10.0		2025
Tanzania	0.028		62.8	4.3		31.7		0.5	0.8		2024
Armenia	0.027		38.2		30.9	22.3		8.7			2025
Albania	0.026					95.9		4.1			2024
Senegal	0.024	1.3	0.3	78.6		4.1	5.4	8.9	1.4		2024
Cameroon	0.023		22.0	4.8		72.0		0.6	0.6		2024
North Macedonia	0.022	30.6	19.6	2.5		19.9	2.9	23.8	0.6		2025
El Salvador	0.020			13.5		30.3	3.1	20.3	12.1	20.7	2025
Latvia	0.020		26.2	0.8		46.7	3.5	13.1	9.7		2025
Moldova	0.019		85.2	3.6		5.7	2.6	2.6	0.3		2025
Estonia	0.019		1.3	39.1		0.5	18.8	18.5	21.8		2025
Mali	0.019			80.5		15.4		2.9	1.2		2024
Cyprus	0.019			72.3			3.6	23.2	1.0		2025
Uganda	0.018			2.9		86.1		2.9	8.1		2024
Brunei	0.018	19.8	79.1	0.9				0.2			2024
Congo	0.017		73.8	5.3		20.1		0.2	0.5		2024
Lebanon	0.017			56.2		13.1	0.2	30.0	0.6		2024
Kosovo	0.017	88.7		0.2		4.3	6.6	0.2			2025
Yemen	0.017		1.1	87.6				11.2			2024
Jamaica	0.016		56.9	30.5		2.4	5.9	3.0	1.2		2024
Papua New Guinea	0.015		19.2	57.1		21.1		0.2	0.2	2.1	2024
Nicaragua	0.014			37.6		14.4	12.4	0.7	19.7	15.3	2024
Guinea	0.013			24.8		74.4		0.7			2024
Botswana	0.011	98.3		1.5				0.3			2024
Mauritius	0.011	39.3		42.8		3.2	0.3	5.0	9.4		2024
New Caledonia	0.010	36.5		36.5		17.3	1.3	8.3			2024
Réunion	0.010	13.0		30.3		12.7	0.7	9.4	33.9		2023
Gabon	0.008		44.2	20.4		35.0			0.4		2024
Montenegro	0.008	24.4				58.5	11.4	5.7			2025
Madagascar	0.008	20.6		37.0		37.0		4.1	1.2		2024
Bahamas	0.007			99.1				0.9			2024
Malta	0.007		83.1	0.9				15.5	0.5		2025
Mauritania	0.007			77.3		10.1	4.8	7.7			2024
Guam	0.006			91.4				8.6			2024
Malawi	0.006			4.4		92.3		0.5	2.7		2024
Suriname	0.005		1.1	46.0		51.7		0.6	0.6		2024
Burkina Faso	0.005			82.8		5.3		6.5	5.3		2024
Guadeloupe	0.005	13.2		51.5		0.6	6.0	6.6	15.6	6.6	2023
Namibia	0.005	2.4				61.0	1.2	35.4			2024
Luxembourg	0.005		3.9	4.5		3.2	30.5	30.5	27.3		2025
Martinique	0.005			74.2			2.0	7.3	15.9	0.7	2023
Equatorial Guinea	0.005		72.5	0.7		26.8					2024
Guyana	0.004		0.7	96.4				1.4	1.4		2024
Fiji	0.004			36.5		52.2		0.9	10.4		2024
Rwanda	0.004	15.0	26.5	8.8		46.0		3.5			2024
Barbados	0.004		2.7	88.3				9.0			2024
Benin	0.003		72.3	23.8				4.0			2024
Aruba	0.003			83.0			14.0	3.0			2024
Afghanistan	0.003	3.0		10.1		75.8		11.1			2024
Palestine	0.003			60.6				39.4			2024
French Guiana	0.003			34.7		53.1		6.1	6.1		2023
Niger	0.003	17.9	5.3	73.7				3.2			2024
Haiti	0.003			81.4		18.6					2024
Maldives	0.003			92.9				7.1			2024
Macau	0.002		62.8	6.4					30.8		2024
French Polynesia	0.002			65.3		26.4		8.3			2024
Cayman Islands	0.002			95.8				4.2			2024
Togo	0.002		70.4			11.3		18.3			2024
U.S. Virgin Islands	0.002			97.1				2.9			2023
Seychelles	0.002			84.1			1.6	14.3			2024
Bermuda	0.002			98.4					1.6		2024
Eswatini	0.002	3.3				57.4		4.9	34.4		2024
Greenland	0.002			16.7		78.3			5.0		2024
Liberia	0.002			45.6		52.6		1.8			2024
South Sudan	0.002			98.2				1.8			2024
Cape Verde	0.002			69.2			15.4	15.4			2024
Gambia	0.002			100.0							2024
Timor-Leste	0.002			100.0							2024
Burundi	0.002			24.5		73.5			2.0		2024
Faroe Islands	0.002			53.1		26.5	18.4		2.0		2023
Belize	0.001			12.8		51.1		2.1	34.0		2024
Eritrea	0.001			88.9				11.1			2024
Somalia	0.001			79.1			2.3	18.6			2024
Saint Lucia	0.001			97.5				2.5			2024
Antigua and Barbuda	0.001			91.9				8.1			2024
Chad	0.001			94.6			2.7		2.7		2024
Turks and Caicos Islands	0.001			96.3				3.7			2024
Grenada	0.001			100.0							2024
Saint Kitts and Nevis	0.001			91.3			4.3	4.3			2024
Gibraltar	0.001		81.8	18.2							2024
Sierra Leone	0.001			4.8		85.7		9.5			2024
Djibouti	0.001			65.0			35.0				2024
American Samoa	0.001			94.4				5.6			2024
British Virgin Islands	0.001			100.0							2023
Samoa	0.001			56.3		18.8		18.8	6.3		2024
Dominica	0.001			86.7		13.3					2023
Saint Vincent and the Grenadines	0.001			86.7		13.3					2024
Central African Republic	0.000					100.0					2023
Comoros	0.000			100.0							2023
Solomon Islands	0.000			90.9				9.1			2024
São Tomé and Príncipe	0.000			88.9		11.1					2023
Western Sahara	0.000			100.0							2009
Guinea-Bissau	0.000			100.0							2024
Vanuatu	0.000			75.0		12.5		12.5			2023
Tonga	0.000			85.7				14.3			2024
Nauru	0.000			80.0				20.0			2024
Saint Pierre and Miquelon	0.000			100.0							2023
Cook Islands	0.000			50.0				50.0			2024
Kiribati	0.000			75.0				25.0			2024
Falkland Islands	0.000			100.0							2023
Montserrat	0.000			100.0							2024
Saint Helena, Ascension and Tristan da Cunha	0.000			100.0							2023
Lesotho	0.000					100.0					2022
Niue	0.000										2023

== See also ==
- Electricity by country
- List of countries by renewable electricity production
- List of countries by electricity consumption
- List of countries by energy consumption per capita
- List of countries by energy intensity
- List of countries by energy consumption and production
