= Electricity by country =

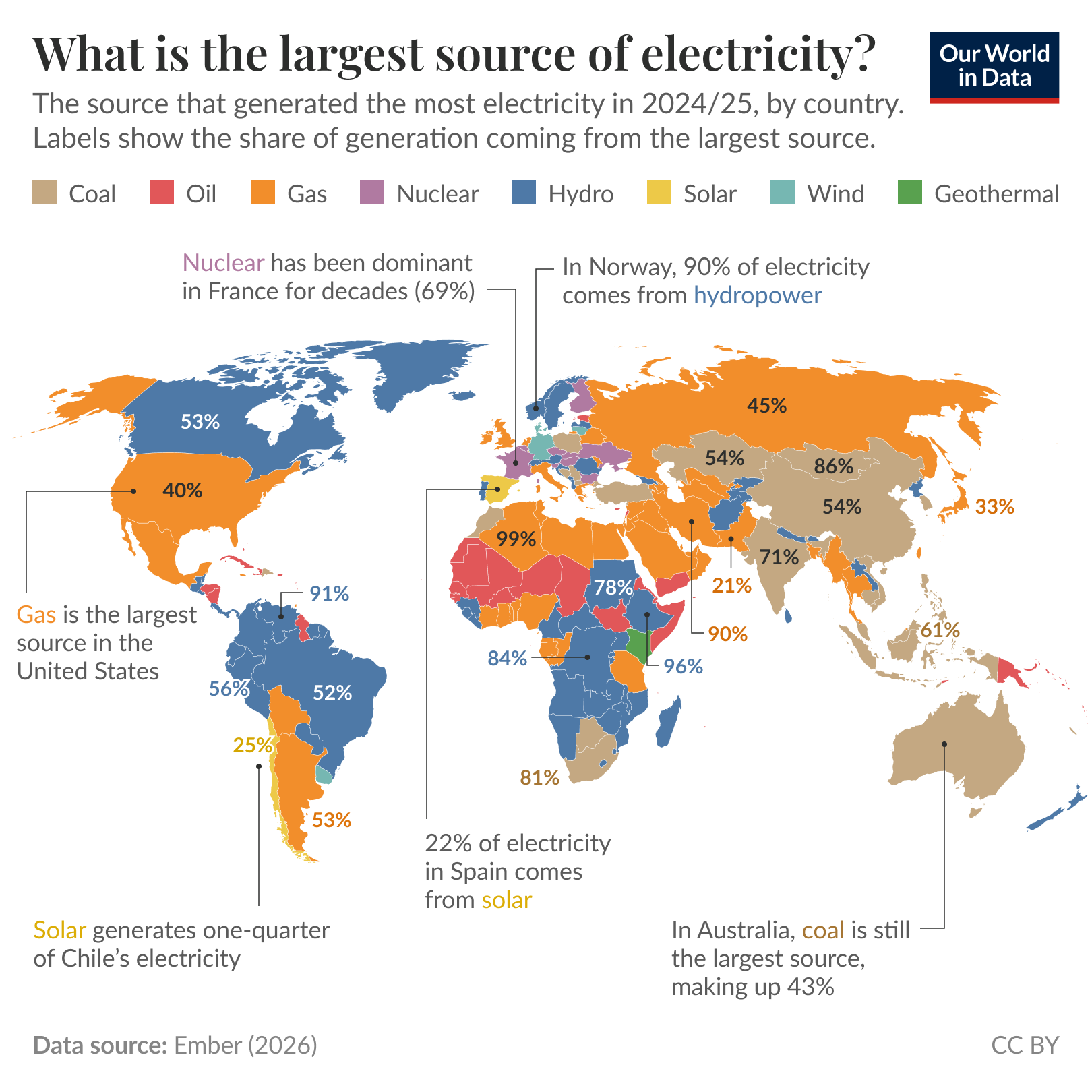
Map of the largest source of electricity by country

This is a list of electric generation, consumption, exports and imports by country. Data are for the year 2021 and are from the EIA. Figures are in terawatt-hours (TWh). Links for each location go to the relevant electricity market page, when available.

== List ==
Location	Gen.	Con.	Imports	Exports	Net imports
World	27,295	25,343	779	760	19
China	8,152	7,806	5	22	-18
United States	4,165	3,979	53	14	39
India	1,702	1,443	7	9	-2
Russia	1,110	996	4	22	-18
Japan	955	913	0	0	0
Brazil	663	577	23	0.04	23
Canada	626	555	10	48	-38
South Korea	587	568	0	0	0
Germany	557	512	51	70	-19
France	530	447	25	69	-45
Saudi Arabia	367	329	0	0.3	0
Iran	341	302	3	6	-4
Mexico	337	301	8	6	2
Turkey	317	284	2	4	-2
Indonesia	307	282	1	0	1
United Kingdom	289	287	29	4	25
Taiwan	287	278	0	0	0
Italy	274	300	47	4	43
Spain	259	234	17	17	0.9
Australia	247	237	0	0	0
Vietnam	244	229	3	2	2
South Africa	221	191	10	15	-4
Egypt	202	168	0.1	0.9	-1
Thailand	187	203	31	3	29
Poland	167	158	15	14	0.9
Sweden	165	131	8	34	-26
Malaysia	165	151	0.04	2	-2
Norway	158	131	8	26	-18
Pakistan	150	132	0.5	0	0.5
Ukraine	150	134	3	3	-1
Argentina	147	127	6	4	2
United Arab Emirates	136	129	0.2	0.2	0
Netherlands	117	113	21	21	0.3
Philippines	108	98	0	0	0
Kazakhstan	104	97	2	2	-1
Iraq	97	53	19	0	19
Belgium	95	83	15	23	-8
Venezuela	95	71	0	0.7	-1
Chile	85	81	0	0	0
Colombia	81	76	0.5	0	0.5
Bangladesh	81	78	7	0	7
Algeria	78	69	0.5	0.6	0
Czech Republic	77	62	15	26	-11
Israel	73	63	0	7	-7
Kuwait	71	65	0	0	0
Finland	70	84	24	7	17
Austria	64	69	26	19	8
Switzerland	60	58	32	29	3
Uzbekistan	59	58	5	3	3
Peru	58	52	0.04	0	0.04
Romania	55	51	9	6	2
Singapore	53	53	0	0	0
Greece	52	52	8	4	4
Qatar	48	45	0	0	0
Portugal	47	48	10	5	5
Belarus	44	41	4	5	0
New Zealand	43	41	0	0	0
Bulgaria	42	30	2	11	-9
Morocco	41	35	2	0.9	1
Paraguay	40	8	0	28	-28
Laos	40	6	1	33	-31
Oman	37	33	0	0	0
Hong Kong	35	46	13	0	13
Serbia	35	31	7	6	0.7
Hungary	34	44	20	7	13
Ireland	34	33	2	0.9	1
Denmark	33	38	19	13	6
Ecuador	32	27	0.3	1	-1
Libya	32	27	1	0	1
Bahrain	32	31	0.7	0.4	0.2
Nigeria	31	27	0	0	0
Slovakia	27	26	14	13	0.8
Azerbaijan	26	25	0.2	2	-2
Burma	22	17	0	1	-1
Jordan	22	20	0.3	0.2	0.1
Turkmenistan	21	15	0	3	-3
Ghana	21	18	0.06	1	-1
Tunisia	21	16	0.4	1	-1
Lebanon	21	19	0.09	0	0.09
Mozambique	20	13	8	12	-4
Cuba	20	16	0	0	0
Tajikistan	20	16	0.4	2	-1
Iceland	19	19	0	0	0
Puerto Rico	18	17	0	0	0
Zambia	18	14	0.1	1	-1
Dominican Republic	18	15	0	0	0
Bosnia and Herzegovina	17	11	3	8	-5
Syria	17	13	0	0.3	0
Sudan	17	13	0	0	0
Angola	16	15	0	0	0
Sri Lanka	16	15	0	0	0
Uruguay	16	14	0.5	2	-1
Slovenia	15	14	8	9	0
Ethiopia	15	10	0	2	-2
Croatia	15	16	11	8	3
Kyrgyzstan	14	12	0.4	0.3	0.05
North Korea	14	12	0	0	0
Guatemala	14	13	1	1	0
Costa Rica	13	11	0.01	1	-1
Georgia	13	13	3	2	2
Honduras	12	8	0.3	0.5	0
Kenya	12	9	0.2	0.02	0.1
Panama	11	9	0.06	0.6	-1
DR Congo	11	9	0.4	0.2	0.2
Ivory Coast	11	8	0.06	1	-1
Bolivia	11	10	0	0	0
Bhutan	9	3	0.1	5	-5
Albania	9	7	2	3	-1
Trinidad and Tobago	9	8	0	0	0
Cambodia	9	11	4	0	4
Tanzania	8	7	0.1	0	0.1
Cameroon	8	6	0.02	0	0.02
Zimbabwe	8	8	2	0.4	2
Armenia	7	6	0.4	1	-1
Mongolia	7	8	2	0.04	2
Moldova	7	10	3	0	3
Estonia	7	9	7	5	3
El Salvador	7	6	0.8	0.1	0.7
Kosovo	6	6	1	1	0.2
Nepal	6	7	3	0.1	3
Senegal	6	5	0.4	0	0.4
Latvia	6	7	5	3	2
North Macedonia	5	7	3	0.4	2
Cyprus	5	5	0	0	0
Papua New Guinea	5	5	0	0	0
Brunei	5	4	0	0	0
Nicaragua	5	5	1	0	1
Uganda	4	3	0.02	0.2	0
Jamaica	4	3	0	0	0
Congo	4	2	0.02	0.02	0.002
Lithuania	4	12	12	3	9
Yemen	4	3	0	0	0
Mali	3	3	0.2	0.6	0
New Caledonia	3	3	0	0	0
Montenegro	3	3	6	6	0.08
Mauritius	3	3	0	0	0
Guinea	3	2	0	0	0
Gabon	2	2	0.5	0	0.5
Botswana	2	3	2	0	2
Bahamas	2	2	0	0	0
Malta	2	2	0.5	0.04	0.5
Madagascar	2	2	0	0	0
Suriname	2	2	0.8	0	0.8
Mauritania	2	2	0.2	0	0.2
Guam	2	2	0	0	0
Burkina Faso	2	3	1	0	1
Namibia	2	3	3	0.6	2
Malawi	1	1	0	0	0
Equatorial Guinea	1	1	0	0	0
Guyana	1	1	0	0	0
Fiji	1	1	0	0	0
Barbados	1	1	0	0	0
Haiti	1	0.4	0	0	0
Aruba	0.9	1	0	0	0
Luxembourg	0.9	6	7	1	6
Liberia	0.9	1	0	0	0
Caribbean Netherlands	0.9	1	0	0	0
Palestine	0.9	6	6	0	6
Rwanda	0.9	1	0.04	0.01	0.03
Afghanistan	0.8	6	5	0	5
Eswatini	0.7	1	0.9	0	0.9
Cayman Islands	0.7	1	0	0	0
U.S. Virgin Islands	0.7	1	0	0	0
French Polynesia	0.7	1	0	0	0
Maldives	0.7	1	0	0	0
Belize	0.6	1	0.4	0	0.4
Seychelles	0.6	1	0	0	0
Togo	0.6	1	0.8	0	0.8
Greenland	0.6	1	0	0	0
Macau	0.6	6	5	0	5
Bermuda	0.6	1	0	0	0
South Sudan	0.6	1	0	0	0
Timor-Leste	0.5	0.4	0	0	0
Lesotho	0.5	1	0.5	0	0.5
Cape Verde	0.5	0.3	0	0	0
Eritrea	0.5	0.4	0	0	0
Niger	0.5	1	1	0	1
Faroe Islands	0.4	0.4	0	0	0
Somalia	0.4	0.4	0	0	0
Burundi	0.4	0.4	0.1	0	0.1
Saint Lucia	0.4	0.3	0	0	0
Antigua and Barbuda	0.4	0.3	0	0	0
Chad	0.3	0.3	0	0	0
Gambia	0.3	0.2	0	0	0
Turks and Caicos Islands	0.3	0.3	0	0	0
Benin	0.2	1	0.6	0.002	0.6
Grenada	0.2	0.2	0	0	0
Saint Kitts and Nevis	0.2	0.2	0	0	0
Gibraltar	0.2	0.2	0	0	0
Sierra Leone	0.2	0.1	0	0	0
Samoa	0.2	0.2	0	0	0
Dominica	0.2	0.2	0	0	0
American Samoa	0.2	0.2	0	0	0
Saint Vincent and the Grenadines	0.2	0.2	0	0	0
Central African Republic	0.2	0.1	0	0	0
British Virgin Islands	0.1	0.1	0	0	0
Comoros	0.1	0.1	0	0	0
Solomon Islands	0.1	0.1	0	0	0
São Tomé and Príncipe	0.1	0.09	0	0	0
Guinea-Bissau	0.08	0.08	0	0	0
Tonga	0.08	0.07	0	0	0
Vanuatu	0.07	0.07	0	0	0
Djibouti	0.06	0.5	0.5	0	0.5
Saint Pierre and Miquelon	0.05	0.05	0	0	0
Cook Islands	0.04	0.04	0	0	0
Nauru	0.04	0.04	0	0	0
Kiribati	0.03	0.03	0	0	0
Falkland Islands	0.02	0.02	0	0	0
Montserrat	0.01	0.01	0	0	0
Saint Helena	0.01	0.01	0	0	0
Niue	0.004	0.003	0	0	0

== See also ==
- List of countries by electricity production
- List of countries by electricity consumption
- Mains electricity by country
- Electricity generation
- Electric energy consumption
