= Electricity sectors by country =

This is a list of national electric power industries, organised by regions of the world.

== Africa ==
- Electricity sector in DR Congo
- Electricity sector in Ethiopia
- Electricity sector in Ghana
- Electricity sector in Kenya
- Electricity sector in Nigeria
- Electricity sector in South Africa

== Asia ==
- Electricity sector in Bangladesh
- Electricity sector in Brunei
- Electricity sector in China
  - Electricity sector in Hong Kong
  - Electricity sector in Macau
- Electricity sector in India
- Electricity sector in Japan
- Electricity sector in Mongolia
- Electricity sector in North Korea
- Electricity sector in Pakistan
- Electricity sector in the Philippines
- Electricity sector in Singapore
- Electricity sector in South Korea
- Electricity sector in Sri Lanka
- Electricity sector in Taiwan
- Electricity sector in Turkey

== Middle East ==
- Electricity sector in Egypt
- Electricity sector in Iran
- Electricity sector in Iraq
- Electricity sector in Saudi Arabia

== Europe ==
- Electricity sector in Armenia
- Electricity sector in Azerbaijan
- Electricity sector in Belgium
- Electricity sector in Bulgaria
- Electricity sector in Croatia
- Electricity sector in the Czech Republic
- Electricity sector in Denmark
- Electricity sector in Estonia
- Electricity sector in Finland
- Electricity sector in France
- Electricity sector in Germany
- Electricity in Great Britain
  - Green electricity in the United Kingdom
- Electricity sector in Iceland
- Electricity sector in Ireland
- Electricity sector in Italy
- Electricity sector in Kazakhstan
- Electrical energy in Kosovo
- Electricity sector in Latvia
- Electricity sector in Liechtenstein
- Electricity sector in Lithuania
- Electricity sector in Luxembourg
- Electricity sector in the Netherlands
- Electricity sector in Norway
- Electricity sector in Romania
- Electricity sector in Russia
- Electricity sector in Serbia
- Electricity sector in Slovenia
- Electricity sector in Spain
- Electricity sector in Sweden
- Electricity sector in Switzerland
- Electricity in Turkey
- Electricity in Ukraine

== North America ==
- Electricity sector in Canada
  - History of electricity sector in Canada
- Electricity sector in the Dominican Republic
- Electricity sector in El Salvador
- Electricity sector in Haiti
- Electricity sector in Honduras
- Electricity sector in Mexico
- Electricity sector in Nicaragua
- Electricity sector of the United States

== Oceania ==
- Electricity sector in Australia
  - Green electricity in Australia
  - History of electricity supply in Queensland
- Electricity sector in New Zealand
  - Renewable electricity in New Zealand

== South America ==
- Electricity sector in Argentina
- Electricity sector in Brazil
- Electricity sector in Chile
- Electricity sector in Colombia
- Electricity sector in Cuba
- Electricity sector in Guyana
- Electricity sector in Paraguay
- Electricity sector in Peru
- Electricity sector in Uruguay
- Electricity sector in Venezuela

== See also ==
- Electric power industry
- List of power stations
