= Electric energy by country =

Electric energy by country may refer to:

- Electricity by country
  - List of countries by electricity production
  - List of countries by electricity consumption
- Mains electricity by country (incl. list of countries with the plugs, voltages and frequencies)
