= Energy in Djibouti =

Djibouti's electrical energy is supplied primarily by thermal plants (about 120 MW) and imported hydroelectricity from Ethiopia. However, the supplemental supply of power from Ethiopia does not always satisfy Djibouti's demand for power. According to USAID's Energy sector overview for Djibouti, Djibouti has the potential to generate more than 300MW of electrical power from renewable energy sources, and much more from other resources. Based on 2020 data, Djibouti's national electrification rate reached 42%, (1% in rural areas, 54% in urban areas).

== Renewable energy ==
Djibouti has vast untapped renewable energy sources, namely geothermal, solar, and wind.

== Electricity ==
The peak annual demand in 2014 was about 90 MW but is expected that it will grow to about 300 MW by around 2020. Electricity supply services are provided through the vertically integrated utility Electricité de Djibouti (EDD). A small amount of additional energy is generated by a solar plant (300 kW capacity). Djibouti has wind and geothermal generation potential and is actively studying these options.

Djibouti's Vision 2035 aims to achieve universal electricity access and power the nation with 100% renewable energy. Already, it sources approximately 65% of its electricity from Ethiopia (mainly hydroelectricity; renewable) via an intertie, reducing its reliance on imported fossil fuels.
