= Electricity sector in the Czech Republic =

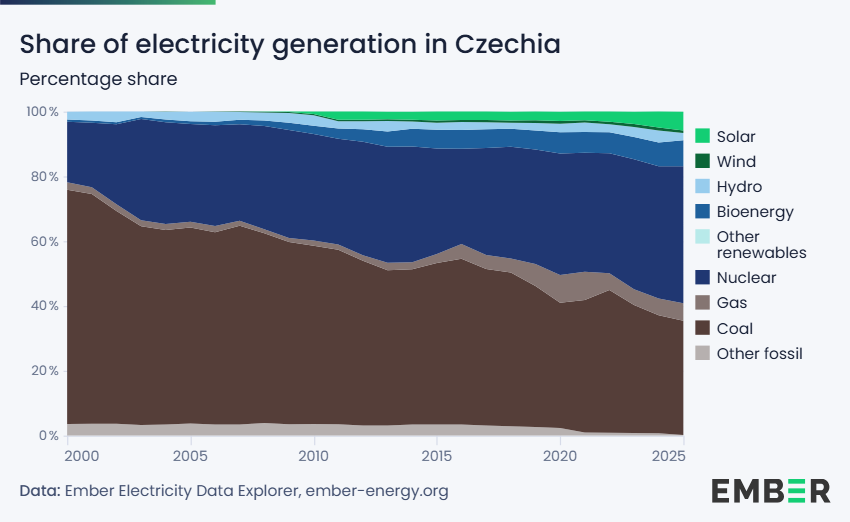
Share of electricity generation in the Czech Republic - percentage share

The Czech Republic is a long-term net exporter of electricity. 97%-98% of oil used in the Czech Republic is imported.

== Overview ==
The government's 2015 energy policy designates nuclear power as main source of energy and its share is projected to rise to between 46% and 58% by 2040. Coal-powered energy is planned to fall to 21%, while renewables would rise to 25% and gas range from 5 to 15%.

The updated energy strategy of 2019 envisions a gradual phase out of coal power share in total electricity generation from 2015's 46.2% down to 15.5% by 2040. The strategy sees nuclear energy as a non-carbon source of energy to be used during a slow transition to renewables in order to minimize the use of carbon-emitting fossil fuels that cause climate change. The increase in the share of nuclear, renewables and natural gas is to fill in the energy demand created by the impending gradual shutdowns of coal power stations. This 2015-approved energy strategy expects construction of an additional nuclear reactor in the Temelín Nuclear Power Station and another one in the Dukovany Nuclear Power Station with the possibility of further expansion to two reactors in each power station. The older station of the two, Dukovany, is to be expanded before Temelín. As of 2019, the financing models and contractor selection for the planned reactors are being negotiated by the government.

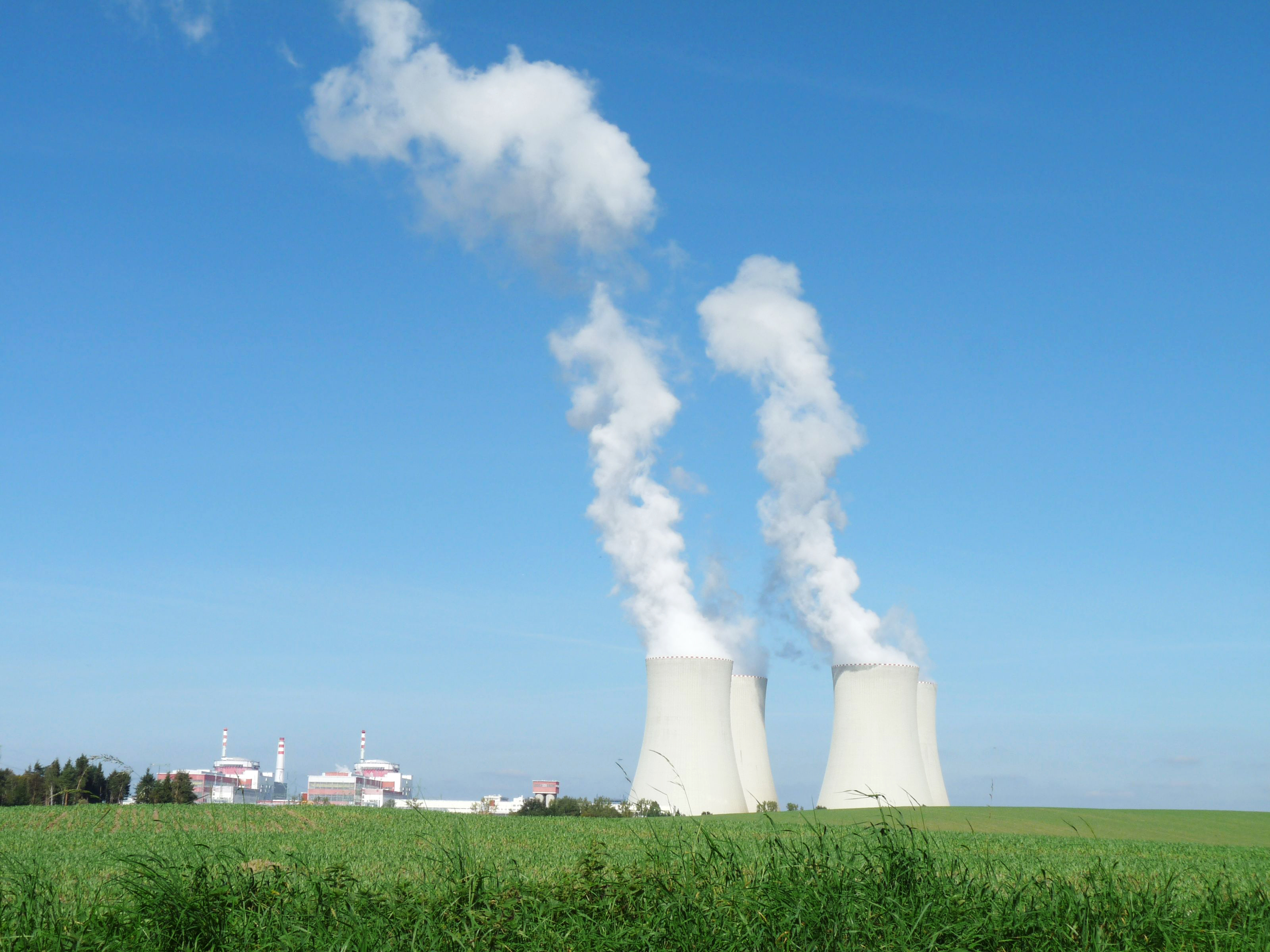
Temelín Nuclear Power Station and its cooling towers

2019 national energy strategy
Energy source	2015	2040
Coal	46.2%	15.5%
Nuclear	31.5%	43.2%
Natural gas	4.8%	8.2%
Renewables	10.1%	20.2%

In 2025, the Czech Republic generated 76.4 TWh of electricity, while net electricity consumption was 60.7 TWh.

== Nuclear power ==
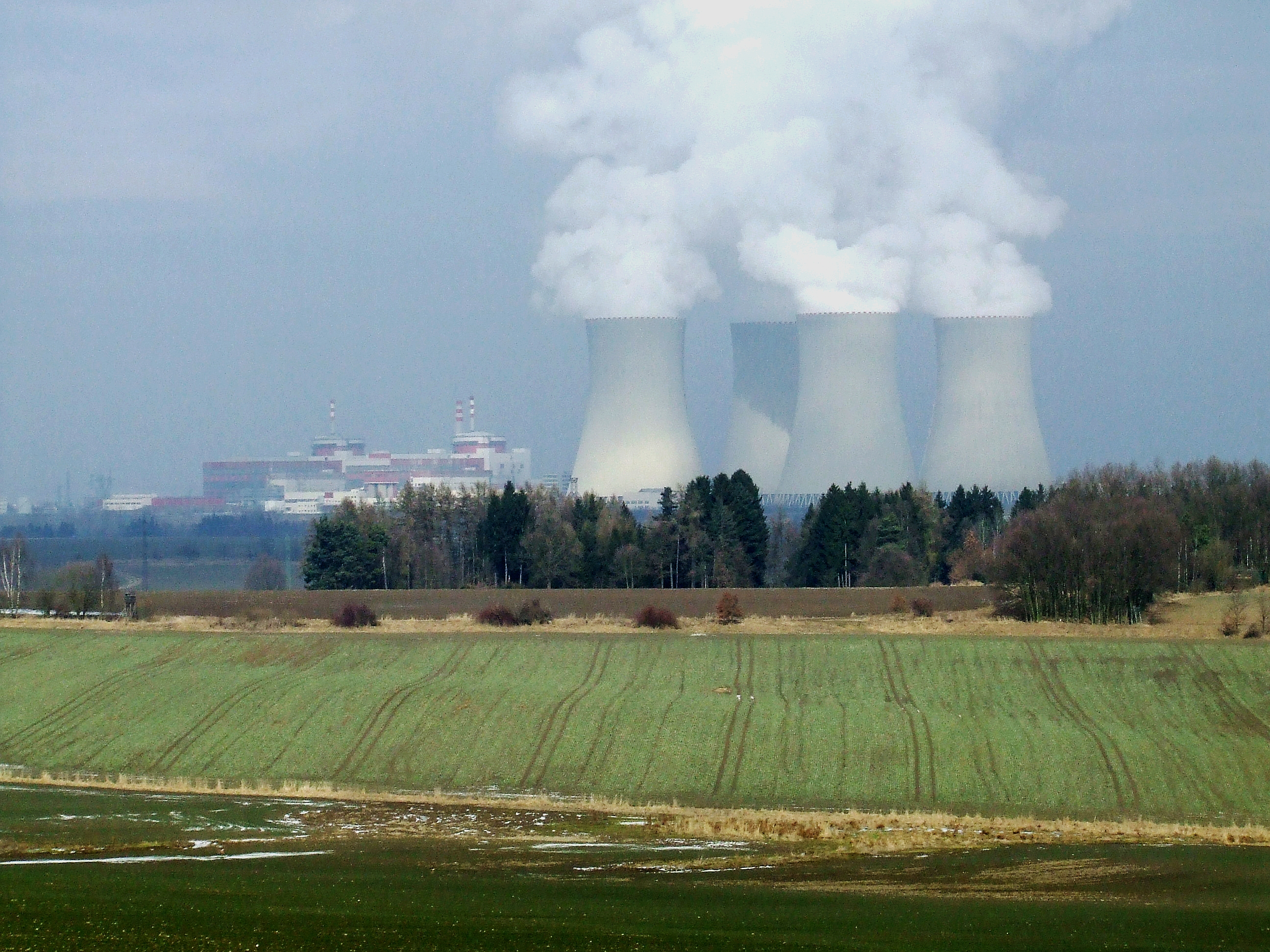
Temelín Nuclear Power Station

There are two nuclear power plants in the Czech Republic

== Renewable energy ==
In 2010 there was photovoltaics (PV) solar power 1,953 MW - fourth top in the EU.

In 2010 there was 471 MW solar heating - 10th top in the EU.

In 2010 there was 215 MW wind power - 18th top in the EU.

EU and the Czech Republic Wind Energy Capacity (MW)
No	Country	2012	2011	2010	2009	2008	2007	2006	2005	2004	2003	2002	2001	2000	1999	1998
-	EU-27	105,696	93,957	84,074	74,767	64,712	56,517	48,069	40,511	34,383	28,599	23,159	17,315	12,887	9,678	6,453
20	Czech Republic	260	217	215	192	150	116	54	28	17	9	3	0	0	0	0

== See also ==
- Renewable energy in the Czech Republic
- Nuclear power in the Czech Republic
