= Electricity sector in Portugal =

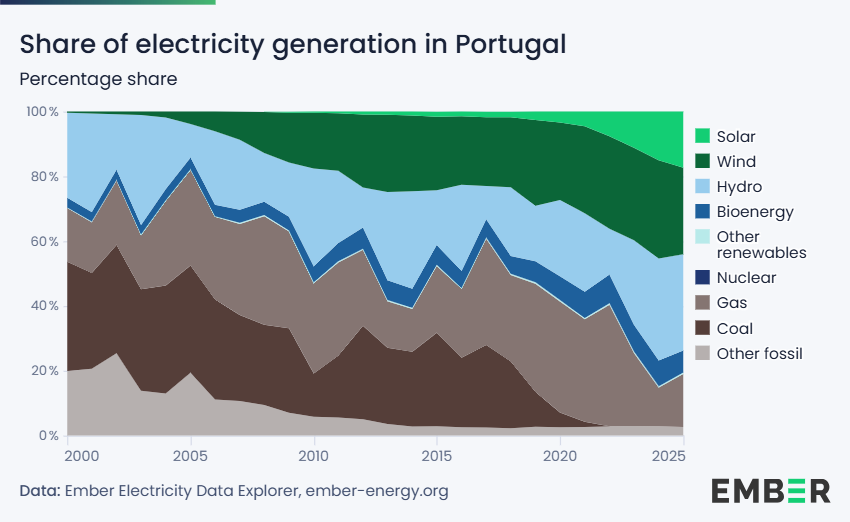
Share of electricity generation in Portugal - percentage share

Portugal electricity production 1980-2019

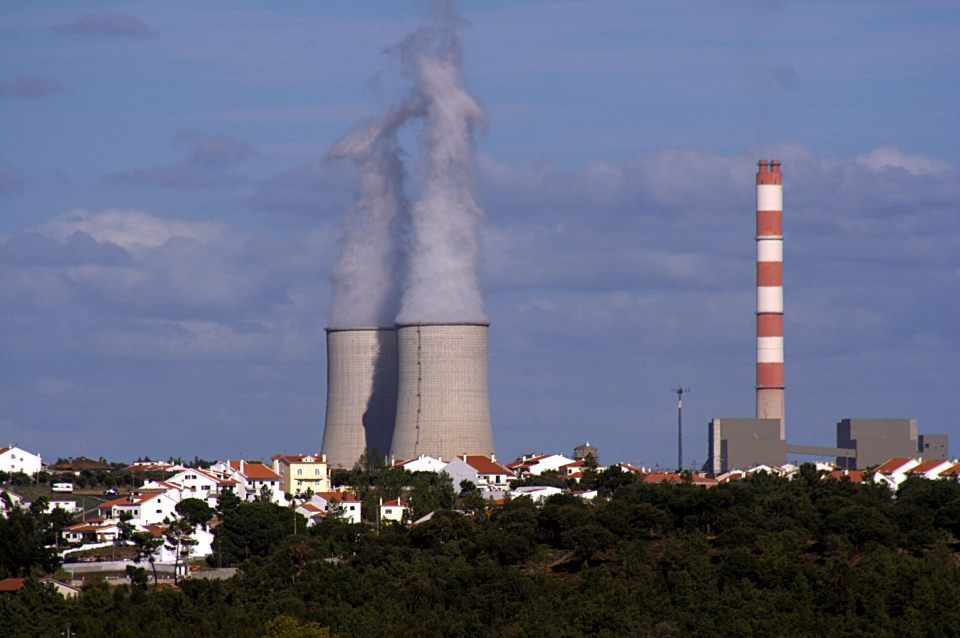
Pego power plant

In 2008, Net electricity use in Portugal (gross production + imports – exports – losses) was 51.2 TWh. Portugal imported 9 TWh electricity in 2008. Population was 10.6 million.

In 2018 electricity was generated by 23% hydroelectricity, 26% natural gas, 22% wind, 20% coal, 5% biomass, 2% solar and 2% oil. In 2019 electricity was generated by 19% hydroelectricity, 32% natural gas, 26% wind, 10% coal, 6% biomass, 2% solar, 2% oil and 1% other combustibles.

By 2023, the share of renewable power sources of Portugal's electricity rose to 61% (from 49% in 2022). Grid operator REN attributes the record percentage to favorable weather conditions.

Portugal aims to generate 85% of its electricity from renewables by 2030 and achieve carbon neutrality by 2045, five years ahead of its initial target.

== Hydro ==
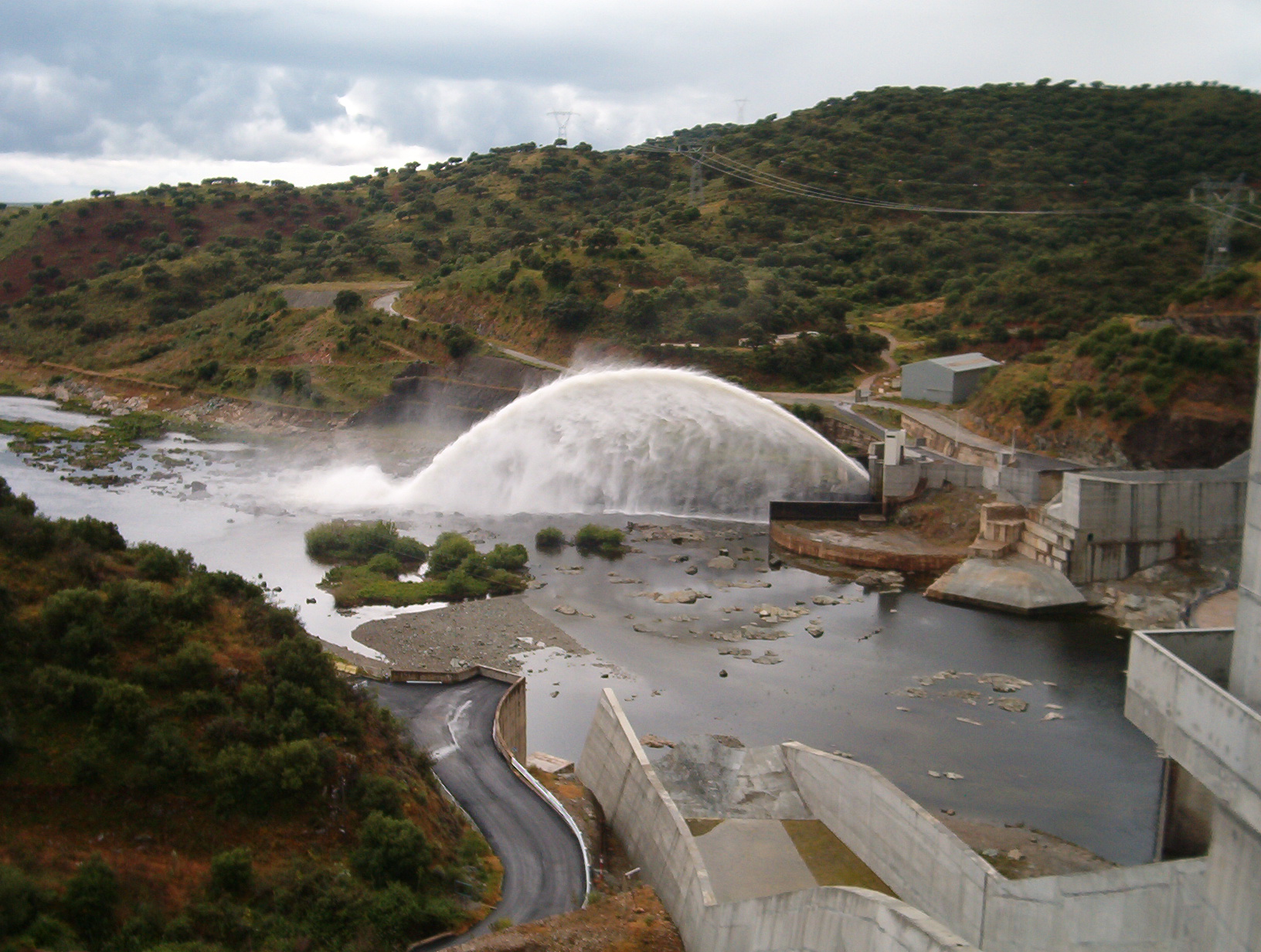
Alqueva Dam

The pumped-storage hydroelectricity plant at Frades works as 880 MW for generation and 780 MW for pumping.

== Wind power ==
Portugal produced 20% of electricity with wind power in 2017 and had the average year capacity of 14% of wind power in the end 2010. Wind power capacity was 3,357 MW in end 2009 and 3,702 MW in end 2010.

EU and Portugal Wind Energy Capacity (MW)
No	Country	2012	2011	2010	2009	2008	2007	2006	2005	2004	2003	2002	2001	2000	1999	1998
-	EU-27	105,696	93,957	84,074	74,767	64,712	56,517	48,069	40,511	34,383	28,599	23,159	17,315	12,887	9,678	6,453
6	Portugal	4,525	4,083	3,898	3,535	2,862	2,150	1,716	1,022	522	296	195	131	100	61	60

== Solar power ==
In Lisbon, the energy payback time (see also EROEI) in the roof top solar photovoltaic (PV) technology is less than 2 years and less than in Sydney, Munich, Athens or Barcelona, but some more than in Madrid, Los Angeles or Ankara.

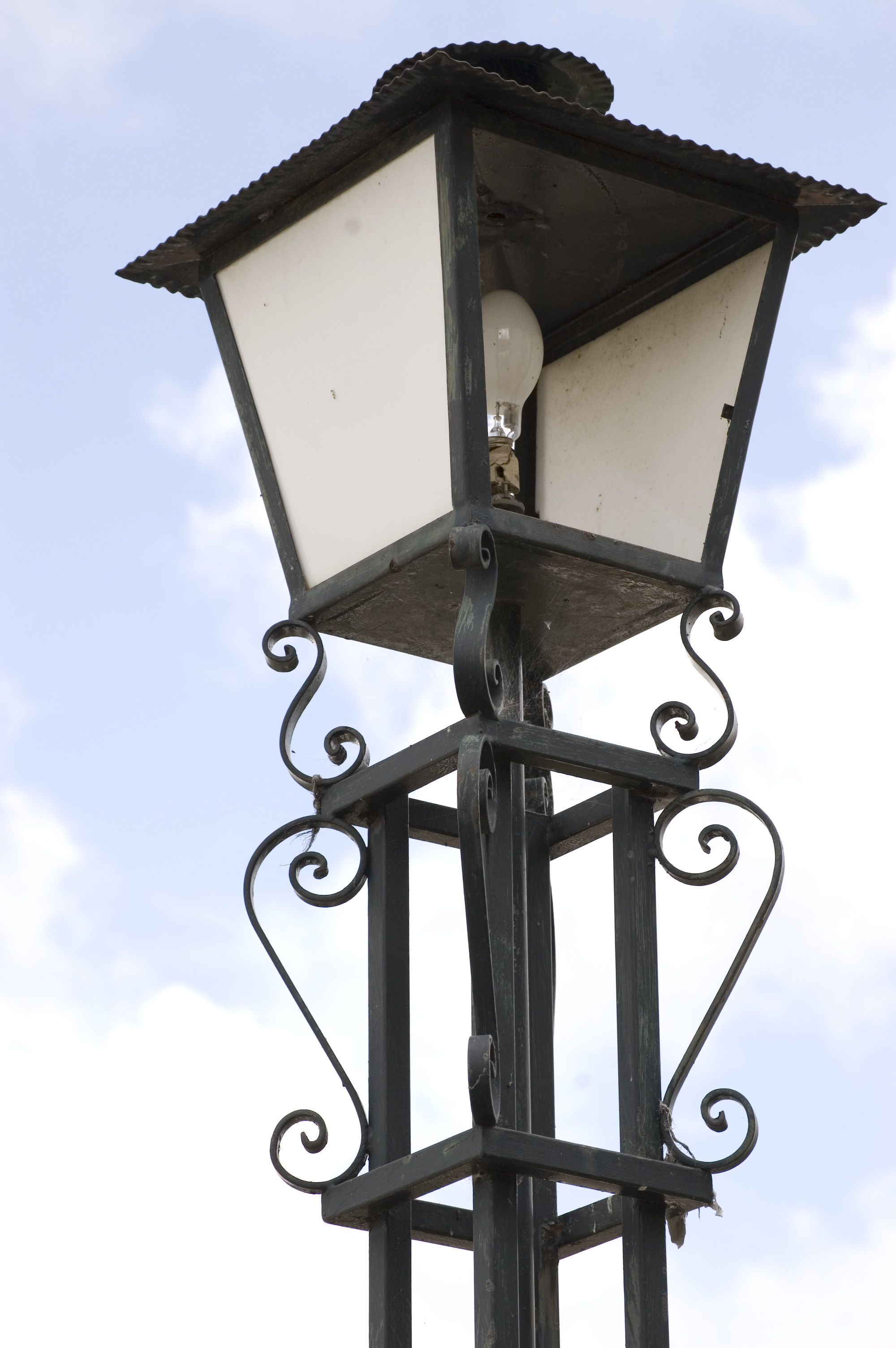
A Portuguese street lamp

== Transmission ==
External images
- 2004 High voltage grid of Spain and Portugal Archive
- Collection of current grid maps

Redes Energéticas Nacionais manages the high voltage power lines.

In 2014, Portugal had an electricity interconnection level (international transmission capacity relative to production capacity) of 7%, below the recommended 10% level. Exchange only occurs with Spain.
