= Electricity sector in Estonia =

Estonia's electricity sector is interconnected with regional energy markets, particularly through connections with Finland and Latvia. The direct electrical interconnection with Finland was established in 2006 and was further strengthened by the Estlink 2 interconnector in 2014. Estonia joined the Nord Pool Spot market by 2012, securing its own price area within this regional electricity market.

In 2018, oil shale constituted approximately 80% of Estonia's electricity consumption. By 2024, this figure had declined to 34.9%, reflecting a significant decrease in oil shale utilization for electricity generation. Concurrently, there has been an increase in the adoption of renewable energy sources, notably biomass, wind energy, and solar photovoltaic (PV). In 2024, 21.9% of the electricity production was biomass, 21.2% wind energy, and 18.3% solar photovoltaic. Significant transformations in the oil shale-based electricity production infrastructure include the commissioning of the new Auvere Power Plant in 2018 and the decommissioning of older facilities.

In Estonia's electricity market, Eesti Energia is the largest seller with a 60% market share and owns the largest distribution network, representing 86% of the distribution market. The Estonian Competition Authority (ECA) regulates transmission and distribution rates, as well as connection charges.

== Statistics ==
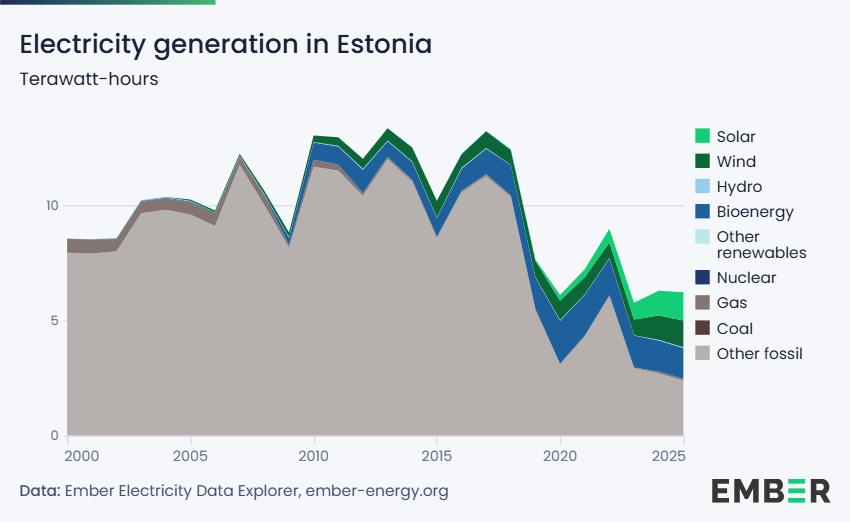
Electricity generation in Estonia in terawatt-hours

Electricity in 2020:

- Usage - 9.17 billion kWh
- Production - 5.9 billion kWh
- Import - 7.37 billion kWh
- Export - 3.72 billion kWh

Estonia's all-time peak consumption is 1591 MW (in 2021).

In 2021 the electricity generated from renewable energy sources was 29.3 %, being 38% of the share of renewable energy in gross final energy consumption.

== Production ==
=== Fossil fuels ===
Oil-based fuels, including oil shale and fuel oils, accounted for about 80% of domestic production in 2016. There is also some natural gas capacity, but no coal generation. The largest power complex in the country, Narva Power Plants, consists of the world's two largest oil shale-fired thermal power plants.

The complex used to generate about 95% of total power production in Estonia in 2007. Falling to 86% in 2016 and 73% in 2018.

Oil shale extracted by the state-owned Eesti Energia fell from 16.6 million tons in 2016 to 7.9 million tons in 2021.

=== Renewables ===
In October 2022 Estonia set a target date of 2030 to generate 100% electricity from renewables.

==== Wind power ====
Total installed wind power was 149 MW at end of 2010 and grew to 303 MW in 2014 and 329 MW in 2016. Record production of wind parks is 279 MW in 2014.

Estonia has target of 14% (1.5 TWh) and total renewable electricity 1.9 TWh (17.6%). According to the national Energy Action Plan (2020) planned shares are onshore 9% and offshore 5%. The state energy company Eesti Energia was interested in offshore wind energy in 2008.

==== Other renewables and facilities ====
The rest of Estonia's generation is from other renewable fuels. Wood-based fuels were the second largest source of power in 2016. The rest comes from waste and other biofuels, as well as a small amount of hydropower.

A 26.5 MW / 53.1 MWh grid battery started operating in Auvere in February 2025. A 100 MW / 200 MWh grid battery (€100 million) being tested in Kiisa disturbed the two Estlink cables importing 1000 MW from Finland on January 20, 2026.

=== Nuclear ===
According to the International Energy Agency's (IEA) 2023 Energy Policy Review for Estonia, the country is assessing the potential adoption of nuclear power into its energy portfolio, with a decision expected in 2024. This follows a 2020 Cabinet decision that led to the creation of the Nuclear Energy Program Implementing Organization (NEPIO), which is responsible for assessing the feasibility of nuclear energy. NEPIO is tasked with delivering a nuclear program framework by December 2023, supportive of Estonia's objectives to diversify its energy sources and reduce dependence on fossil fuels. If approved, the start of nuclear electricity production is anticipated for 2035, with the required investments anticipated to be sourced from the private sector.

== Transmission and trade ==
Estonia's grid is an important hub as it is connected to Finland in the north, Russia in the east, Latvia and Lithuania in the south. Electricity is traded on the Nordic power market Nord Pool. In 2014–2016, yearly net imports from Finland were equal to 31-67% of consumption. Meanwhile, yearly new exports to Latvia were equal to 57-84% of consumption. Some years there were also exports to Russia.

Between Estonia and Finland there are the submarine Estlink cables.

It was agreed in 2018 that Estonia, Latvia and Lithuania will connect to the European Union's electricity system and desynchronize from the Russian BRELL power system, this was completed by February 2025.

== See also ==
- Energy in Estonia
