= Electricity sector in Ethiopia =

Overview of electricity in Ethiopia

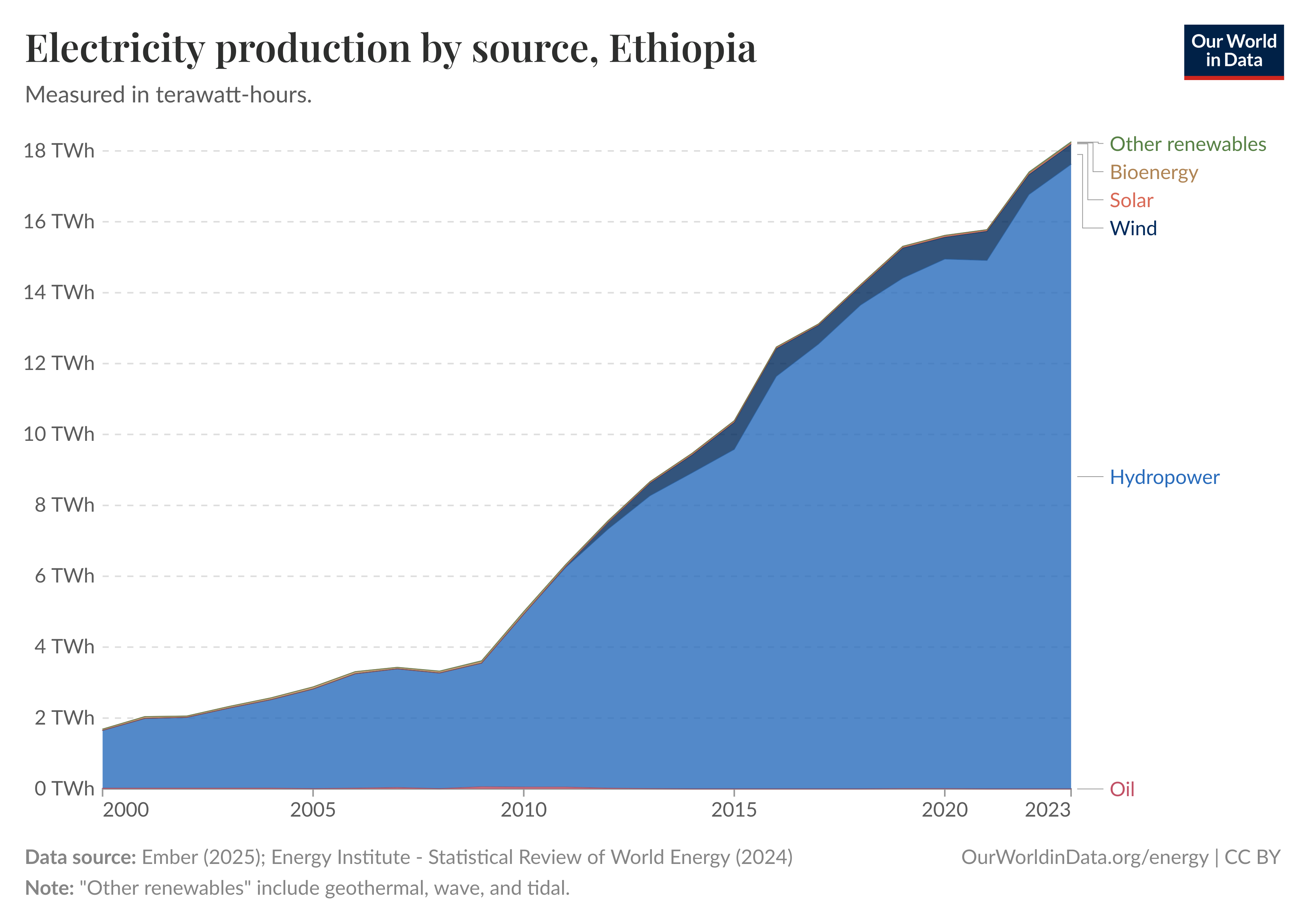
Electricity production in Ethiopia by source

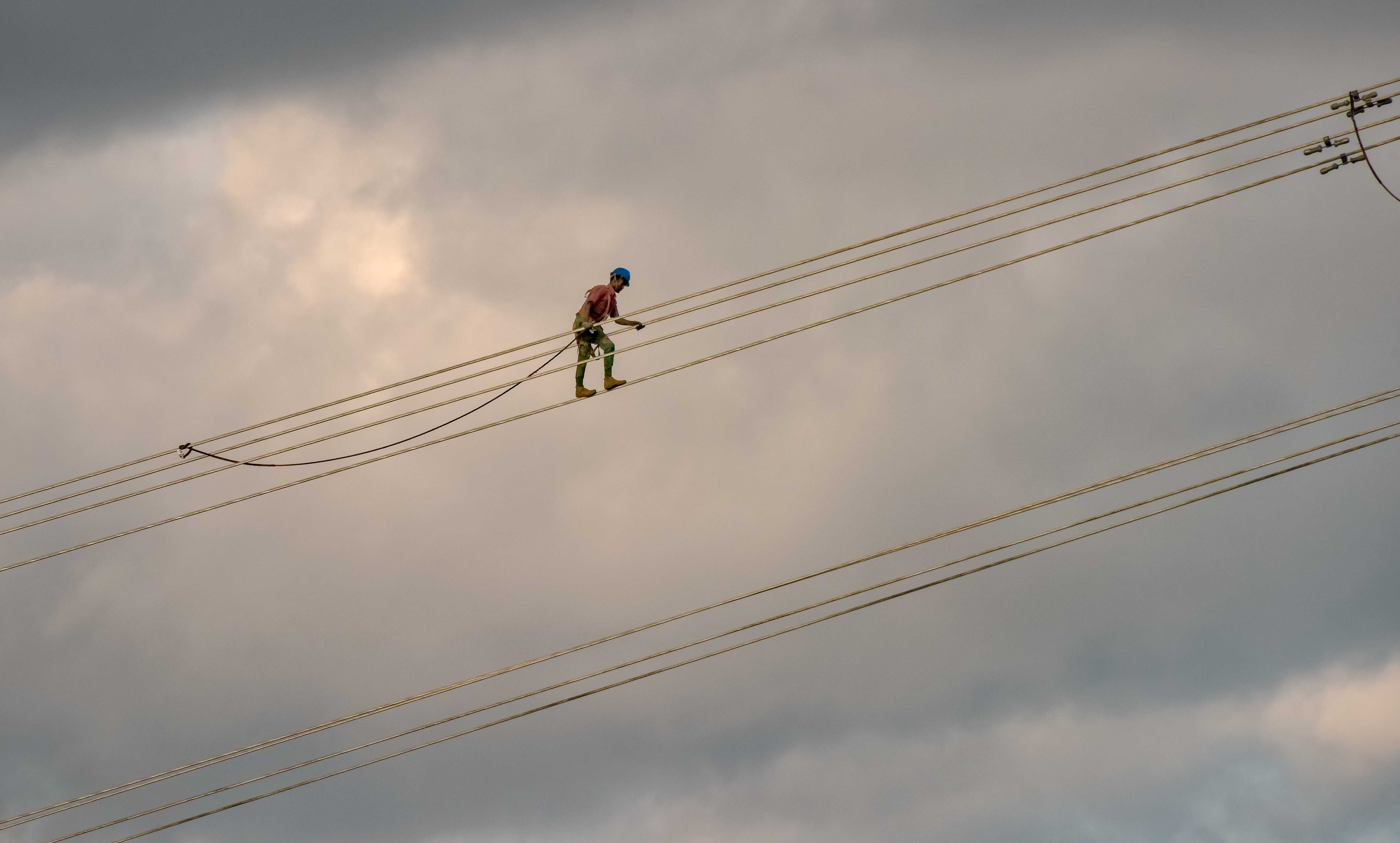
Lineman on a conductor bundle of the Ethiopia–Kenya 500 kV HVDC Interconnector (power line under construction) in Ethiopia.

Ethiopia has abundant resources that can generate 60,000 TWh electricity from hydroelectric, wind, solar and geothermal sources. The electrification process causes GDP growth and high public demand for 110 million of its population. On total, Ethiopia produces 14 TWh (14,000 GWh) from all facilities and exports other resources like natural gas or crude oil.

There are numerous restraints over electrification with most people in rural areas utilize traditional biomass energy sources and lack of modernized transmission and distribution. To solve this, the government set up big projects to construct hydroelectric dams such as the Grand Ethiopian Renaissance Dam (GERD) and Koysha Dam that provide fertile electricity throughout the country. The other issues is power outage that can adversely affects households from daily interruption by the Ethiopian Electric Utility. Frequent power outage may lead to serious threat to people such as fear and discomfort to the environment as well as the use of alternative energy sources like charcoal, firewoods and candle.

== Overview ==
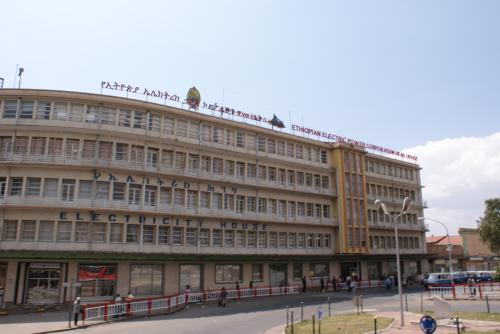
The Ethiopian Electric Power building in Addis Ababa

Ethiopia has abundant renewable energy resources that potentially generates 60,000 TWh of electric power from hydroelectric, wind, solar and geothermal sources. This boosted the GDP growth over past decades and increased electricity demand for public. However, the country is experiencing energy shortages and load shedding as it strive to offer supply for over 110 million people and predicted to grow 2.5% per year. With current ongoing projects, the country is constructing 4,500 MW of installed generation capacity. There is also plan to increase installed generation capacity in exponent to 17,000 MW in 10 years.

Summary table

| Resources | Unit | Exploitable reserve | Exploited percent |
|---|---|---|---|
| Hydropower | MW | 45,000 | <5% |
| Solar/day | kWh/m2 | 4 – 6 | <1% |
| Wind, power and speed | GW m/s | 100 >7 | <1% |
| Geothermal | MW | <10,000 | <1% |
| Agricultural waste | Million tons | 15-20 | 30% |
| Natural gas | Billion m3 | 113 | 0% |
| Coal | Million tons | 300 | 0% |
| Oil shale | Million tons | 253 | 0% |

According to Worldometers, Ethiopia generated 11,116,860 MWh of electricity as of 2016 (covering 123% of its annual consumption needs). Totally, Ethiopia produces 11 billion kWh from all facilities. The rest of self produced is either exported into other countries or unused. Thus, import–export is crucial to the energy sector involving sources like natural gas or crude oil.

=== Data ===
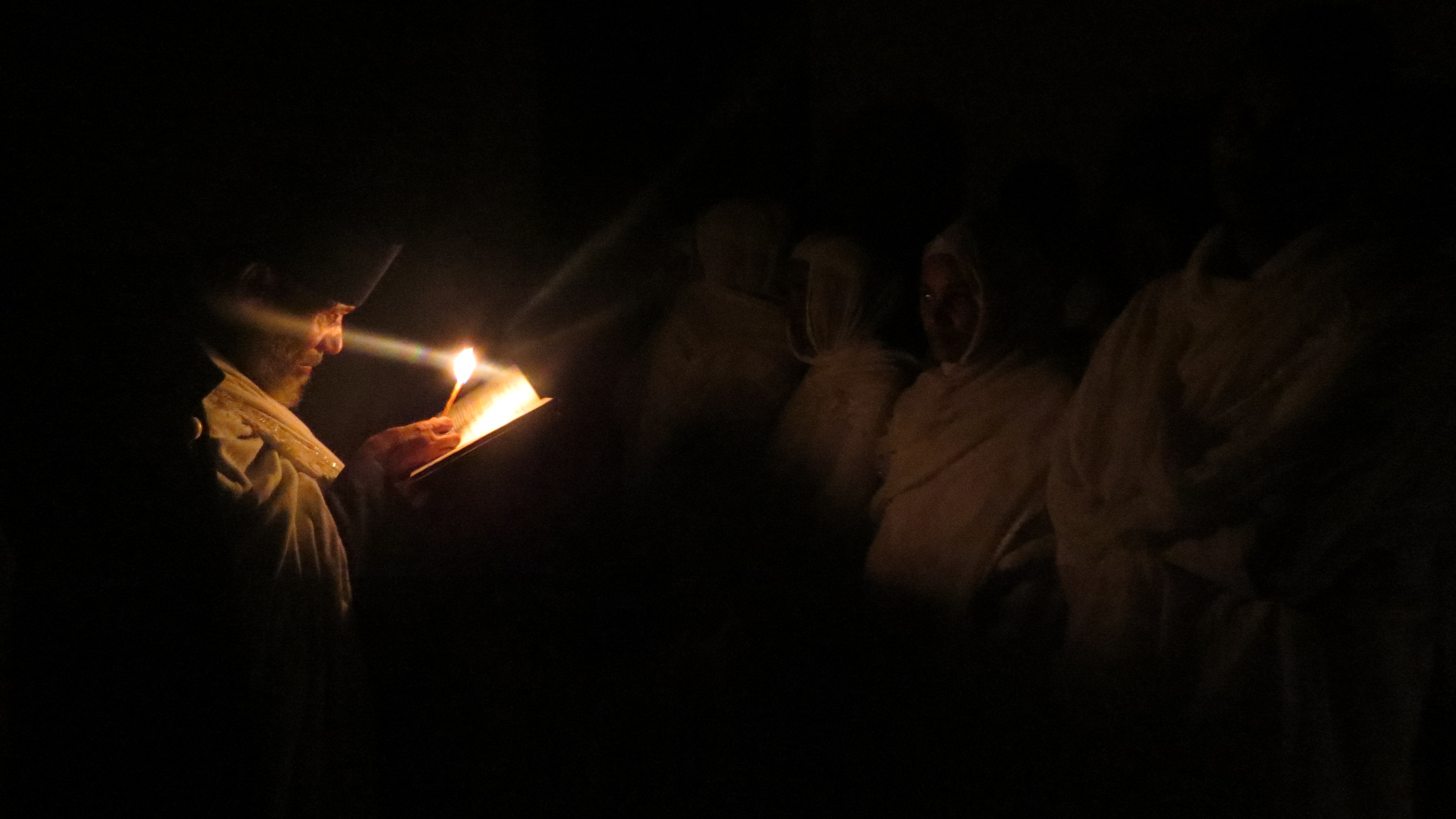
Priest reading with candle during Orthodox wedding

Despite being potential, the availability of electricity still at infancy age and Ethiopia remained the lowest electricity consumption per capita in Africa. The majority rural population are utilizing traditional biomass energy sources than modern one, which accounted about 45.8 out of 49.9 million tonnes of oil equivalent of total primary energy supply in 2015.

According to Ministry of Water, Irrigation and Electricity in 2017, access to electrical grid was about 56% and household connectivity was only about 25%. By 2014, estimated electricity consumption was about 70 kWh per capita and increased to 100 kWh by 2017. However, it was lower than other African countries in terms of per capita. The government began strategic priorities in the energy sector, for example universal electrification access, energy efficiency improvement, developing decentralized off-grid power generation, and exporting electricity to neighboring countries. A number of big projects were set up to construct largest dams for electrification: the Koysha and Grand Ethiopian Renaissance Dam (GERD) are under construction to increase energy production.

== Power outage ==
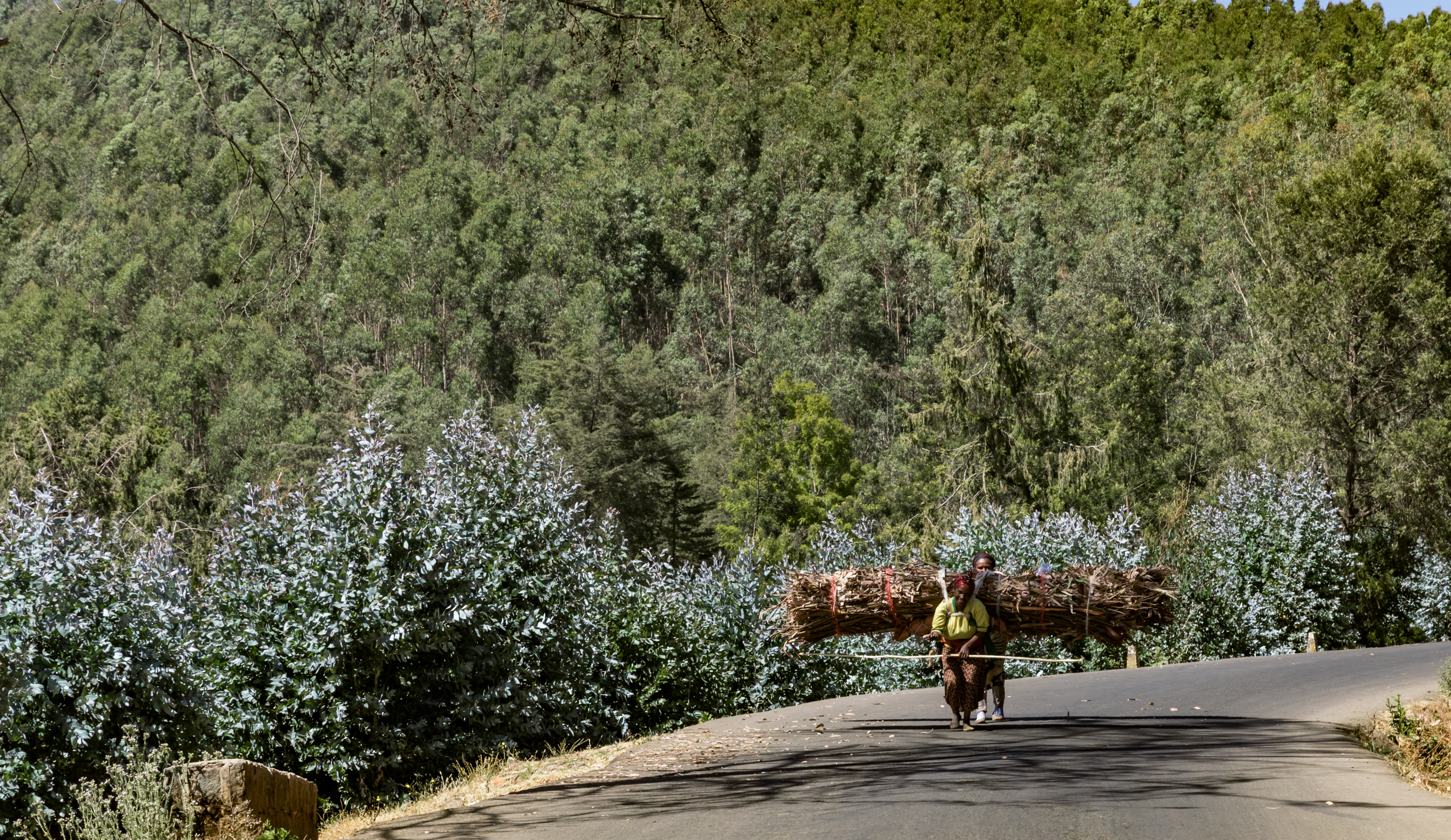
For some impoverished people, particularly in rural areas, firewood used as a source of energy in Ethiopia.

In 2018, access of electricity in Ethiopia reached 45%, and power generation, especially hydropower, tripled in a decade from about 850 MW to above 2,000 MW. According to the World Bank, power outage of Ethiopia occurred 8.2 times in a typical month, each average duration of 5.8 hours. Similarly, in July 2015–June 2016, daily electricity interruption from the Ethiopian Electric Utility estimated on average duration about 1–9 minutes at the distribution lines in Addis Ababa. The reason behind the problem is poor physical condition and low capacity of transmission and distribution lines, though shortfall in supply and scheduled outages sometimes common.

Frequent outage may cause potential benefits from individuals households overall. Engida et al. (2011) using a static computable general equilibrium model, estimated loss of 3.1% of GDP in Ethiopia as a result of power outage in 2010. Power outage also critically concerned by manufacturing firms. For households, it can cause adverse effects into several forms which leads to incur alternative source of energy such as charcoal, candle, kerosene, firewood, liquefied petroleum gas and standby generators. It can also incites fears and discomfort such as inability to walk at night, loss of leisure time, inconvenience from alternative energy sources and environmental and health effects. In addition, it would impact on energy transition from solid fuels to modern energy by slowing down the connections.
