= Energy in Latvia =

Latvia is a net energy importer. Primary energy use in Latvia was 49 TWh, or 22 TWh per million persons in 2009. In 2018, electricity consumption per capita was 3731 kWh.

Latvia has adopted the EU target to produce 50% of its energy from renewable sources by 2030.

== Energy statistics ==
2020 energy statistics

Production capacities for electricity (billion kWh)
Type	Amount
Hydro	12.85
Fossil fuel	9.04
Biomass	4.30
Wind power	0.86591
Solar	0.02706
Total	27.08

Electricity (billion kWh)
Category	Amount
Consumption	6.71
Production	5.46
Import	4.17
Export	2.55

Crude Oil (barrels per day)
Consumption	39,900
Production	1,600

Natural Gas (billion m^{3})
Consumption	1.07
Import	1.07

CO_{2} emissions:
6.93 million tons

== Energy plan ==
The 2021-30 plan set a target of reducing greenhouse gas emissions by 65% compared to 1990. There is a target of being carbon neutral by 2050.

== Fuel types ==
=== Fossil fuel ===
==== Natural Gas ====
From 1 January 2023 Latvia banned the import of natural gas from Russia. The replacement comes from connections to LNG terminals, the Klaipėda LNG terminal in Lithuania, and from 2024 the recently opened Inkoo LNG terminal in Finland.

JSC Conexus Baltic Grid is the natural gas transmission system operator in Latvia. International transmission pipelines are 577 km long, consisting of the Riga–Pahneva, Pleskava–Riga, Izborska–Inčukalns UGS, Riga–Inčukalns UGS I - line, Riga–Inčukalns UGS II - line, Vireši–Tallinn pipelines. The total length of regional transmission pipelines is 613 km.

Latvia has underground gas storage facilities at the Inčukalns UGS, with a capacity of 4.47 billion m^{3}.

Natural gas companies include Latvijas Gāze.

=== Renewable energy ===
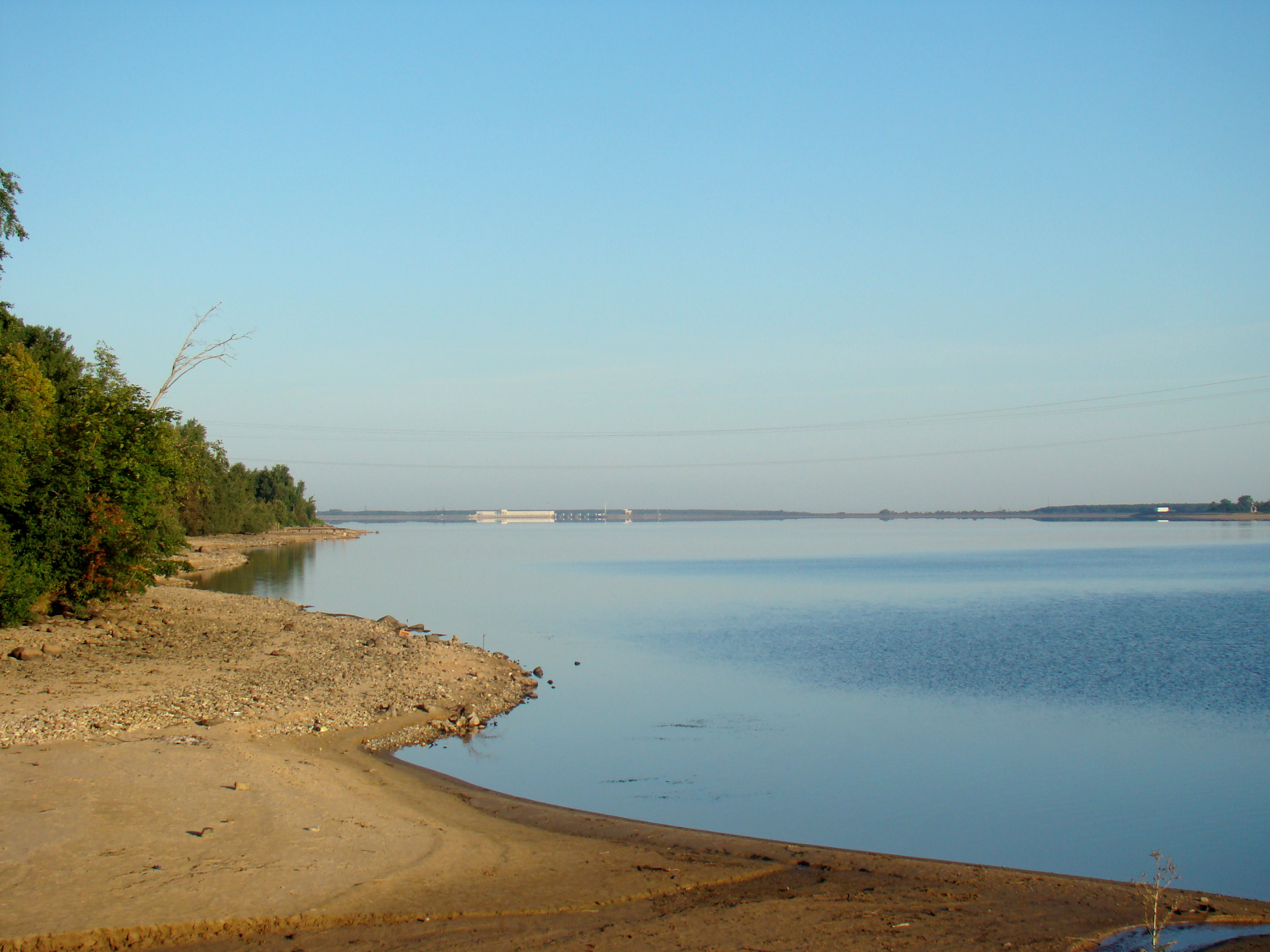
Riga Hydroelectric Power Plant on the Daugava River, seen in the distance

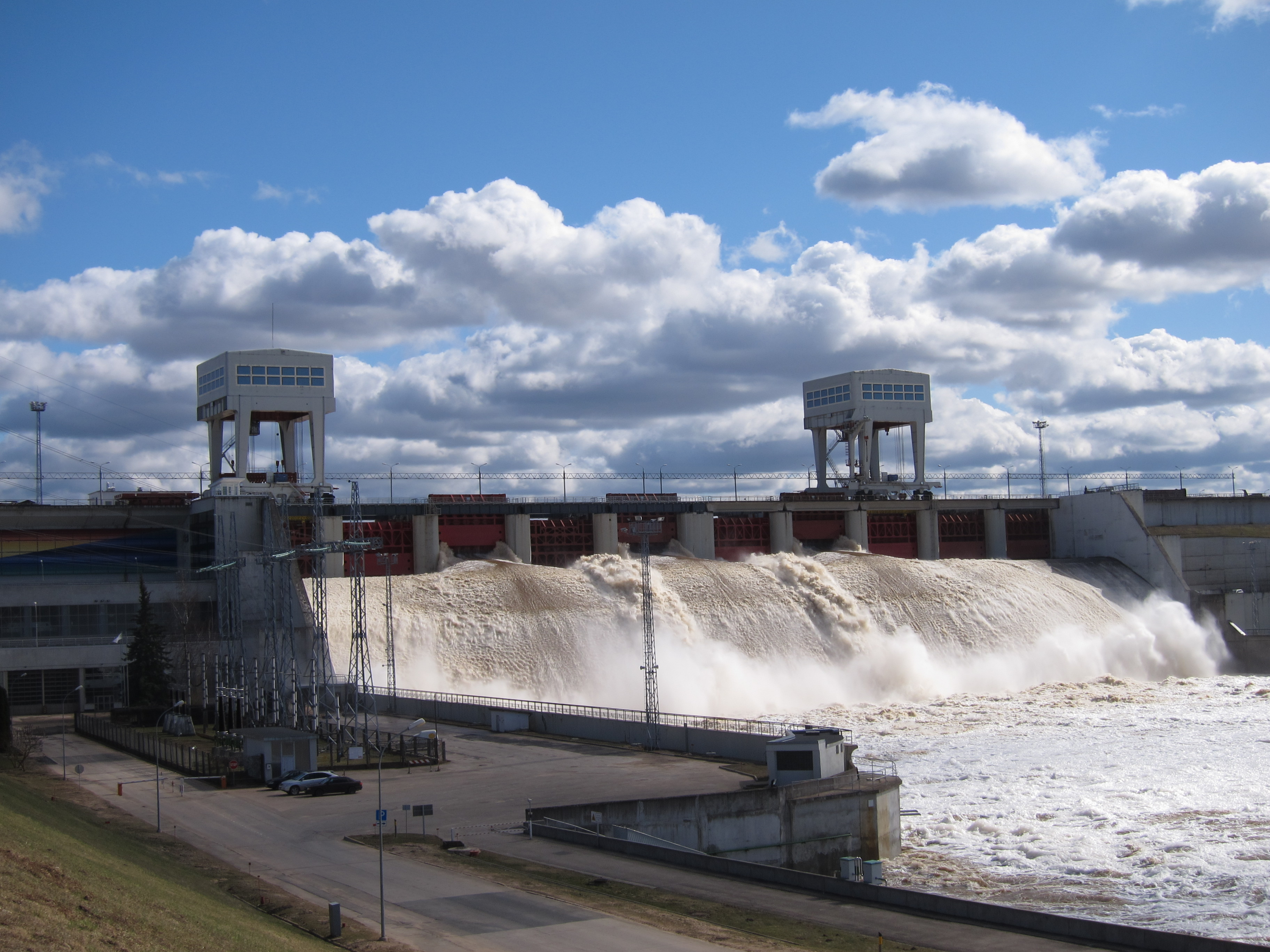
Pļaviņas Hydroelectric Power Station

Years in which the last three renewable power levels achieved
Achievement	Year	Achievement	Year	Achievement	Year
2%	1992	4%	2017	6%	not achieved

Renewable energy includes wind, solar, biomass and geothermal energy sources.

Almost half of the electricity used in the country is provided by renewable energy sources. The main renewable resource is hydroelectric power. Latvia has laws that regulate the building of power plants and plans to sell electricity at higher prices. This is a stimulus for investment, especially taking into consideration the fact that Latvia cannot offer big subsidies in order to attract investment. A production quota is approved for each renewable energy source every year.

The share of renewable energy in the gross final energy consumption in 2021 in Latvia was 42.1%, thanks to strong hydroelectric power.

==== Wind power ====
In 2021 Latvia had just 66 MW of wind energy capacity, with no wind farms being built since 2012.

In 2022 a wind farm is in the initial planning stage to be located in the Gulf of Riga, Latvia having rejected the idea of working with Estonia on a nearby project, the new plan is expected to supply 1 GW of clean wind energy, which would translate to 3 TWh (Terawatt-hours) of renewable energy.

==== Solar power ====
2023 will see the first two solar parks being completed in Latvia.

==== Biomass ====
Biomass provides over 10% of Latvia's electricity production capacity.

=== Hydro power ===
Hydro is an important power source in Latvia, Ķegums Hydroelectric Power Station is the oldest hydro power station in the country, built in 1940.

== Electricity ==
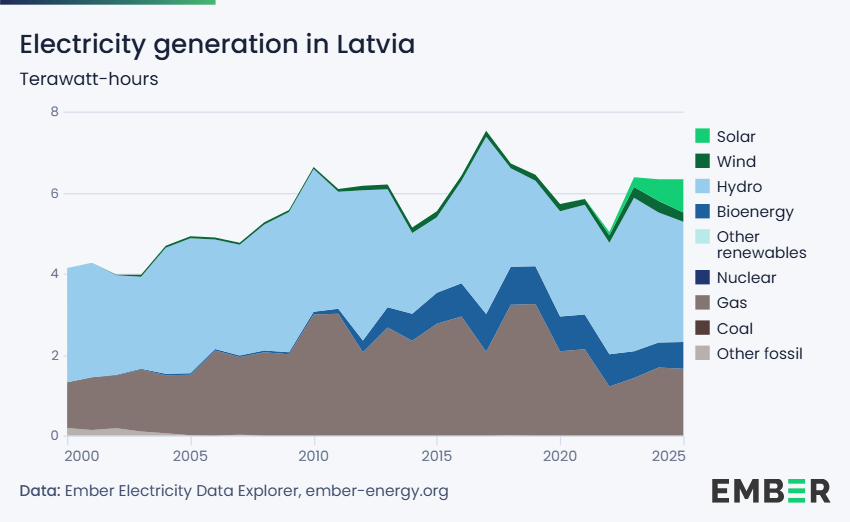
Electricity generation in Latvia in terawatt-hours

It was agreed in 2018 that Estonia, Latvia and Lithuania would connect to the European Union's electricity system and desynchronize from the Russian BRELL power system by February 2025. The project was successfully completed on 9 February 2025. A back up plan, should Russia disconnect the Baltic states before 2025, would enable a connection to the European grid to be completed within 24 hours.

Two grid batteries at 60 MW / 120 MWh and 20 MW / 40 MWh were commissioned in 2025. In June 2026, Rolls-Royce Power Systems announced a contract with Sunly for four utility-scale battery energy storage projects in Latvia, with a total capacity of 490 MWh; the first hybrid energy park, in Valmiera and combining storage with solar panels, was scheduled to be commissioned in 2027.

An interconnector called the Harmony Link Interconnector, linking Lithuania with Poland is to be built by 2030, important for harmonising the system.

== See also ==
- Energy in Estonia
- Energy in Lithuania
