= Electricity sector in Luxembourg =

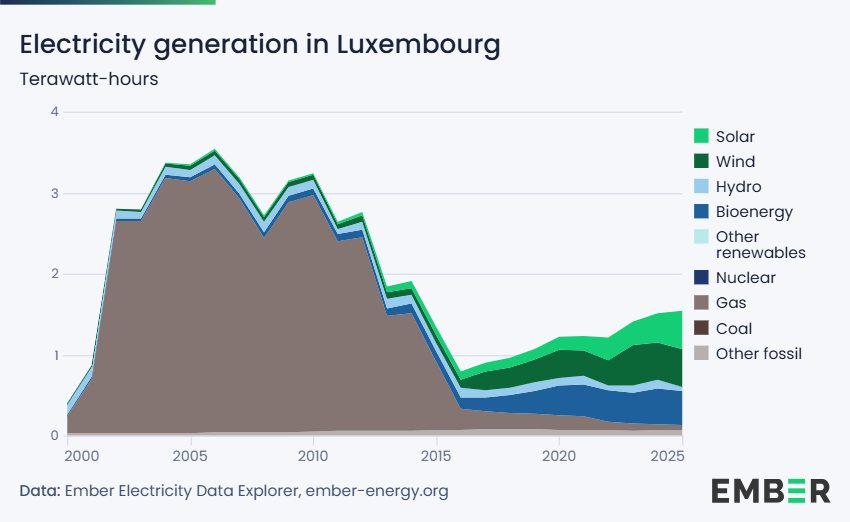
Electricity generation in Luxembourg in terawatt-hours

Electricity sector in Luxembourg describes electricity issues in Luxembourg. Luxembourg is a member of OECD and European Union. Luxembourg imports most of its energy. Luxembourg is the EU country with the second smallest forecast of renewables in 2020. Luxembourg has one of the highest emissions of carbon dioxide per person in Europe.

== Use ==
According to IEA, the electricity use (gross production + imports – exports – transmission/distribution losses) in Luxembourg in 2008 was 7.7 TWh and population 0.49 million people. Luxembourg was dependent on imported energy in 2008. Own production was 2% of primary energy in 2008. In 2008, electricity use per person in Luxembourg was 2.6 times greater than in the United Kingdom.

== Wind power ==
Total installed wind power was 42 MW at end of 2010. In the end of 2010 the installed wind power equalled in average 1.1% of electricity use. The European average was 5.3%. Wind power share was only lower than in Luxembourg in Latvia, Czech Republic, Finland, Slovakia, Slovenia and Malta Wind power target capacity in 2020 is 131 MW and 3.6% of electricity. According to EWEA 300 MW of installed wind capacity in Luxembourg could cover up to 14% of the country's electricity consumption.

== Global warming ==
Emissions of carbon dioxide in total, per capita in 2007 were 22.4 tons CO_{2} compared to EU 27 average 7.9 tons CO_{2}.

In 2009 the emissions of carbon dioxide in total, per capita in Luxembourg were 21.5 tons CO_{2} compared to the European average 7.1 tons CO_{2}. The % change between 2008 and 2009 was both in Europe and North America minus 6.9% but in Luxembourg minus 11.2%. Globally annual declines of the country specific global warming emissions were substantially influenced by the financial recession of the world during 2008–2009 instead of measurable sustainable changes in the emissions sources development. The annual decline of 11.2% CO_{2} in Luxembourg was 14th to 16th top decline in the world sharing the same value with Belgium and Ireland. Decline was the highest in Ukraine (−28,2 %), Brunei (−27,1), Tonga (−23,1) and Nigeria (−22,4).

== European Union targets ==
Only Luxembourg (−2.1%) and Italy (−0.9%), have informed the European Commission that they envisage using the cooperation mechanisms to meet their national renewable energy target 11% by 2020. Luxembourg is the EU country with the second smallest forecast penetration of renewables, with the NREAP assuming that only 12% of electricity consumption will be met by renewables in 2020.
