= Electricity sector in Romania =

Electricity sector of Romania

About 15% of the final consumption of energy in Romania is consumed as electricity.

In accordance with EU directives and climate control ambitions, additional effort and money was put into improving renewable energy sources. The target of 24% renewable energy was reached in 2020.

Since the 2022 Russian Invasion of Ukraine the need to strengthen and diversify sources of electricity was given a boost. A target of 30.7% renewable energy generation has been set, to be achieved by 2030; however there are plans to increase this to 34%.

Consumption in 2022 was 51.7089 TWh (terawatt hours), 7.2% less than 2021. 7.3251 million TWh were exported in 2022.

In 2022 and 2023 improved connections were with neighbouring Moldova, bringing it into the European grid, with Romania supplying Moldova with electricity.

Electricity transmission system operator Transelectrica is scheduled to have a 3 GW wind energy capacity by 2026. 1.9 GW of offshore wind is planned for 2027-28. A 200 MW / 400 MWh grid battery was connected in 2025, and a €460 million 761 MWp / 534 MW AC solar park with 1 GWh battery started construction in 2026.

== Electricity generation ==
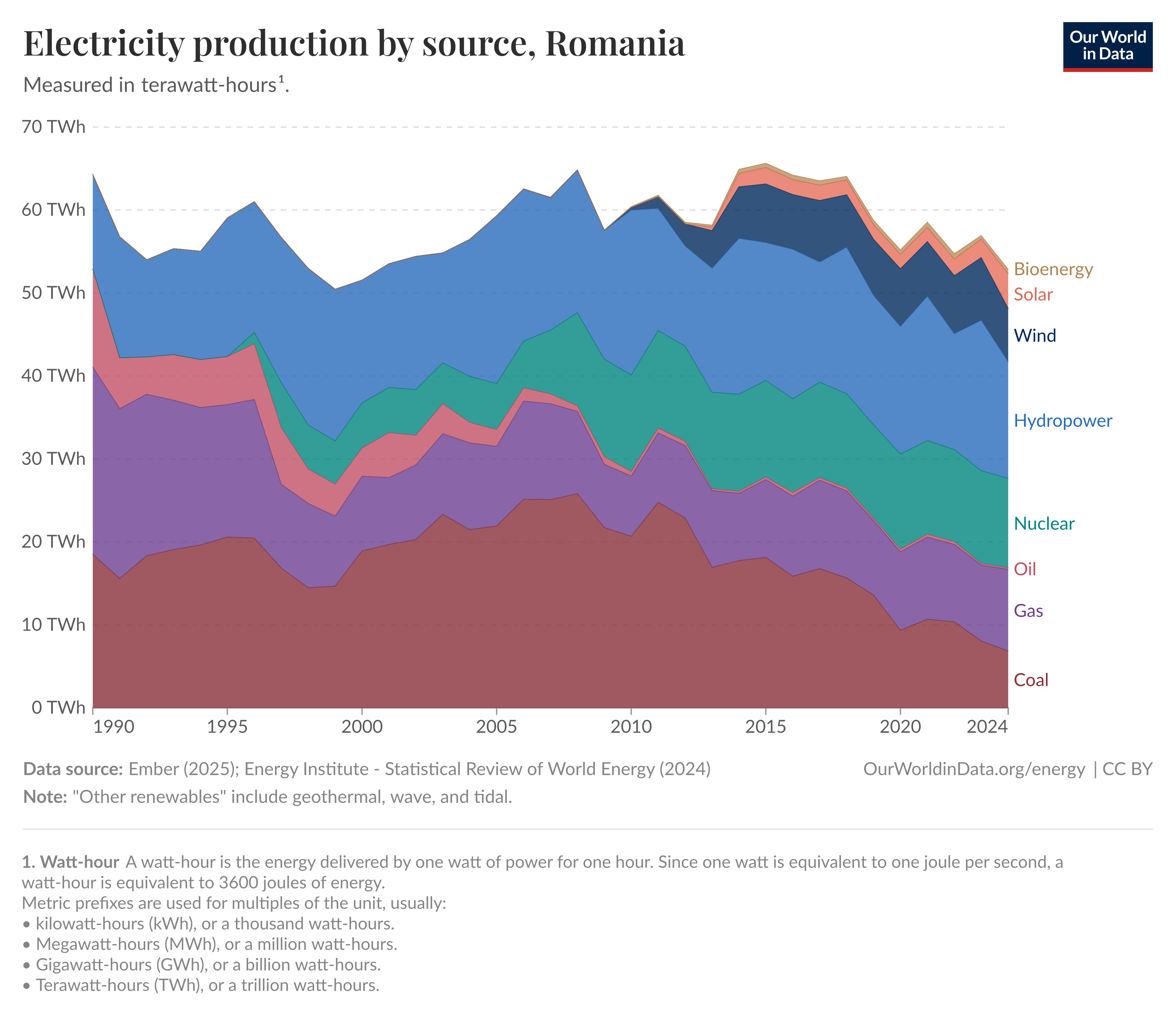
Electricity generation in Romania by source

The EU Just Transition Fund is targeting coal-reliant countries, and Romania is hoping to receive €4.4 billion of the €17.5 billion fund to support the transition to clean energy in 2024–30. In 2022 coal still represented 18.38% of electrical production.

== Hydroelectric power ==
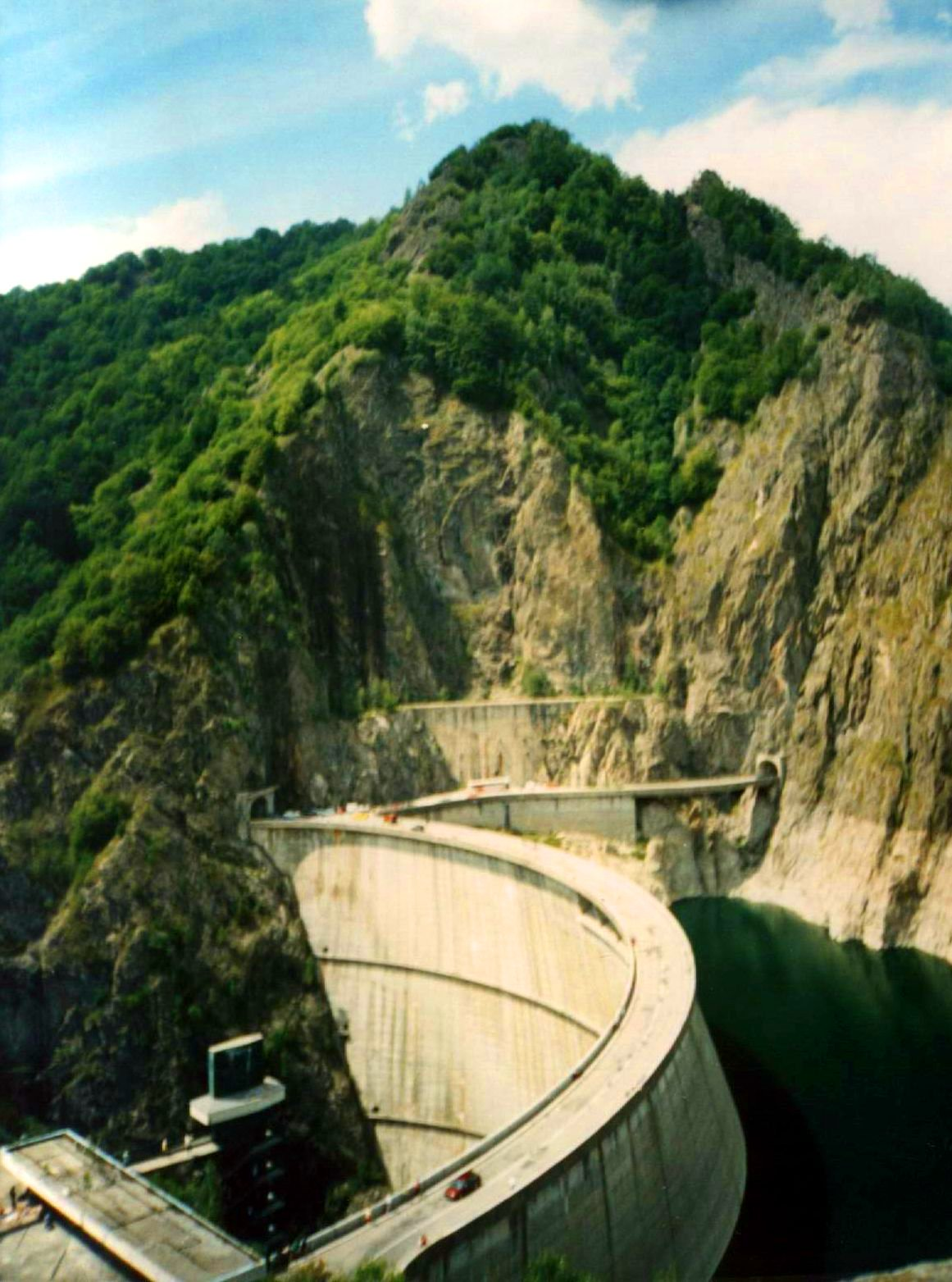
Vidraru Dam, where the largest hydroelectric power plant is located

Hidroelectrica run Hydroelectric power plants in Romania.

Romania has an estimated total usable hydropower of 36 TWh per year.

== Wind power ==
Installed capacity of 3,028 MW as of the end of 2016, up from the 14 MW installed capacity in 2009.

By 2021 this had risen to 17% of total installed power generation capacity and 13% of total power generation.

== Solar power ==
A small source in Romania, 1.772.2 TWh was generated, representing just 1.76% of 2022 electrical production.

It is intended to increase solar from 1.3 GW to 5 GW by 2030.

== Nuclear power ==
Romania placed a heavy emphasis on nuclear power generation. The country's first nuclear power plant, the Cernavodă Number One located near Cernavodă, opened in 1993. Two reactors (700 MW each) were operational in 2007, when atomic power generation was an estimated 10 million kilowatts, or 23.1 percent of total electric power.

To cover the increasing energy needs of its population and ensure the continued raising of its living standard, Romania plans several nuclear power plants. Nuclear power proposals were presented as early as the 1990s, but plans were repeatedly canceled even after bids were made by interested manufacturers because of high costs and safety concerns.

Besides the nuclear power plant in Cernavodă, which consists of two nuclear reactors, the Government has recently announced that it plans to build another nuclear power plant which would most likely be located near one of the major rivers in Transylvania. The new nuclear power plant would consist of two nuclear reactors and would have a total output of 1,413 MW. It was under construction in 2022.

Romania has always chosen CANDU nuclear reactors because they use natural unenriched uranium, which is cheap and available locally, and because they can be refueled online.
