= Electricity sector in Egypt =

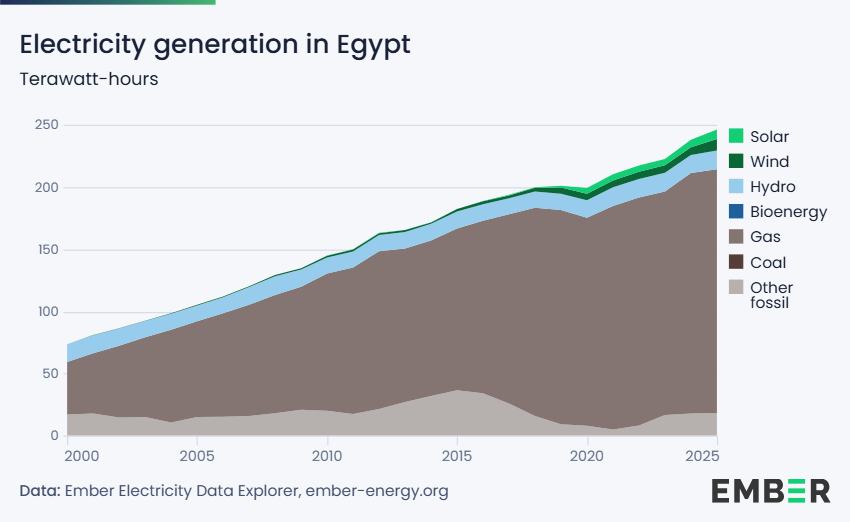
Electricity generation in Egypt in terawatt-hours

The electricity sector in Egypt has evolved from full state control to a diversified energy mix that integrates natural gas, renewables, and nuclear power, with growing regional interconnection and private sector involvement shaping its future.

The country's electricity generation remains predominantly dependent on fossil fuels, which accounted for 88% of the country's electricity mix in 2023. Despite this reliance, Egypt's per capita carbon emissions remain below the global average.

Wind and solar energy have been expanding, reaching 7% of Egypt's electricity generation in 2025, a significant increase from 1% in 2015. However, this remains below the global average of 13%. The secondary source of clean electricity in Egypt is hydropower, contributing 6% to the total generation.

Egypt is the largest producer of fossil gas-generated electricity in Africa, accounting for 45% of the continent’s gas-fired electricity in 2022. Over the past two decades, Egypt’s electricity demand has more than doubled, leading to a parallel increase in emissions. The rising demand has been primarily met by natural gas, which comprised 84% of Egypt’s electricity mix in 2023.

As part of its long-term energy strategy, Egypt aims to generate 42% of its electricity from renewable sources by 2030. However, the International Energy Agency's (IEA) Net Zero Emissions scenario suggests a global target of 60% renewable electricity by the same year.

As of 2016, 100% of the Egyptian population have access to electricity.

== History ==
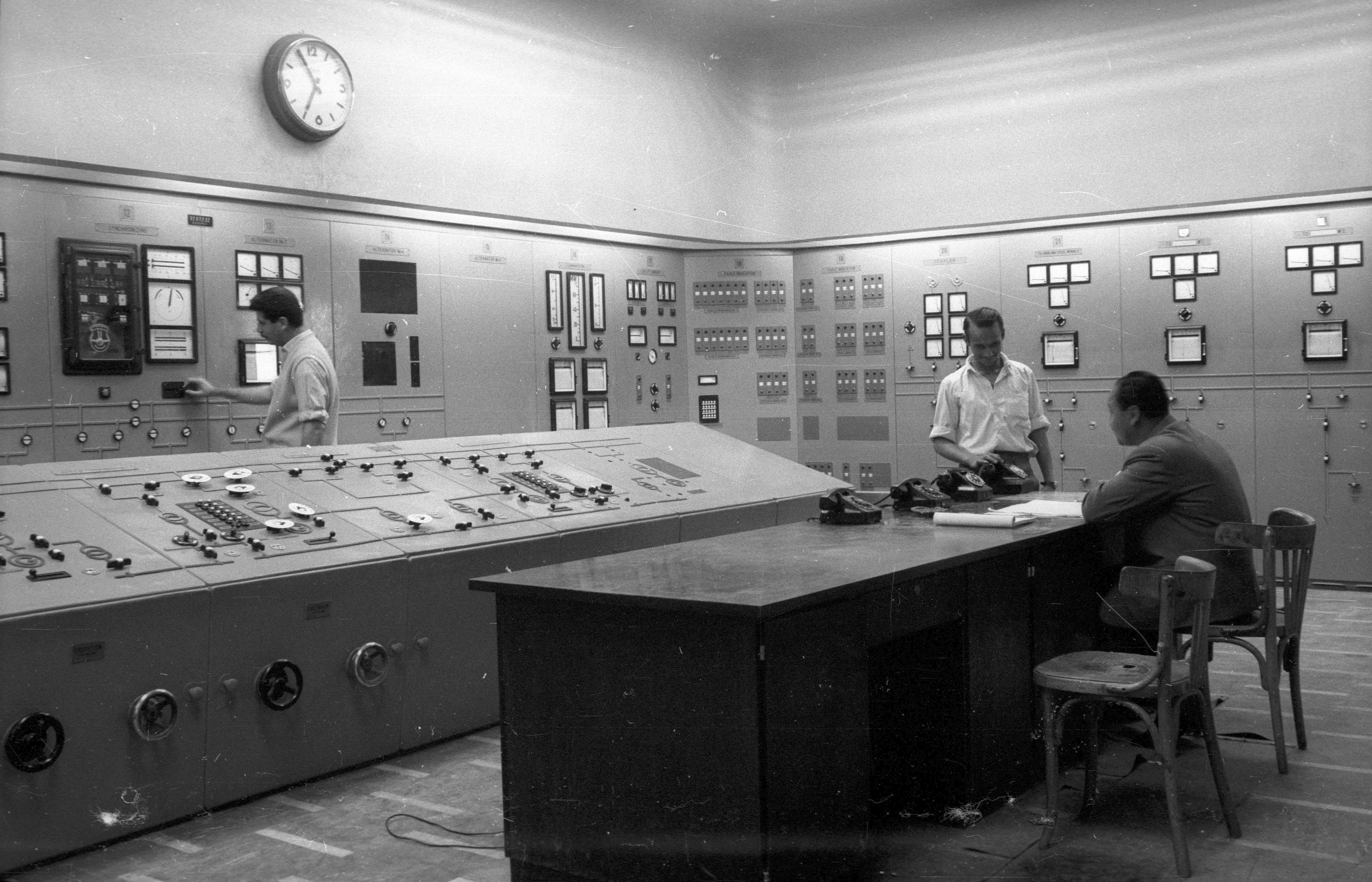
El Tebbin Power Station in Cairo, 1962

Egypt's electricity sector has undergone significant transformations since the introduction of electricity in 1893. Initially, power generation and distribution were controlled by private companies. However, in 1962, the government nationalized the industry, establishing three state-controlled authorities: the Electricity Production Authority, the Electricity Distribution Authority, and the Electricity Projects Implementation Authority. These entities were merged into the Egyptian Corporation for Electricity in 1965, later reorganized as the Egypt Electricity Authority in 1976 under Law No. 12. By 1978, seven regional electricity distribution companies were established, and in 1983, a supervisory authority was created to regulate them.

From 1996 to 2000, the Egyptian government introduced reforms to liberalize the electricity sector. Law No. 100 of 1996 allowed domestic and foreign investors to construct and operate power plants. The Electric Utility and Consumer Protection Regulatory Agency was founded in 1997 under Presidential Decree No. 326, tasked with regulating and supervising the industry. Additional restructuring took place in 2000, when Law No. 164 converted the Egyptian Electricity Authority into the Egyptian Electric Holding Company (EEHC), marking the transition towards a more corporatized system. By 2001, Egypt’s electricity sector was divided into generation, transmission, and distribution, leading to the establishment of 13 companies under EEHC. Subsequent reorganizations in 2002 and 2004 expanded this number to 16 companies, including seven electricity distribution companies, six production companies, and the Egyptian Electricity Transmission Company.

By 2014, Egypt faced an electricity crisis, with daily power outages lasting up to six hours. The government responded by cutting energy subsidies and accelerating gas field developments, particularly the Zohr gas field, discovered in 2015. These measures led to a surplus of electricity and enabled Egypt to set ambitious targets for renewable energy, aiming for 20% of total electricity from renewables by 2022 and 55% by 2050.

== Hydropower ==
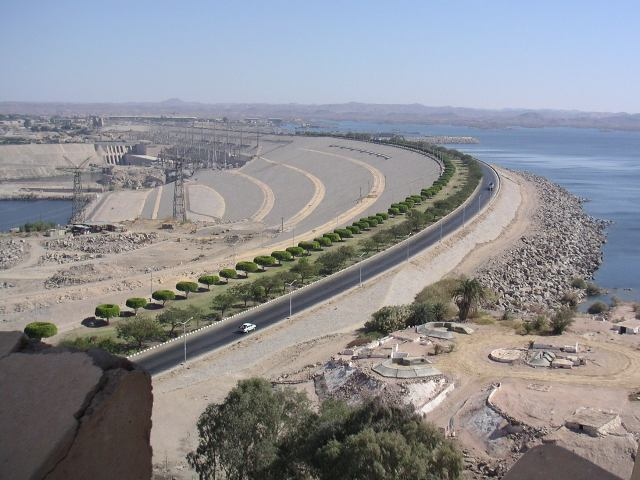
The Aswan High Dam provides Hydro power for Egypt

The country’s four main hydroelectric plants are the Aswan Low Dam, Esna Dam, Aswan High Dam, and Naga Hamady Barrages, with the Asyut Barrage hydropower plant added in 2016. The Aswan High Dam accounts for nearly all of Egypt’s hydroelectric output, with a 2.1 GW theoretical capacity, though low water levels often prevent full operation. A refurbishment program is underway to boost capacity to 2.4 GW and extend turbine life by 40 years.

In 2011, Egypt generated 156.6 TWh, with 12.9 TWh from hydropower. Hydropower constituted 12% of total installed capacity between 2009 and 2013, down from 12.8% in 2006–2007, reflecting limited expansion potential as all major hydropower sites have already been developed. Despite population growth driving rising energy demand, Egypt has been unable to significantly expand its hydropower infrastructure. The Qattara Depression Project remains the only undeveloped large-scale hydropower site, with potential capacity between 670 MW and 6,800 MW, though its high costs and technical challenges have prevented implementation.

== Solar power ==
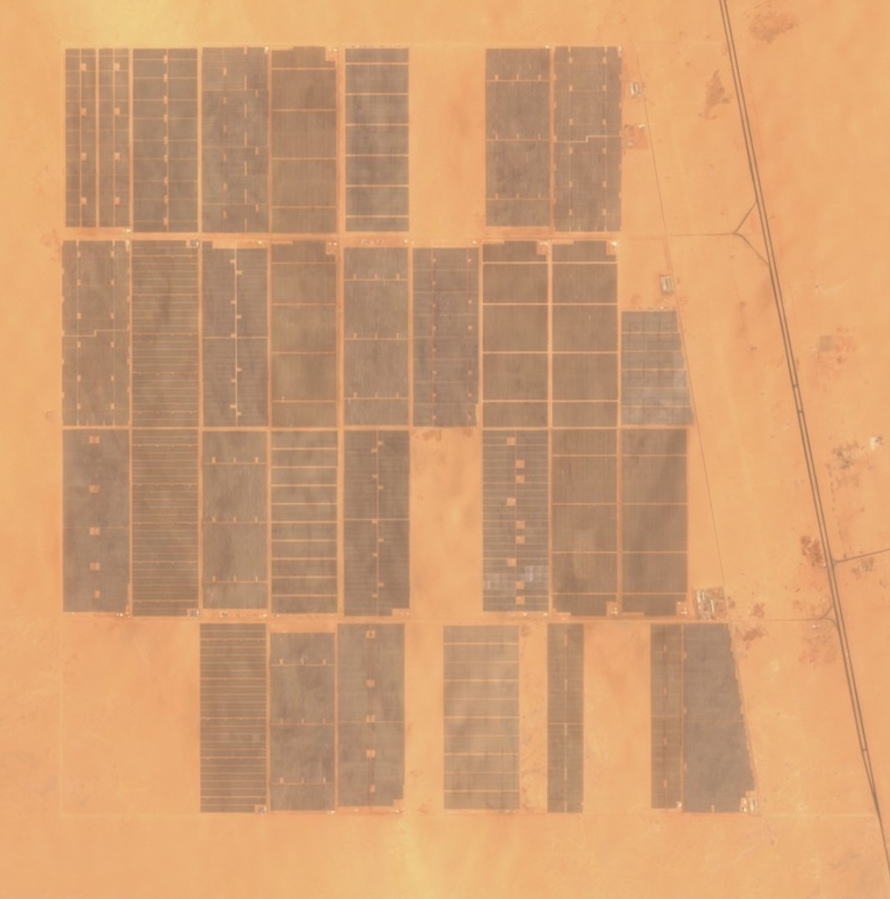
Benban Solar Park

Egypt benefits from high solar availability due to its hot desert climate, with some areas receiving over 4,000 hours of sunshine annually, among the highest in the world.

Egypt has pursued large-scale solar initiatives to meet growing energy demand and mitigate summer blackouts. In 2019, it completed Benban Solar Park, one of the world’s largest solar installations, generating 1.8 GW, enough to power 1 million homes. In 2021, Egypt signed $700 million in contracts for the Kom Ombo Solar Energy Complex, which includes 32 solar projects and is expected to create 10,000 jobs. A 300 MWh grid battery is being integrated at the site.

In 2024, Egypt launched a new $20.6 million initiative to construct two solar power stations, funded by a European Union grant. The projects, located at the Assiut Oil Refining Company (10 MW) and the Egyptian General Petroleum Corporation (6.5 MW), align with Egypt’s goal of generating 42% of its electricity from renewables by 2030. The country’s high solar irradiation and vast desert areas position it as a potential renewable energy hub in North Africa and the Middle East.

== Wind power ==
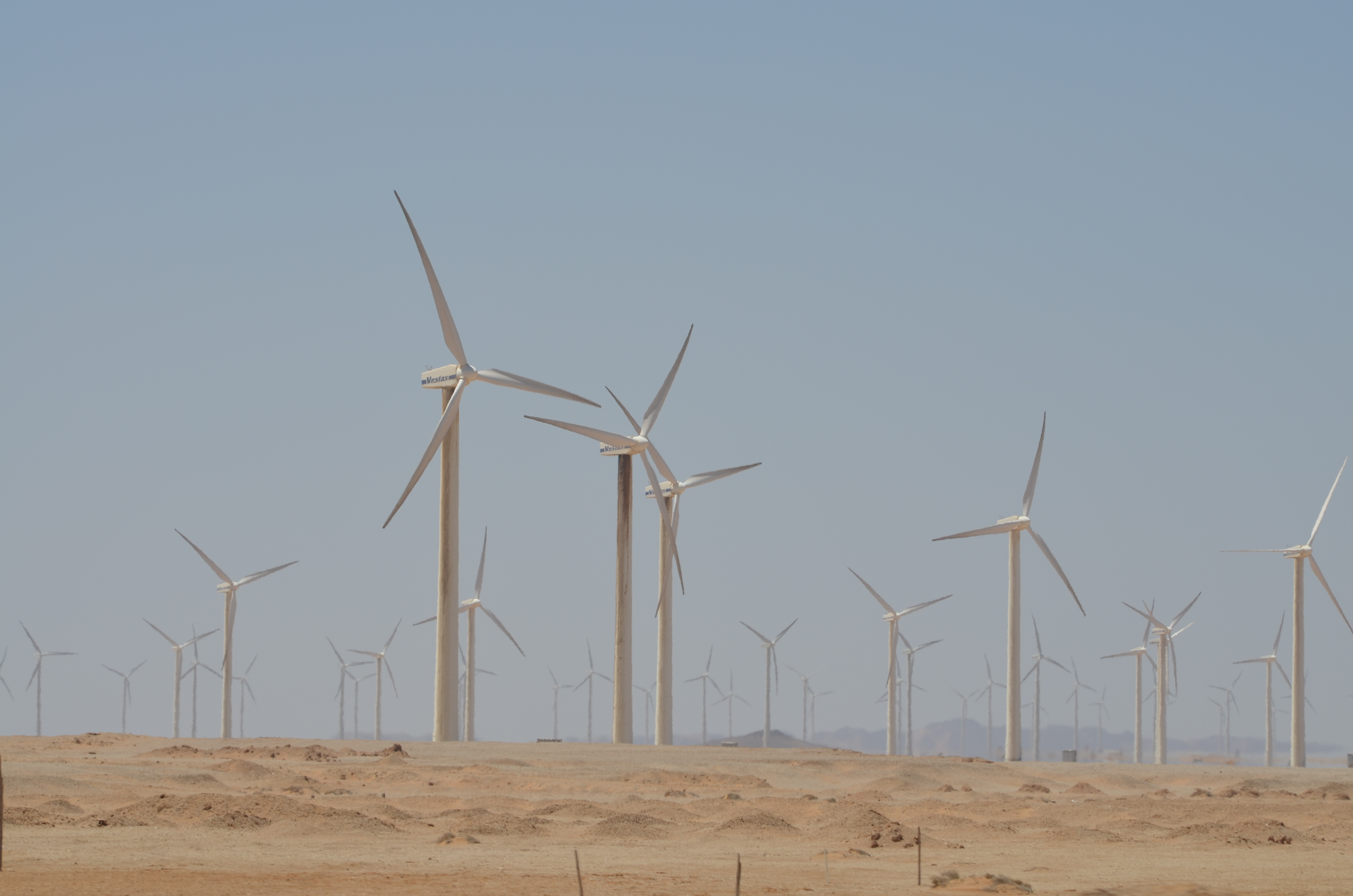
Wind farm at Zaafarana

Egypt possesses significant wind energy potential, particularly along the Red Sea coast. As of 2021, the country had an installed wind power capacity of 1,640 MW. By the end of 2022, Egypt ranked third in Africa with 1,702 MW, following South Africa (3,442 MW) and Morocco (1,788 MW). While 237 MW of new capacity was installed in 2021, no additional capacity was added in 2022.

One of Egypt's largest wind energy projects is the Gabal El Zeit wind farm, a €340 million facility covering 100 square kilometers with 300 turbines, generating 580 MW of electricity.

== Nuclear power ==
Egypt's nuclear energy ambitions date back to the 1960s, with proposals for a 150 MWe nuclear power station in 1964 and a 600 MWe plant in 1974. The Nuclear Power Plants Authority (NPPA) was established in 1976, and by 1983, the El Dabaa site on the Mediterranean coast was selected for Egypt's first nuclear facility. However, following the Chernobyl accident, Egypt shelved its nuclear plans.

In 2006, the Egyptian government announced a revival of its civilian nuclear program, planning to construct a 1,000 MW nuclear power plant at El Dabaa at an estimated cost of $1.5 billion, seeking foreign investment for construction. This was followed by an Egypt-Russia agreement in 2008 on the peaceful uses of nuclear energy. However, nuclear expansion stalled until 2015, when Egypt signed contracts with Russia’s Rosatom to build the El Dabaa Nuclear Power Plant.

A significant milestone came in December 2017, when preliminary contracts were signed for the construction of four VVER-1200 reactors in the presence of Egyptian President Abdel Fattah el-Sisi and Russian President Vladimir Putin. The Egyptian Nuclear and Radiological Regulatory Authority (ENRRA) granted the construction permit for Unit 1 in June 2022, followed by the pouring of the first safety-related concrete in July 2022. In October 2022, ENRRA approved Unit 2, with construction beginning in November 2022.

By April 2023, Egyptian and Russian officials accelerated construction to compensate for delays caused by the COVID-19 pandemic and the Russian invasion of Ukraine. The plant, located 135 kilometers west of Alexandria, is expected to be completed by 2030.

== Interconnection projects ==
Egypt is working with Cyprus and Greece on the proposed EuroAfrica Interconnector project, a 2 GW high-voltage direct current undersea cable that will link Egypt with Europe. This project aims to integrate Egypt into the European power grid and position it as a regional electricity hub. The interconnector has received full support from the leaders of Egypt, Cyprus, and Greece, who emphasized its strategic importance for regional energy security during a trilateral summit in 2017.

== See also ==
- Energy in Egypt
- Renewable energy in Egypt
- List of power stations in Egypt
