= List of countries by carbon dioxide emissions per capita =

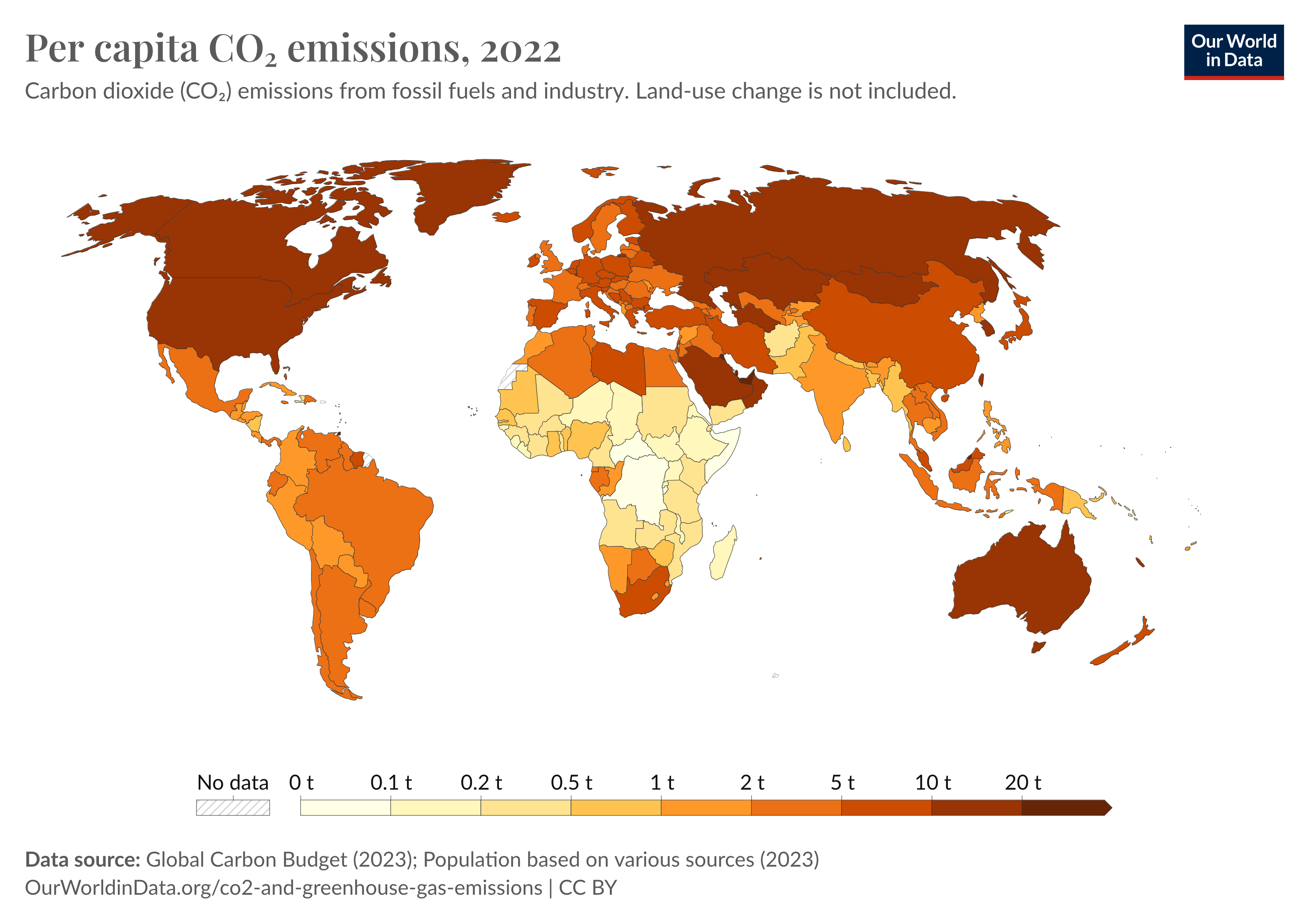
Global map of per capita carbon dioxide (CO_{2}) emissions from fossil fuels and industry, 2022. Land use change is not included.

Per capita carbon dioxide emissions show countertrends over time among the top six emitters.

This is a list of sovereign states and territories by per capita carbon dioxide emissions (Note: Carbon dioxide (CO_{2}) is a colourless, odourless and non-poisonous gas formed by combustion of carbon and in the respiration of living organisms and is considered a greenhouse gas. Emissions means the release of greenhouse gases and/or their precursors into the atmosphere over a specified area and period of time. Carbon dioxide emissions or CO_{2} emissions are emissions stemming from the burning of fossil fuels and the manufacture of cement; they include carbon dioxide produced during consumption of solid, liquid, and gas fuels as well as gas flaring) due to certain forms of human activity, based on the EDGAR database created by European Commission. The following table lists the annual per capita CO_{2} emissions estimates (in kilotons of CO_{2} per year) for the year 2023, as well as the change from the year 2000.

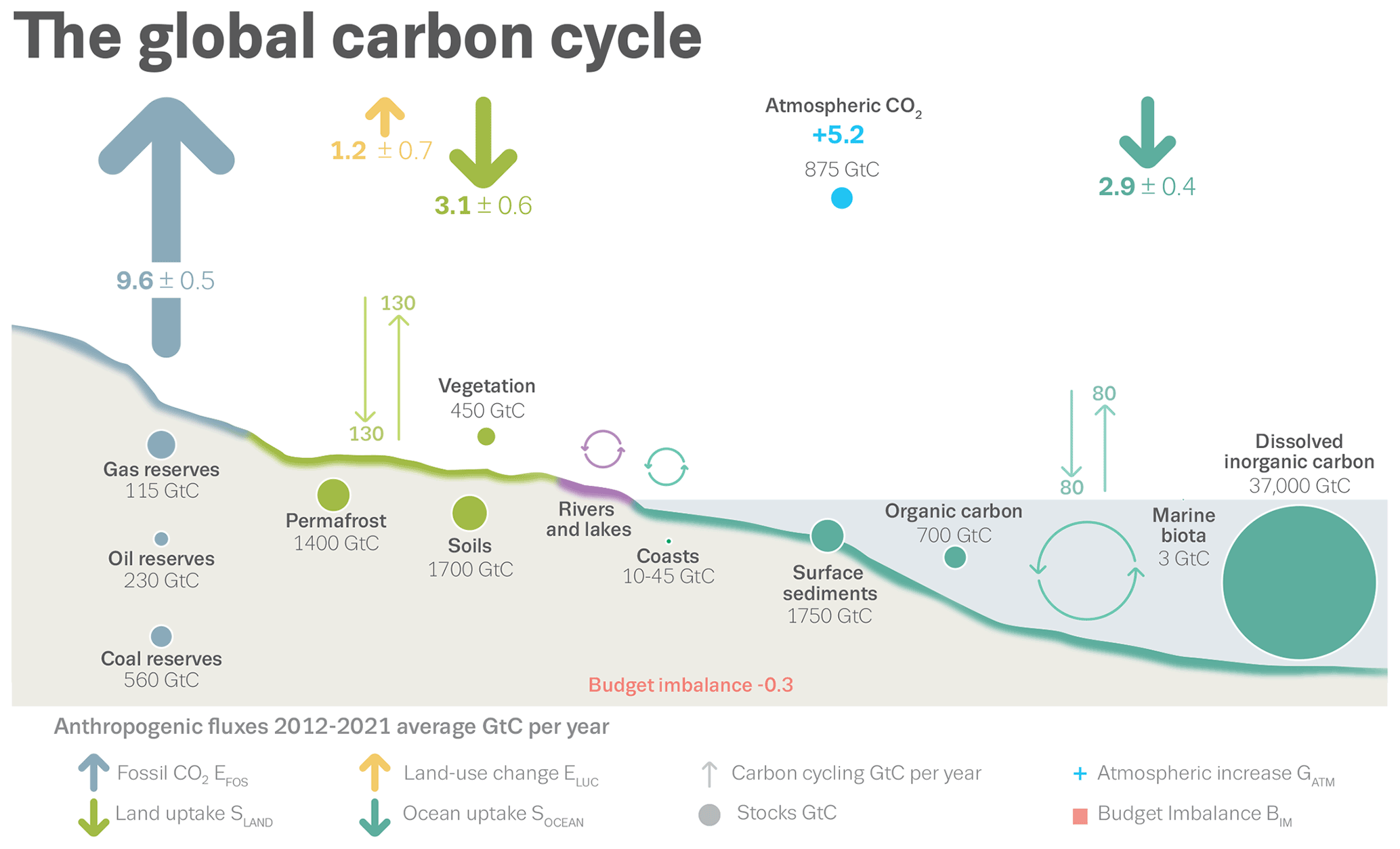
The data only considers carbon dioxide emissions from the burning of fossil fuels and cement manufacture, but not emissions from land use, land-use change and forestry (Note: Global Carbon Project (2022) The rate of build-up of carbon dioxide (CO_{2}) in the atmosphere can be reduced by taking advantage of the fact that atmospheric CO_{2} can accumulate as carbon in vegetation and soils in terrestrial ecosystems. Under the United Nations Framework Convention on Climate Change any process, activity or mechanism which removes a greenhouse gas (GHG) from the atmosphere is referred to as a "sink". Human activities impact terrestrial sinks, through land use, land-use change and forestry (LULUCF), consequently, the exchange of CO_{2} (carbon cycle) between the terrestrial biosphere and the atmosphere is altered.) Over the last 150 years, estimated cumulative emissions from land use and land-use change represent approximately one-third of total cumulative anthropogenic CO_{2} emissions. Emissions from international shipping or bunker fuels are also not included in national figures, which can make a large difference for small countries with important ports.

Measures of territorial-based emissions, also known as production-based emissions, do not account for emissions embedded in global trade, where emissions may be imported or exported in the form of traded goods, as it only reports emissions emitted within geographical boundaries. Accordingly, a proportion of the CO_{2} produced and reported in Asia and Africa is for the production of goods consumed in Europe and North America.

According to the review of the scientific literature conducted by the Intergovernmental Panel on Climate Change (IPCC), carbon dioxide is the most important anthropogenic greenhouse gas by warming contribution. The other major anthropogenic greenhouse gases (Note: Greenhouse gases (GHG) constitute a group of gases contributing to global warming and climate change. The Kyoto Protocol, an environmental agreement adopted by many of the parties to the United Nations Framework Convention on Climate Change (UNFCCC) in 1997 to curb global warming, nowadays covers seven greenhouse gases: the non-fluorinated gases: carbon dioxide (CO_{2}), methane (CH_{4}), nitrous oxide (N_{2}O), the fluorinated gases: hydrofluorocarbons (HFCs), perfluorocarbons (PFCs), sulphur hexafluoride (SF_{6}), nitrogen trifluoride (NF_{3}).; Converting them to carbon dioxide (or CO_{2}) equivalents makes it possible to compare them and to determine their individual and total contributions to global warming.)) are not included in the following list, nor are humans emissions of water vapor (H_{2}O), the most important greenhouse gases, as they are negligible compared to naturally occurring quantities.

According to Science for Policy report in 2024 by the Joint Research Centre (JRC – the European Commission's science and knowledge service) and International Energy Agency (IEA), in 2023, global GHG emissions primarily consisted of CO_{2}, resulting from the combustion of fossil fuels (73.7%).

== Per capita CO_{2} emissions by country/territory ==
The data in the following table is extracted from EDGAR - Emissions Database for Global Atmospheric Research.

List of countries by carbon emissions per capita
Location	% of global average	Emissions per capita (tons per year)		% change from 2000
Location	% of global average	2023	2000	% change from 2000
World	100%	4.86	4.19	▲ +16%
European Union	117%	5.66	8.32	▼ −32%
Palau (Note: Palau, which has only 22,000 inhabitants derives half its GDP from its 89,000 tourists and most of the transport and imported food are used by them.)	1288%	62.59	110.66	▼ −43%
Qatar	896%	43.55	53.61	▼ −19%
Kuwait	512%	24.90	26.56	▼ −6%
Brunei	435%	21.12	18.23	▲ +16%
New Caledonia	430%	20.90	10.22	▲ +105%
Bahrain	426%	20.70	26.74	▼ −23%
United Arab Emirates	416%	20.22	28.04	▼ −28%
Trinidad and Tobago	406%	19.71	15.09	▲ +31%
Gibraltar	405%	19.67	10.94	▲ +80%
Saudi Arabia	353%	17.15	12.77	▲ +34%
Oman	352%	17.11	11.60	▲ +47%
Canada	307%	14.91	17.67	▼ −16%
Curaçao	302%	14.66	42.90	▼ −66%
Russia	297%	14.45	11.48	▲ +26%
Australia	293%	14.21	18.56	▼ −23%
United States	285%	13.83	21.03	▼ −34%
Seychelles	263%	12.76	9.38	▲ +36%
Kazakhstan	256%	12.43	8.78	▲ +42%
Taiwan	240%	11.68	10.90	▲ +7%
Luxembourg	230%	11.18	20.18	▼ −45%
South Korea	227%	11.04	10.01	▲ +10%
Turkmenistan	216%	10.51	8.71	▲ +21%
Greenland	210%	10.21	0.02	▲+42,740%
Singapore	193%	9.38	11.63	▼ −19%
China	190%	9.24	2.86	▲ +223%
Iran	187%	9.10	5.35	▲ +70%
Libya	183%	8.88	9.20	▼ −3%
Estonia	183%	8.87	12.42	▼ −29%
Iceland	181%	8.79	10.18	▼ −14%
Czech Republic	175%	8.52	12.86	▼ −34%
Mongolia	174%	8.45	3.77	▲ +124%
Cook Islands	172%	8.37	3.36	▲ +149%
Malaysia	171%	8.30	5.64	▲ +47%
Norway	162%	7.86	9.28	▼ −15%
Poland	157%	7.63	8.12	▼ −6%
Japan	155%	7.54	9.79	▼ −23%
New Zealand	149%	7.22	8.52	▼ −15%
Belgium	148%	7.18	12.15	▼ −41%
Netherlands	146%	7.09	11.11	▼ −36%
Germany	145%	7.06	10.70	▼ −34%
Austria	137%	6.65	8.26	▼ −20%
South Africa	135%	6.56	7.59	▼ −14%
Ireland	134%	6.50	11.39	▼ −43%
Falkland Islands	133%	6.48	2.50	▲ +160%
Slovakia	132%	6.40	7.72	▼ −17%
Bosnia and Herzegovina	130%	6.33	3.79	▲ +67%
Maldives	124%	6.00	2.27	▲ +165%
Bulgaria	121%	5.86	6.02	▼ −3%
Bermuda	120%	5.84	2.35	▲ +149%
Cyprus	120%	5.83	7.56	▼ −23%
Slovenia	119%	5.81	7.56	▼ −23%
Belarus	119%	5.79	5.66	▲ +2%
Saint Pierre and Miquelon	118%	5.73	2.80	▲ +105%
Finland	118%	5.73	11.09	▼ −48%
Cayman Islands	112%	5.42	3.15	▲ +72%
Italy (including San Marino and Vatican City)	107%	5.19	7.94	▼ −35%
Turkey	106%	5.13	3.59	▲ +43%
Aruba	101%	4.91	2.96	▲ +66%
Greece	97%	4.69	8.62	▼ −46%
Spain (including Andorra)	96%	4.68	7.66	▼ −39%
Lithuania	96%	4.66	3.33	▲ +40%
Hungary	95%	4.61	5.82	▼ −21%
Denmark	94%	4.56	9.95	▼ −54%
Hong Kong	93%	4.51	6.29	▼ −28%
Chile	92%	4.45	3.53	▲ +26%
Suriname	92%	4.45	3.13	▲ +42%
Saint Helena, Ascension and Tristan da Cunha	91%	4.44	2.20	▲ +102%
Macao	91%	4.42	3.45	▲ +28%
United Kingdom	91%	4.42	9.36	▼ −53%
Croatia	89%	4.31	4.38	▼ −1%
Iraq	88%	4.30	3.77	▲ +14%
French Polynesia	88%	4.27	3.03	▲ +41%
France (including Monaco)	88%	4.25	6.73	▼ −37%
North Macedonia	86%	4.19	4.44	▼ −6%
Azerbaijan	85%	4.14	3.54	▲ +17%
Israel	85%	4.13	6.42	▼ −36%
Guyana	85%	4.11	2.21	▲ +86%
Bahamas	83%	4.04	3.35	▲ +21%
Uzbekistan	82%	4.01	5.26	▼ −24%
Algeria	82%	3.99	2.82	▲ +42%
Thailand	81%	3.94	2.78	▲ +42%
Argentina	81%	3.93	3.69	▲ +7%
Switzerland (including Liechtenstein)	80%	3.87	6.25	▼ −38%
Malta	79%	3.85	5.38	▼ −28%
Puerto Rico	78%	3.80	6.63	▼ −43%
Romania	76%	3.70	4.40	▼ −16%
Vietnam	76%	3.69	0.70	▲ +424%
Portugal	74%	3.58	6.22	▼ −43%
Latvia	73%	3.56	3.03	▲ +17%
Mexico	72%	3.52	3.90	▼ −10%
Laos	72%	3.49	0.18	▲+1,892%
Sweden	71%	3.43	6.53	▼ −47%
Georgia	69%	3.33	1.10	▲ +202%
Mauritius	68%	3.29	2.06	▲ +60%
Panama	68%	3.29	1.71	▲ +92%
Ukraine	65%	3.17	7.37	▼ −57%
Lebanon	62%	3.00	4.73	▼ −37%
Antigua and Barbuda	62%	2.99	1.62	▲ +85%
Botswana	60%	2.93	2.37	▲ +23%
Martinique	58%	2.83	1.74	▲ +63%
Réunion	58%	2.81	2.78	▲ +1%
Barbados	57%	2.76	2.18	▲ +26%
Dominican Republic	56%	2.74	2.22	▲ +24%
Turks and Caicos Islands	56%	2.71	0.94	▲ +189%
Armenia	54%	2.63	1.16	▲ +126%
Guadeloupe	54%	2.61	1.45	▲ +79%
Tunisia	53%	2.57	2.18	▲ +18%
Ecuador	52%	2.51	1.75	▲ +44%
Uruguay	51%	2.50	1.68	▲ +49%
Moldova	51%	2.50	1.64	▲ +52%
Venezuela	51%	2.47	5.62	▼ −56%
North Korea	51%	2.46	3.22	▼ −24%
Equatorial Guinea	50%	2.44	4.47	▼ −45%
Indonesia	50%	2.41	1.41	▲ +70%
Fiji	48%	2.35	1.80	▲ +30%
Jamaica	48%	2.34	3.84	▼ −39%
Bhutan	47%	2.31	0.71	▲ +225%
Egypt	47%	2.31	1.83	▲ +26%
Samoa	47%	2.30	1.08	▲ +113%
Jordan	46%	2.25	3.23	▼ −30%
British Virgin Islands	46%	2.21	1.34	▲ +65%
Brazil	45%	2.20	1.99	▲ +10%
Gabon	44%	2.16	5.36	▼ −60%
India	43%	2.07	0.95	▲ +119%
Saint Kitts and Nevis	42%	2.05	1.09	▲ +88%
Bolivia	41%	1.98	0.98	▲ +101%
Colombia	41%	1.97	1.55	▲ +27%
Tonga	40%	1.95	1.03	▲ +89%
Cuba	39%	1.92	2.60	▼ −26%
Morocco	38%	1.82	1.16	▲ +57%
Cape Verde	35%	1.71	0.65	▲ +164%
Peru	35%	1.70	1.12	▲ +52%
Costa Rica	34%	1.66	1.30	▲ +27%
Saint Lucia	33%	1.62	0.61	▲ +164%
Kyrgyzstan	33%	1.60	0.98	▲ +64%
Albania	32%	1.56	1.04	▲ +50%
Namibia	31%	1.53	1.03	▲ +49%
Anguilla	30%	1.43	1.40	▲ +2%
Philippines	29%	1.41	0.95	▲ +48%
Grenada	26%	1.29	0.56	▲ +128%
El Salvador	26%	1.27	0.99	▲ +29%
Syria	25%	1.19	2.80	▼ −57%
Congo	24%	1.18	1.40	▼ −16%
French Guiana	24%	1.17	1.07	▲ +10%
Guatemala	23%	1.13	0.83	▲ +36%
Paraguay	23%	1.13	0.69	▲ +64%
Honduras	22%	1.08	0.77	▲ +41%
Dominica	22%	1.05	0.80	▲ +32%
Cambodia	21%	1.03	0.16	▲ +528%
Sri Lanka	20%	0.97	0.61	▲ +58%
Tajikistan	19%	0.93	0.45	▲ +108%
Eswatini	19%	0.92	1.03	▼ −11%
Vanuatu	19%	0.92	0.46	▲ +101%
São Tomé and Príncipe	19%	0.92	0.40	▲ +131%
Pakistan	19%	0.91	0.81	▲ +13%
Mauritania	19%	0.90	0.39	▲ +129%
Saint Vincent and the Grenadines	18%	0.87	0.39	▲ +125%
Nicaragua	18%	0.87	0.75	▲ +16%
Angola	16%	0.78	1.00	▼ −22%
Kiribati	16%	0.76	0.39	▲ +96%
Ghana	15%	0.74	0.32	▲ +130%
Djibouti	15%	0.72	1.03	▼ −30%
Bangladesh	15%	0.71	0.20	▲ +248%
Belize	14%	0.66	0.56	▲ +18%
Senegal	13%	0.65	0.40	▲ +60%
Papua New Guinea	13%	0.64	0.53	▲ +21%
Zimbabwe	13%	0.62	1.19	▼ −48%
Solomon Islands	13%	0.61	0.57	▲ +7%
Myanmar	12%	0.59	0.22	▲ +173%
Nigeria	12%	0.58	0.82	▼ −30%
Nepal	12%	0.57	0.14	▲ +299%
Ivory Coast	11%	0.51	0.42	▲ +22%
Benin	10%	0.49	0.23	▲ +118%
East Timor	10%	0.48	0.26	▲ +82%
Western Sahara	9%	0.41	0.81	▼ −49%
Zambia	8%	0.40	0.19	▲ +113%
Cameroon	8%	0.38	0.37	▲ +3%
Kenya	8%	0.38	0.28	▲ +34%
Lesotho	8%	0.36	0.19	▲ +93%
Comoros	7%	0.34	0.17	▲ +105%
Sudan South Sudan	7%	0.34	0.18	▲ +91%
Yemen	7%	0.34	0.88	▼ −62%
Haiti	6%	0.30	0.20	▲ +52%
Mali	6%	0.30	0.07	▲ +311%
Liberia	6%	0.30	0.14	▲ +113%
Malawi	6%	0.29	0.27	▲ +7%
Tanzania	6%	0.28	0.09	▲ +210%
Mozambique	6%	0.28	0.09	▲ +219%
Togo	6%	0.28	0.25	▲ +10%
Burkina Faso	5%	0.26	0.08	▲ +249%
Guinea	5%	0.25	0.17	▲ +50%
Gambia	5%	0.24	0.22	▲ +11%
Afghanistan	4%	0.21	0.05	▲ +324%
Guinea-Bissau	3%	0.16	0.16	▼ −1%
Chad	3%	0.14	0.03	▲ +399%
Uganda	3%	0.14	0.06	▲ +137%
Ethiopia	3%	0.14	0.06	▲ +138%
Madagascar	3%	0.14	0.11	▲ +27%
Sierra Leone	3%	0.13	0.10	▲ +32%
Rwanda	2%	0.12	0.08	▲ +39%
Eritrea	2%	0.12	0.20	▼ −42%
Niger	2%	0.10	0.06	▲ +69%
Central African Republic	1%	0.07	0.07	▲ +2%
Burundi	1%	0.06	0.05	▲ +41%
Somalia	1%	0.05	0.07	▼ −30%
Faroe Islands	1%	0.04	0.04	▲ +11%
Democratic Republic of the Congo	1%	0.04	0.04	▼ −3%

== CO_{2} emissions per capita embedded in global trade ==
CO_{2} emissions are typically measured on the basis of ‘production’. This accounting method – which is sometimes referred to as ‘territorial’ emissions – is used when countries report their emissions, and set targets domestically and internationally. In addition to the commonly reported production-based emissions statisticians also calculate ‘consumption-based’ emissions. These emissions are adjusted for trade. To calculate consumption-based emissions, traded goods are tracked across the world, and whenever a good was imported all CO_{2} emissions that were emitted in the production of that good are also imported, and vice versa to subtract all CO_{2} emissions that were emitted in the production of goods that were exported.

Consumption-based emissions reflect the consumption and lifestyle choices of a country's citizens. They are national or regional emissions that have been adjusted for trade, calculated as domestic (or ‘production-based’) emissions minus the emissions generated in the production of goods and services that are exported to other countries or regions, plus emissions from the production of goods and services that are imported.

Consumption-based emissions = Production-based – Exported + Imported emissions

Consumption-based emission is therefore measured as the production-based emissions adjusted by the net import-export balance in tons of CO_{2} per year. Positive values of net import represent net importers of CO_{2}; net importer countries have higher consumption-based emissions than what production-based methods would measure. Converserly, for net exporters of CO_{2} (countries with negative values of import-export balance), consumptions-based emissions measure lower emissions than production-based methods.

The data in the following table is extracted from Our World in Data database. Sorting is alphabetical by country code, according to ISO 3166-1 alpha-3.

Country / territory	Production vs. consumption-based CO_{2} emissions per capita (t_{CO_{2}}/cap)										CO_{2} emissions embedded in global trade (t_{CO_{2}}/cap)		
Country / territory	1990		2005		2017		2020		2021		2020		
Country / territory	P	C	P	C	P	C	P	C	P	C	C-P	(C-P)/P (%)	Net
Aruba	7.413		28.771		8.443		7.307		8.054				
Afghanistan	0.189		0.077		0.277		0.300		0.296				
Angola	0.430		0.977		0.805		0.607		0.619				
Anguilla	6.151		10.556		9.501		8.416		9.173				
Albania	1.675	1.686	1.405	1.923	1.932	2.138	1.649	2.015	1.618		0.365	22.14%	importer
Andorra	7.589		7.205		6.301		5.775		5.729				
United Arab Emirates	27.210	29.460	26.741	33.573	23.616	23.982	21.436	19.848	21.792		−1.588	−7.41%	exporter
Argentina	3.434	3.433	4.132	3.596	4.242	4.337	3.758	3.535	4.118		−0.223	−5.95%	exporter
Armenia	2.515	1.683	1.436	1.915	1.943	2.031	2.292	2.587	2.439		0.295	12.86%	importer
Antigua and Barbuda	3.470		4.679		5.387		4.591		5.027				
Australia	16.316	14.264	19.143	17.051	16.850	15.369	15.579	13.811	15.091		−1.768	−11.35%	exporter
Austria	8.093	11.630	9.612	12.980	7.911	10.458	6.964	9.118	7.243		2.154	30.93%	importer
Azerbaijan	6.910	3.758	3.961	4.091	3.436	3.412	3.647	3.806	3.732		0.159	4.35%	importer
Burundi	0.038		0.021		0.048		0.054		0.055				
Belgium	12.078	15.543	11.946	21.497	8.707	17.642	7.816	15.392	8.244		7.576	96.93%	importer
Benin	0.113	0.181	0.306	0.460	0.587	0.663	0.575	0.654	0.597		0.080	13.84%	importer
Caribbean Netherlands	5.468		4.358		4.206		3.585		3.868				
Burkina Faso	0.064	0.088	0.081	0.123	0.228	0.263	0.250	0.282	0.258		0.032	12.64%	importer
Bangladesh	0.131	0.170	0.267	0.274	0.499	0.749	0.542	0.807	0.550		0.264	48.74%	importer
Bulgaria	8.748	6.999	6.482	6.215	6.623	5.744	5.297	5.229	6.181		−0.067	−1.27%	exporter
Bahrain	23.976	22.449	21.957	8.693	22.539	13.110	25.451	14.775	26.664		−10.676	−41.95%	exporter
Bahamas	7.472		5.478		5.252		5.330		5.850				
Bosnia and Herzegovina	4.319		3.919		6.441		6.308		4.148				
Belarus	10.389	5.880	5.970	4.328	6.105	6.156	6.082	5.988	6.223		−0.094	−1.55%	exporter
Belize	1.706		1.503		1.643		1.556		1.723				
Bermuda	8.731		9.250		9.957		7.766		8.533				
Bolivia	1.410	1.285	1.191	1.066	2.053	2.066	1.765	1.832	1.931		0.067	3.78%	importer
Brazil	1.451	1.630	1.951	1.871	2.386	2.393	2.075	1.997	2.281		−0.077	−3.73%	exporter
Barbados	4.134		4.895		4.321		3.639		4.002				
Brunei	23.626	16.566	13.278	12.341	21.635	19.522	23.890	22.550	23.532		−1.341	−5.61%	exporter
Bhutan	0.230		0.571		1.639		1.941		1.958				
Botswana	2.013	2.013	2.162	1.393	2.947	4.964	2.458	4.702	2.511		2.244	91.32%	importer
Central African Republic	0.065		0.051		0.043		0.040		0.042				
Canada	16.568	17.464	17.838	18.904	15.635	14.518	14.117	12.950	14.300		−1.166	−8.26%	exporter
Switzerland	6.580	12.774	6.163	14.651	4.517	15.213	3.964	12.356	4.019		8.392	211.73%	importer
Chile	2.465	2.403	3.767	3.770	4.577	4.799	4.344	4.432	4.383		0.089	2.04%	importer
China	2.154	2.012	4.503	3.613	7.099	6.488	7.689	7.041	8.046		−0.648	−8.42%	exporter
Ivory Coast	0.401	0.499	0.395	0.404	0.483	0.615	0.409	0.549	0.426		0.140	34.31%	importer
Cameroon	0.228	0.263	0.208	0.348	0.393	0.462	0.340	0.376	0.342		0.036	10.47%	importer
Democratic Republic of the Congo	0.118		0.026		0.029		0.027		0.027				
Republic of the Congo	0.423		0.271		1.073		1.321		1.279				
Cook Islands	2.564		4.348		4.628		5.217		5.368				
Colombia	1.745	1.900	1.423	1.505	1.648	2.235	1.679	2.136	1.780		0.457	27.18%	importer
Comoros	0.153		0.241		0.351		0.350		0.363				
Cape Verde	0.492		0.907		1.025		1.073		1.136				
Costa Rica	0.922	1.636	1.558	2.205	1.642	2.498	1.382	2.195	1.517		0.813	58.83%	importer
Cuba	2.790		2.173		2.225		1.746		1.960				
Curaçao	30.768		34.321		26.784		8.841		9.686				
Cyprus	5.901	8.622	7.673	9.290	6.227	6.485	5.874	5.478	6.109		−0.397	−6.75%	exporter
Czech Republic	15.941	14.695	12.226	10.733	10.231	10.549	8.722	9.485	9.242		0.763	8.75%	importer
Germany	13.254	15.017	10.667	12.921	9.508	10.887	7.673	9.234	8.090		1.561	20.35%	importer
Djibouti	0.476		0.498		0.377		0.333		0.343				
Dominica	0.843		2.080		2.289		1.998		2.189				
Denmark	10.416	12.071	9.480	12.301	6.062	8.597	4.855	7.309	5.052		2.454	50.55%	importer
Dominican Republic	1.253	1.314	1.958	3.577	2.256	2.878	2.398	2.863	2.601		0.465	19.38%	importer
Algeria	3.007		3.231		4.045		3.970		3.990				
Ecuador	1.575	1.624	2.176	2.383	2.400	2.738	1.959	2.319	2.322		0.360	18.36%	importer
Egypt	1.315	1.431	2.087	1.865	2.555	2.506	2.194	2.248	2.285		0.054	2.46%	importer
Eritrea	0.000		0.272		0.207		0.220		0.227				
Spain	5.948	6.824	8.471	9.402	5.904	6.341	4.504	5.349	4.920		0.845	18.76%	importer
Estonia	23.507	19.982	12.630	14.286	14.240	12.798	7.028	9.385	7.864		2.357	33.54%	importer
Ethiopia	0.062	0.082	0.064	0.052	0.144	0.186	0.145	0.173	0.148		0.028	19.02%	importer
Finland	11.414	16.183	10.874	15.404	8.093	10.066	6.799	8.681	6.792		1.882	27.68%	importer
Fiji	1.027		1.173		1.423		1.554		1.590				
France	6.974	8.732	6.878	9.105	5.261	6.688	4.343	5.821	4.741		1.478	34.03%	importer
Faroe Islands	14.809		14.940		14.070		13.199		13.198				
Federated States of Micronesia			1.057		1.294		1.380		1.405				
Gabon	4.562		3.332		2.937		2.483		2.440				
United Kingdom	10.522	11.697	9.445	12.445	5.863	8.297	4.865	6.929	5.154		2.064	42.42%	importer
Georgia	2.958	1.825	1.267	2.216	2.697	3.002	2.839	3.472	2.930		0.633	22.30%	importer
Ghana	0.245	0.314	0.302	0.487	0.461	0.676	0.611	0.713	0.649		0.102	16.66%	importer
Guinea	0.158	0.158	0.200	0.189	0.265	0.425	0.343	0.435	0.358		0.092	26.70%	importer
Guadeloupe	3.408		5.929		6.262		5.791		5.785				
Gambia	0.190		0.194		0.249		0.238		0.248				
Guinea-Bissau	0.177		0.154		0.162		0.163		0.171				
Equatorial Guinea	0.134		9.296		5.420		3.126		3.197				
Greece	8.099	9.354	10.248	8.406	7.000	5.396	5.290	5.053	5.391		−0.237	−4.48%	exporter
Grenada	1.073		1.960		2.303		2.312		2.561				
Greenland	11.229		11.318		9.687		8.929		9.076				
Guatemala	0.547	0.748	0.922	0.774	1.045	0.924	1.013	1.235	1.154		0.221	21.84%	importer
French Guiana	6.321		2.965		2.624		2.239		2.190				
Guyana	1.510		2.132		3.039		4.003		3.838				
Hong Kong	4.650	14.767	6.304	12.722	5.687	11.508	4.200	10.771	4.225		6.571	156.44%	importer
Honduras	0.496	0.658	0.904	0.708	1.063	0.843	0.973	0.807	1.060		−0.165	−17.01%	exporter
Croatia	4.715	4.303	5.270	5.856	4.471	5.245	4.118	5.515	4.360		1.397	33.93%	importer
Haiti	0.144		0.189		0.285		0.232		0.251				
Hungary	7.057	8.837	5.984	7.761	5.058	6.718	4.849	6.235	4.990		1.386	28.58%	importer
Indonesia	0.795	0.767	1.525	1.437	2.145	2.163	2.243	2.296	2.262		0.053	2.37%	importer
India	0.664	0.661	1.026	0.949	1.798	1.690	1.751	1.631	1.925		−0.120	−6.88%	exporter
Ireland	9.452	11.350	11.685	17.619	8.189	10.420	7.107	8.815	7.528		1.708	24.03%	importer
Iran	3.763	3.627	6.599	5.638	8.111	7.023	8.363	7.543	8.517		−0.819	−9.80%	exporter
Iraq	2.778		3.929		5.343		4.077		4.263				
Iceland	8.689		9.994		10.481		9.078		9.113				
Israel	7.458	10.324	8.419	11.000	7.081	9.354	6.281	8.419	6.127		2.138	34.04%	importer
Italy	7.744	9.989	8.630	10.591	5.879	7.442	5.080	6.535	5.548		1.454	28.63%	importer
Jamaica	3.147	3.116	3.891	2.604	2.777	2.254	2.462	2.242	2.719		−0.220	−8.93%	exporter
Jordan	3.010	4.647	3.599	4.266	2.489	3.069	2.282	2.668	2.296		0.385	16.89%	importer
Japan	9.363	10.653	10.099	12.080	9.382	10.350	8.321	9.479	8.566		1.157	13.90%	importer
Kazakhstan	16.529	17.148	12.802	8.934	17.515	11.001	14.669	9.774	14.413		−4.895	−33.37%	exporter
Kenya	0.246	0.348	0.233	0.321	0.348	0.524	0.352	0.518	0.375		0.166	47.25%	importer
Kyrgyzstan	4.397	4.545	1.062	1.424	1.527	2.768	1.321	2.587	1.426		1.266	95.82%	importer
Cambodia	0.141	0.207	0.209	0.708	0.790	1.851	1.141	2.350	1.147		1.210	106.06%	importer
Kiribati	0.293		0.634		0.548		0.550		0.555				
Saint Kitts and Nevis	2.613		4.232		5.058		4.528		4.992				
South Korea	5.678	7.257	10.413	12.124	12.707	13.401	11.527	12.721	11.886		1.193	10.35%	importer
Kuwait	22.572	23.354	31.836	29.366	23.258	22.742	22.883	22.232	24.972		−0.651	−2.85%	exporter
Laos	0.119	0.186	0.228	0.395	2.813	3.036	2.799	3.041	2.798		0.241	8.62%	importer
Lebanon	2.189		3.586		4.558		4.322		4.463				
Liberia	0.211		0.199		0.256		0.222		0.230				
Libya	8.618		9.762		8.378		8.802		11.065				
Saint Lucia	1.262		2.348		2.854		2.461		2.705				
Liechtenstein	6.911		6.613		4.108		3.661		3.865				
Sri Lanka	0.223	0.367	0.607	1.035	1.071	1.725	0.999	1.694	0.954		0.694	69.46%	importer
Lesotho	0.819		1.017		1.158		0.971		1.000				
Lithuania	9.448	11.455	4.185	6.393	4.673	7.777	4.841	7.197	4.981		2.356	48.66%	importer
Luxembourg	31.010	31.010	26.003	31.018	15.531	16.291	12.843	12.643	13.068		−0.201	−1.56%	exporter
Latvia	7.311	8.032	3.497	6.008	3.691	7.364	3.687	7.348	3.878		3.661	99.30%	importer
Macau	2.950		3.742		3.018		1.881		1.874				
Morocco	0.907	1.240	1.468	1.543	1.730	1.841	1.764	1.803	1.904		0.039	2.20%	importer
Moldova	8.155		1.234		1.641		1.702		1.830				
Madagascar	0.078	0.117	0.092	0.155	0.157	0.216	0.142	0.193	0.147		0.051	36.13%	importer
Maldives	0.765		1.957		3.203		4.006		4.062				
Mexico	3.880	3.927	4.400	4.656	3.790	4.205	3.109	3.432	3.214		0.323	10.38%	importer
Marshall Islands			2.090		3.105		3.561		3.778				
North Macedonia	6.939		5.378		3.553		3.150		3.257				
Mali	0.047		0.110		0.184		0.185		0.190				
Malta	6.552	9.216	6.447	8.013	3.193	18.459	3.104	16.612	3.273		13.509	435.23%	importer
Myanmar	0.106		0.241		0.452		0.676		0.675				
Montenegro	3.082		2.766		3.325		3.897		2.789				
Mongolia	4.530	4.124	3.327	3.409	11.026	9.817	15.058	13.114	15.030		−1.944	−12.91%	exporter
Mozambique	0.074	0.300	0.088	0.285	0.243	0.455	0.214	0.420	0.223		0.206	96.29%	importer
Mauritania	0.426		0.477		0.822		0.857		0.892				
Montserrat	2.707		8.544		6.206		4.147		4.659				
Martinique	4.587		6.118		6.037		5.670		5.695				
Mauritius	1.341	2.493	2.618	3.573	3.503	4.511	3.243	4.496	3.443		1.254	38.66%	importer
Malawi	0.077	0.160	0.071	0.066	0.076	0.070	0.076	0.128	0.078		0.052	68.36%	importer
Malaysia	3.098	3.741	6.995	5.490	7.762	7.169	7.816	7.321	7.626		−0.495	−6.33%	exporter
Mayotte	0.723		1.204		1.092		0.894		0.865				
Namibia	0.000	0.000	1.178	1.150	1.783	4.111	1.585	3.654	1.587		2.069	130.53%	importer
New Caledonia	8.892		11.603		18.797		18.807		19.097				
Niger	0.072		0.051		0.104		0.102		0.107				
Nigeria	0.408	0.399	0.753	0.690	0.583	0.562	0.625	0.637	0.642		0.013	2.01%	importer
Nicaragua	0.483	0.635	0.783	0.944	0.843	1.121	0.675	0.869	0.739		0.195	28.90%	importer
Niue	2.863		1.948		3.875		5.910		6.092				
Netherlands	10.827	13.468	10.879	13.489	9.443	9.837	7.907	8.713	8.059		0.807	10.20%	importer
Norway	8.274		9.374	9.555	8.383	9.534	7.657	8.756	7.573		1.099	14.35%	importer
Nepal	0.037	0.059	0.114	0.175	0.413	0.387	0.475	0.849	0.472		0.374	78.75%	importer
Nauru	12.950		6.026		4.694		4.701		4.756				
New Zealand	7.507	7.910	9.055	10.103	7.519	8.088	6.808	7.665	6.587		0.857	12.58%	importer
Oman	6.219	6.948	11.716	9.996	15.108	15.260	15.959	12.929	17.917		−3.030	−18.98%	exporter
Kosovo					4.674		5.101		3.396				
Pakistan	0.588	0.626	0.772	0.840	0.999	1.111	0.926	1.006	0.992		0.080	8.59%	importer
Panama	1.074	1.197	2.109		2.740	4.391	2.714	3.706	2.995		0.991	36.53%	importer
Peru	0.968	1.079	1.312	1.336	1.700	1.986	1.426	1.730	1.669		0.304	21.32%	importer
Philippines	0.672	1.019	0.849	1.093	1.266	1.570	1.209	1.504	1.267		0.295	24.40%	importer
Palau	15.309		11.073		12.106		12.891		13.210				
Papua New Guinea	0.557		0.674		0.710		0.854		0.855				
Poland	9.899	8.469	8.384	7.514	8.765	8.289	7.898	7.471	8.577		−0.428	−5.42%	exporter
North Korea	5.691		3.112		2.028		2.139		2.171				
Portugal	4.529	5.185	6.625	12.234	5.356	5.673	4.059	4.655	3.965		0.596	14.68%	importer
Paraguay	0.526	0.931	0.690	1.055	1.270	1.896	1.214	1.843	1.279		0.629	51.82%	importer
Palestine	0.405		0.774		0.695		0.601		0.602				
French Polynesia	2.083		2.893		2.914		3.061		3.124				
Qatar	25.836	24.285	59.726	35.472	36.943	26.760	33.640	25.771	35.587		−7.869	−23.39%	exporter
Réunion	1.913		4.445		4.773		4.284		4.247				
Romania	7.596	7.047	4.753	4.721	4.063	4.350	3.813	4.171	4.104		0.358	9.39%	importer
Russia	17.127	13.795	10.842	8.317	11.372	9.583	11.154	9.341	12.099		−1.813	−16.26%	exporter
Rwanda	0.072	0.072	0.057	0.056	0.095	0.137	0.126	0.165	0.130		0.038	30.21%	importer
Saudi Arabia	13.027	12.100	16.225	14.379	18.824	18.508	18.368	18.278	18.703		−0.090	−0.49%	exporter
Sudan	0.226		0.339		0.551		0.451		0.461				
Senegal	0.417	0.452	0.505	0.609	0.710	0.895	0.775	0.938	0.806		0.162	20.93%	importer
Singapore	14.405	23.549	9.281	30.823	6.446	27.118	5.061	24.238	5.472		19.177	378.93%	importer
Saint Helena, Ascension and Tristan da Cunha	1.105		1.978		1.991		2.297		2.540				
Solomon Islands	0.452		0.585		0.444		0.448		0.449				
Sierra Leone	0.119		0.075		0.137		0.148		0.154				
El Salvador	0.461	0.766	1.043	1.367	0.953	1.252	1.033	1.356	1.141		0.323	31.30%	importer
Somalia	0.104		0.057		0.043		0.035		0.036				
Saint Pierre and Miquelon	14.437		10.153		11.029		9.496		10.505				
Serbia	7.067		6.594		6.099		6.055		4.230				
South Sudan	0.091		0.119		0.136		0.141		0.147				
São Tomé and Príncipe	0.396		0.476		0.616		0.569		0.592				
Suriname	4.209		3.077		3.593		4.295		4.557				
Slovakia	11.683	13.915	7.959	7.960	6.639	7.537	5.698	6.862	6.481		1.163	20.42%	importer
Slovenia	7.601	8.292	8.446	9.477	6.968	9.469	6.076	8.899	5.921		2.823	46.47%	importer
Sweden	6.736	10.015	5.973	10.106	4.246	7.214	3.522	5.936	3.425		2.414	68.56%	importer
Eswatini	1.124		0.947		0.856		0.898		0.912				
Sint Maarten	20.474		19.127		16.877		13.477		14.705				
Seychelles	2.114		4.436		5.649		5.101		5.337				
Syria	2.985		2.684		1.718		1.259		1.266				
Turks and Caicos Islands	5.313		7.932		8.823		6.992		7.558				
Chad	0.065		0.077		0.131		0.108		0.113				
Togo	0.252	0.331	0.301	0.198	0.275	0.268	0.266	0.835	0.271		0.569	214.24%	importer
Thailand	1.570	2.151	3.453	3.302	4.134	3.721	3.881	3.843	3.890		−0.038	−0.97%	exporter
Tajikistan	2.225	0.952	0.352	0.937	0.880	1.765	0.989	1.354	1.060		0.366	37.00%	importer
Turkmenistan	8.416		9.300		12.291		11.525		13.089				
Timor-Leste			0.181		0.510		0.553		0.557				
Tonga	0.853		1.075		1.286		1.616		1.649				
Trinidad and Tobago	13.408	9.275	27.715	11.002	27.267	16.396	23.553	17.253	23.677		−6.300	−26.75%	exporter
Tunisia	1.555	1.884	2.144	1.467	2.581	1.875	2.268	2.083	2.575		−0.185	−8.14%	exporter
Turkey	2.792	3.970	3.854	4.408	5.241	5.387	4.914	4.779	5.263		−0.134	−2.74%	exporter
Tuvalu	1.195		0.738		0.675		0.697		0.708				
Taiwan	6.027	8.499	11.689	13.240	12.036	12.231	11.094	11.646	11.855		0.552	4.98%	importer
Tanzania	0.081	0.139	0.136	0.222	0.203	0.297	0.199	0.286	0.205		0.087	43.60%	importer
Uganda	0.043	0.086	0.072	0.127	0.134	0.190	0.124	0.168	0.126		0.044	35.70%	importer
Ukraine	13.682	9.704	6.673	5.327	4.996	4.065	4.713	4.332	4.637		−0.380	−8.07%	exporter
Uruguay	1.273	1.575	1.726	2.288	1.801	2.914	1.836	2.953	1.967		1.117	60.83%	importer
United States	20.648	20.348	20.676	22.669	15.801	17.088	14.037	15.471	14.859		1.434	10.21%	importer
Uzbekistan	5.023		4.387		3.410		3.527		3.569				
Saint Vincent and the Grenadines	0.716		1.962		2.048		1.853		2.048				
Venezuela	6.168	4.763	6.143	3.859	4.593	2.155	2.684	0.634	2.828		−2.050	−76.37%	exporter
British Virgin Islands	4.215		7.633		5.602		4.652		5.090				
Vietnam	0.318	0.348	1.139	0.883	2.478	1.603	3.403	2.108	3.345		−1.295	−38.06%	exporter
Vanuatu	0.437		0.269		0.480		0.546		0.548				
Wallis and Futuna	1.359		2.011		2.144		2.318		2.387				
Samoa	0.523		0.893		1.182		1.331		1.344				
Yemen	0.712		0.928		0.353		0.376		0.378				
South Africa	7.847	5.495	8.485	5.875	7.757	5.580	7.412	5.142	7.340		−2.270	−30.62%	exporter
Zambia	0.313	0.356	0.194	0.362	0.396	0.477	0.385	0.391	0.394		0.006	1.54%	importer
Zimbabwe	1.538	1.780	0.875	0.912	0.651	0.712	0.677	0.741	0.706		0.064	9.48%	importer
Africa	1.033	0.923	1.140	0.946	1.092	1.037	1.019	0.976	1.041		−0.043	−4.18%	exporter
Asia	2.059	2.042	3.148	2.808	4.363	4.044	4.437	4.126	4.621		−0.311	−7.00%	exporter
Asia (excl. China and India)	2.991	3.085	3.595	3.529	4.148	3.899	3.957	3.763	4.036		−0.194	−4.91%	exporter
Europe	11.126	10.747	8.800	9.468	7.555	8.091	6.707	7.283	7.112		0.576	8.59%	importer
Europe (excl. EU-27)	13.734	11.086	9.040	8.077	8.315	7.854	7.916	7.396	8.349		−0.520	−6.56%	exporter
Europe (excl. EU-28)	14.481	10.944	8.937	6.963	9.002	7.730	8.787	7.530	9.269		−1.257	−14.31%	exporter
European Union (27)	9.236	10.501	8.635	10.424	7.038	8.253	5.888	7.207	6.276		1.319	22.40%	importer
European Union (28)	9.390	10.645	8.735	10.671	6.886	8.259	5.754	7.171	6.128		1.417	24.62%	importer
North America	14.233	14.023	14.253	15.400	11.065	11.731	9.773	10.530	10.283		0.758	7.75%	importer
North America (excl. US)	5.036	4.956	5.490	5.483	4.841	4.692	4.223	4.100	4.350		−0.123	−2.91%	exporter
Oceania	11.675	10.187	12.944	11.506	11.206	10.021	10.355	9.007	10.021		−1.348	−13.02%	exporter
South America	2.019	2.034	2.421	2.178	2.673	2.628	2.274	2.178	2.476		−0.096	−4.20%	exporter
Low-income countries (UN)	0.635	0.062	0.398	0.057	0.304	0.109	0.284	0.110	0.287		−0.174	−61.19%	exporter
Middle-income countries (UN)													
Lower middle income	1.112	0.928	1.263	1.074	1.760	1.580	1.760	1.585	1.847		−0.175	−9.94%	exporter
Upper middle income	3.737	3.235	4.655	3.721	6.239	5.508	6.370	5.644	6.672		−0.726	−11.40%	exporter
High-income countries	12.107	12.968	12.793	14.579	10.912	12.069	9.689	10.905	10.148		1.216	12.55%	importer

== See also ==
- List of countries by carbon dioxide emissions
- List of countries by greenhouse gas emissions
- List of countries by greenhouse gas emissions per capita
- Climate change
- Land use, land-use change, and forestry (LULUCF)
- List of countries by carbon intensity of GDP
- List of countries by renewable electricity production
- United Nations | Sustainable Development Goal 13 – Climate action
