= List of countries by carbon dioxide emissions =

Global map of Carbon dioxide (CO_{2}) emissions from fossil fuels and industry. Land use change is not included.

Annual CO_{2} emissions by region. This measures fossil fuel and industry emissions. Land use change is not included.

Cumulative CO_{2} emissions by world region.

This is a list of sovereign states and territories by carbon dioxide emissions (Note: Carbon dioxide (CO_{2}) is a colourless, odourless and non-poisonous gas formed by combustion of carbon and in the respiration of living organisms and is considered a greenhouse gas. Emissions means the release of greenhouse gases and/or their precursors into the atmosphere over a specified area and period of time. Carbon dioxide emissions or CO_{2} emissions are emissions stemming from the burning of fossil fuels and the manufacture of cement; they include carbon dioxide produced during consumption of solid, liquid, and gas fuels as well as gas flaring) due to certain forms of human activity, based on the EDGAR database created by the European Commission and Netherlands Environmental Assessment Agency. The following table lists the annual CO_{2} emissions estimates (in kilotons of CO_{2} per year) for the year 2023, as well as the change from the year 2000.

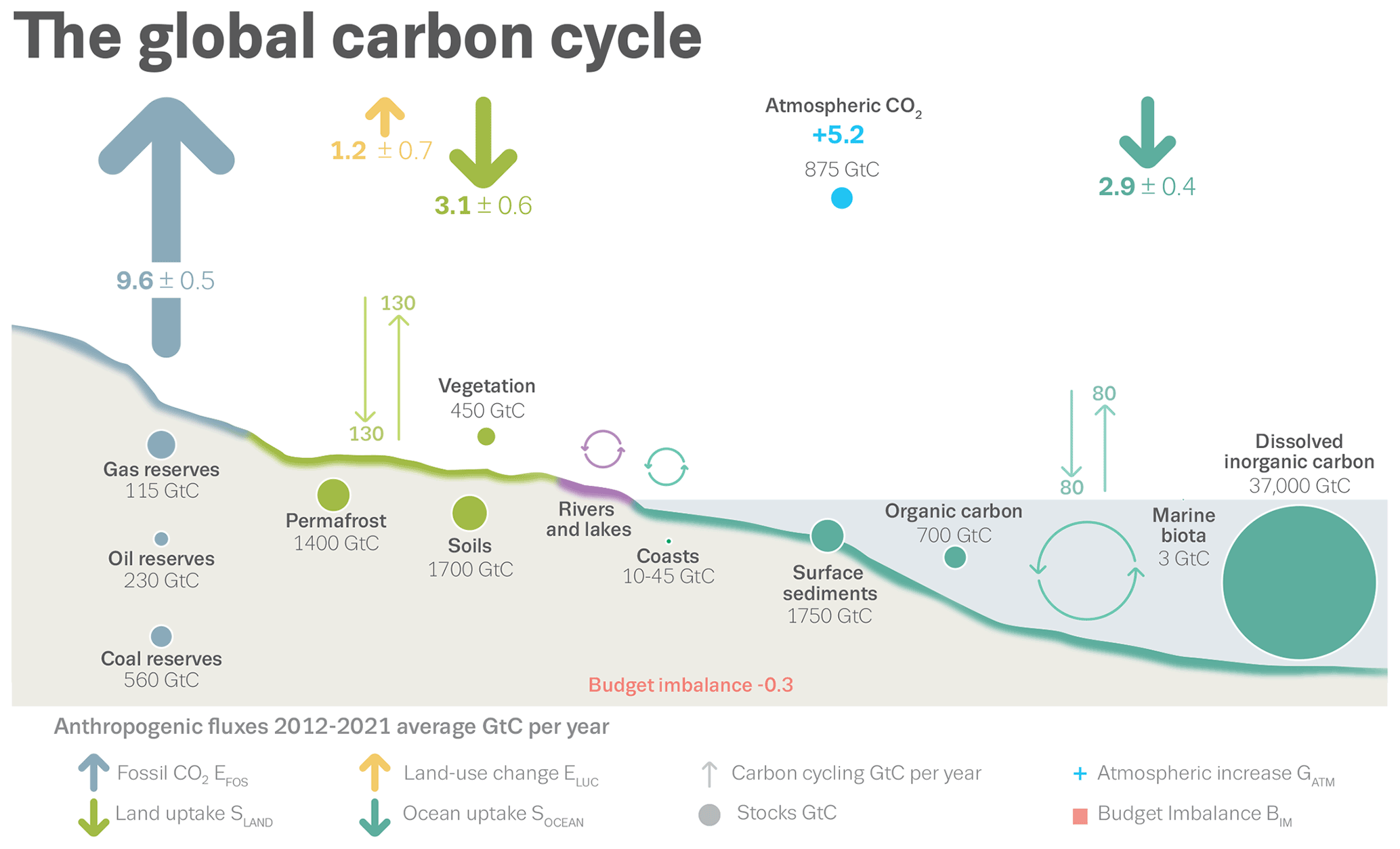
The data only consider carbon dioxide emissions from the burning of fossil fuels and cement manufacture, but not emissions from land use, land-use change and forestry. (Note: Global Carbon Project (2022) The rate of build-up of carbon dioxide (CO_{2}) in the atmosphere can be reduced by taking advantage of the fact that atmospheric CO_{2} can accumulate as carbon in vegetation and soils in terrestrial ecosystems. Under the United Nations Framework Convention on Climate Change any process, activity or mechanism which removes a greenhouse gas (GHG) from the atmosphere is referred to as a "sink". Human activities impact terrestrial sinks, through land use, land-use change and forestry (LULUCF), consequently, the exchange of CO_{2} (carbon cycle) between the terrestrial biosphere and the atmosphere is altered.) Over the last 150 years, estimated cumulative emissions from land use and land-use change represent approximately one-third of total cumulative anthropogenic CO_{2} emissions. Emissions from international shipping or bunker fuels are also not included in national figures, which can make a large difference for small countries with important ports.

In 2023, global GHG emissions reached 53.0 Gt_{CO_{2}eq} (without Land Use, land Use Change and Forestry). The 2023 data represent the highest level recorded and experienced an increase of 1.9% or 994 Mt_{CO_{2}eq} compared to the levels in 2022. The majority of GHG emissions consisted of fossil CO_{2} accounting for 73.7% of total emissions.

China, the United States, India, the European Union, Russia and Brazil were the world's largest GHG emitters in 2023. Together they account for 49.8% of global population, 63.2% of global gross domestic product, 64.2% of global fossil fuel consumption and 62.7% of global GHG emissions. Among these top emitters, in 2023 China, India, Russia and Brazil increased their emissions compared to 2022, with India having the largest increase in relative terms (+ 6.1%) and China the largest absolute increase by 784 Mt_{CO_{2}eq}.

CO_{2} emissions from the top 10 countries with the highest emissions accounted for almost two thirds of the global total. Since 2006, China has been emitting more CO_{2} than any other country. However, the main disadvantage of measuring total national emissions is that it does not take population size into account. China has the largest CO_{2} emissions in the world, but also the second largest population. Some argue that for a fair comparison, emissions should be analyzed in terms of the amount of CO_{2} per capita. Their main argument is illustrated by CO_{2} per capita emissions in 2023, China's levels (9.24) are almost two thirds those of the United States (13.83) and less than a sixth of those of Palau (62.59 – the country with the highest emissions of CO_{2} per capita).

Measures of territorial-based emissions, also known as production-based emissions, do not account for emissions embedded in global trade, where emissions may be imported or exported in the form of traded goods, as it only reports emissions emitted within geographical boundaries. Accordingly, a proportion of the CO_{2} produced and reported in Asia and Africa is for the production of goods consumed in Europe and North America.

Greenhouse gases (GHG) – primarily carbon dioxide but also others, including methane and chlorofluorocarbons – trap heat in the atmosphere, leading to global warming. Higher temperatures then act on the climate, with varying effects. For example, dry regions might become drier while, at the poles, the ice caps are melting, causing higher sea levels. In 2016, the global average temperature was already 1.1°C above pre-industrial levels.

According to the review of the scientific literature conducted by the Intergovernmental Panel on Climate Change (IPCC), carbon dioxide is the most important anthropogenic greenhouse gas by warming contribution. The other major anthropogenic greenhouse gases (Note: Greenhouse gases (GHG) constitute a group of gases contributing to global warming and climate change. The Kyoto Protocol, an environmental agreement adopted by many of the parties to the United Nations Framework Convention on Climate Change (UNFCCC) in 1997 to curb global warming, nowadays covers seven greenhouse gases: the non-fluorinated gases: carbon dioxide (CO_{2}), methane (CH_{4}), nitrous oxide (N_{2}O), the fluorinated gases: hydrofluorocarbons (HFCs), perfluorocarbons (PFCs), sulphur hexafluoride (SF_{6}), nitrogen trifluoride (NF_{3}).; Converting them to carbon dioxide (or CO_{2}) equivalents makes it possible to compare them and to determine their individual and total contributions to global warming.)) are not included in the following list, nor are humans emissions of water vapor (H_{2}O), the most important greenhouse gases, as they are negligible compared to naturally occurring quantities. Space-based measurements of carbon dioxide should allow independent monitoring in the mid-2020s.

== Fossil carbon dioxide emissions by country ==
List of countries by carbon emissions
Location	% of global total	Fossil emissions (1,000,000 tons per year)		% change from 2000
Location	% of global total	2023	2000	% change from 2000
World	100%	39,023.94	25,725.44	▲ +52%
China	34.0%	13,259.64	3,666.95	▲ +262%
United States	12.0%	4,682.04	5,928.97	▼ −21%
India	7.6%	2,955.18	995.65	▲ +197%
European Union post-Brexit	6.5%	2,517.27	3,566.76	▼ −29%
Russia	5.3%	2,069.50	1,681.14	▲ +23%
Japan	2.4%	944.76	1,248.81	▼ −24%
Iran	2.0%	778.80	353.93	▲ +120%
International Shipping	1.8%	706.32	503.29	▲ +40%
Indonesia	1.7%	674.54	299.09	▲ +126%
Saudi Arabia	1.6%	622.91	265.24	▲ +135%
Germany	1.5%	582.95	871.74	▼ −33%
Canada	1.5%	575.01	543.04	▲ +6%
South Korea	1.5%	573.54	474.16	▲ +21%
International Aviation	1.3%	491.63	355.32	▲ +38%
Mexico	1.2%	487.09	396.71	▲ +23%
Brazil	1.2%	479.50	349.40	▲ +37%
Turkey	1.1%	438.32	227.05	▲ +93%
South Africa	1.0%	397.37	347.30	▲ +14%
Australia	1.0%	373.62	353.87	▲ +6%
Vietnam	1.0%	372.95	56.52	▲ +560%
Italy, San Marino and Vatican City	0.8%	305.49	454.72	▼ −33%
United Kingdom	0.8%	302.10	551.68	▼ −45%
Poland	0.7%	286.91	313.02	▼ −8%
Malaysia	0.7%	283.32	130.78	▲ +117%
France and Monaco	0.7%	282.43	401.21	▼ −30%
Taiwan	0.7%	279.85	238.02	▲ +18%
Thailand	0.7%	274.16	174.82	▲ +57%
Egypt	0.6%	249.33	127.91	▲ +95%
Kazakhstan	0.6%	239.87	132.22	▲ +81%
Spain and Andorra	0.6%	217.26	313.24	▼ −31%
United Arab Emirates	0.5%	205.99	88.46	▲ +133%
Pakistan	0.5%	200.51	111.87	▲ +79%
Iraq	0.5%	192.91	88.81	▲ +117%
Argentina	0.5%	183.78	136.76	▲ +34%
Algeria	0.5%	180.36	87.94	▲ +105%
Philippines	0.4%	161.29	74.25	▲ +117%
Uzbekistan	0.4%	137.90	130.67	▲ +6%
Ukraine	0.3%	136.20	360.02	▼ −62%
Nigeria	0.3%	127.94	100.30	▲ +28%
Qatar	0.3%	127.91	31.75	▲ +303%
Bangladesh	0.3%	124.79	26.97	▲ +363%
Netherlands	0.3%	122.87	176.91	▼ −31%
Kuwait	0.3%	111.63	54.48	▲ +105%
Colombia	0.3%	100.86	62.57	▲ +61%
Oman	0.2%	93.09	26.32	▲ +254%
Czech Republic	0.2%	90.51	132.31	▼ −32%
Venezuela	0.2%	84.60	137.75	▼ −39%
Belgium	0.2%	84.31	124.97	▼ −33%
Chile	0.2%	84.00	53.85	▲ +56%
Romania	0.2%	70.77	97.42	▼ −27%
Morocco	0.2%	69.86	33.56	▲ +108%
Turkmenistan	0.2%	65.99	39.34	▲ +68%
North Korea	0.2%	64.27	73.81	▼ −13%
Libya	0.2%	61.26	49.28	▲ +24%
Israel and Palestine	0.2%	61.25	59.30	▲ +3%
Austria	0.2%	58.82	66.69	▼ −12%
Peru	0.1%	58.40	28.98	▲ +102%
Singapore	0.1%	57.07	45.52	▲ +25%
Serbia and Montenegro	0.1%	56.12	50.64	▲ +11%
Belarus	0.1%	54.18	56.26	▼ −4%
Greece	0.1%	51.67	96.05	▼ −46%
Ecuador	0.1%	45.33	22.04	▲ +106%
Norway	0.1%	44.07	41.77	▲ +5%
Hungary	0.1%	43.83	59.48	▼ −26%
Azerbaijan	0.1%	42.77	28.79	▲ +49%
Bulgaria	0.1%	39.79	48.17	▼ −17%
Bahrain	0.1%	37.43	17.77	▲ +111%
Portugal	0.09%	36.17	64.41	▼ −44%
New Zealand	0.09%	35.80	32.89	▲ +9%
Sweden	0.09%	35.39	57.98	▼ −39%
Slovakia	0.09%	34.86	41.68	▼ −16%
Hong Kong	0.09%	34.67	41.90	▼ −17%
Switzerland and Liechtenstein	0.09%	34.22	44.80	▼ −24%
Myanmar	0.09%	33.37	10.04	▲ +232%
Ireland	0.08%	32.48	43.82	▼ −26%
Finland	0.08%	32.27	57.53	▼ −44%
Tunisia	0.08%	31.50	21.13	▲ +49%
Dominican Republic	0.08%	31.35	19.01	▲ +65%
Angola	0.07%	28.23	16.51	▲ +71%
Mongolia	0.07%	28.12	9.04	▲ +211%
Trinidad and Tobago	0.07%	27.22	19.13	▲ +42%
Denmark	0.07%	26.77	53.16	▼ −50%
Laos	0.07%	26.02	0.93	▲ +2%
Syria	0.07%	25.59	45.90	▼ −44%
Ghana	0.06%	24.16	6.09	▲ +297%
Bolivia	0.06%	23.81	8.20	▲ +190%
Jordan	0.06%	23.58	16.47	▲ +43%
Cuba	0.06%	22.07	28.99	▼ −24%
Bosnia and Herzegovina	0.06%	22.00	14.28	▲ +54%
Kenya	0.06%	21.73	8.91	▲ +144%
Guatemala	0.05%	21.35	9.69	▲ +120%
Sudan and South Sudan	0.05%	21.27	6.00	▲ +255%
Sri Lanka	0.05%	20.52	11.46	▲ +79%
Tanzania	0.05%	19.37	3.11	▲ +523%
Cambodia	0.05%	17.97	2.00	▲ +798%
Nepal	0.05%	17.93	3.42	▲ +424%
Croatia	0.04%	17.46	19.37	▼ −10%
Lebanon	0.04%	17.33	15.31	▲ +13%
Ethiopia	0.04%	16.71	3.88	▲ +331%
Panama	0.04%	14.72	5.19	▲ +184%
Ivory Coast	0.04%	14.41	6.97	▲ +107%
Puerto Rico	0.04%	13.82	25.18	▼ −45%
Lithuania	0.03%	13.11	11.66	▲ +13%
Georgia	0.03%	12.86	5.21	▲ +147%
Slovenia	0.03%	12.08	15.04	▼ −20%
Senegal	0.03%	12.02	3.99	▲ +201%
Zimbabwe	0.03%	11.74	14.60	▼ −20%
Estonia	0.03%	11.44	17.38	▼ −34%
Honduras	0.03%	10.95	5.00	▲ +119%
Yemen	0.03%	10.90	15.74	▼ −31%
Cameroon	0.03%	10.76	5.73	▲ +88%
Kyrgyzstan	0.03%	10.46	4.80	▲ +118%
Moldova	0.03%	9.93	6.89	▲ +44%
Mozambique	0.02%	9.74	1.57	▲ +520%
Brunei	0.02%	9.72	6.07	▲ +60%
Tajikistan	0.02%	9.31	2.78	▲ +234%
Uruguay	0.02%	8.82	5.57	▲ +58%
North Macedonia	0.02%	8.76	9.04	▼ −3%
Afghanistan	0.02%	8.71	1.02	▲ +757%
Costa Rica	0.02%	8.57	5.12	▲ +67%
El Salvador	0.02%	8.38	5.80	▲ +45%
Paraguay	0.02%	8.25	3.64	▲ +127%
Zambia	0.02%	8.06	1.95	▲ +313%
Armenia	0.02%	7.73	3.57	▲ +116%
Botswana	0.02%	7.42	4.10	▲ +81%
Congo	0.02%	7.25	4.51	▲ +61%
Uganda	0.02%	7.22	1.41	▲ +411%
Cyprus	0.02%	7.18	7.13	▲ +1%
Luxembourg	0.02%	7.01	8.80	▼ −20%
Jamaica	0.02%	6.86	10.21	▼ −33%
Mali	0.02%	6.66	0.80	▲ +730%
Latvia	0.02%	6.55	7.23	▼ −9%
Malawi	0.02%	6.45	3.10	▲ +108%
Benin	0.02%	6.44	1.54	▲ +317%
New Caledonia	0.02%	6.21	2.18	▲ +185%
Burkina Faso	0.02%	6.00	0.88	▲ +583%
Papua New Guinea	0.02%	5.95	2.95	▲ +102%
Nicaragua	0.01%	5.73	3.77	▲ +52%
Gabon	0.01%	4.93	6.60	▼ −25%
Mauritania	0.01%	4.65	1.07	▲ +336%
Albania	0.01%	4.59	3.23	▲ +42%
Namibia	0.01%	4.36	1.95	▲ +124%
Mauritius	0.01%	4.21	2.44	▲ +73%
Madagascar	0.01%	4.10	1.69	▲ +142%
Democratic Republic of the Congo	0.01%	3.80	1.88	▲ +102%
Equatorial Guinea	0.01%	3.78	2.74	▲ +38%
Guinea	0.01%	3.72	1.47	▲ +153%
Haiti	0.009%	3.54	1.69	▲ +109%
Guyana	0.008%	3.30	1.66	▲ +99%
Iceland	0.008%	3.09	2.85	▲ +8%
Macao	0.008%	3.01	1.48	▲ +104%
Maldives	0.007%	2.88	0.64	▲ +352%
Niger	0.007%	2.82	0.70	▲ +302%
Suriname	0.007%	2.63	1.48	▲ +78%
Chad	0.007%	2.57	0.24	▲ +962%
Réunion	0.007%	2.57	2.05	▲ +25%
Togo	0.006%	2.49	1.25	▲ +99%
Curaçao	0.006%	2.43	5.67	▼ −57%
Fiji	0.006%	2.21	1.46	▲ +51%
Bhutan	0.005%	1.99	0.41	▲ +388%
Malta	0.004%	1.68	2.13	▼ −21%
Bahamas	0.004%	1.68	1.00	▲ +69%
Rwanda	0.004%	1.65	0.68	▲ +142%
Liberia	0.004%	1.64	0.40	▲ +307%
Palau	0.004%	1.44	2.12	▼ −32%
Eswatini	0.004%	1.39	1.10	▲ +27%
French Polynesia	0.003%	1.26	0.72	▲ +75%
Seychelles	0.003%	1.24	0.76	▲ +63%
Guadeloupe	0.003%	1.17	0.62	▲ +89%
Martinique	0.003%	1.09	0.67	▲ +62%
Sierra Leone	0.003%	1.07	0.43	▲ +147%
Cape Verde	0.003%	1.01	0.28	▲ +256%
Lesotho	0.002%	0.88	0.35	▲ +148%
Somalia	0.002%	0.87	0.63	▲ +38%
Burundi	0.002%	0.84	0.29	▲ +186%
Barbados	0.002%	0.80	0.59	▲ +35%
Djibouti	0.002%	0.75	0.74	▲ +1%
East Timor	0.002%	0.70	0.23	▲ +208%
Gibraltar	0.002%	0.69	0.34	▲ +102%
Eritrea	0.002%	0.67	0.67	no change%
Gambia	0.002%	0.61	0.27	▲ +126%
Greenland	0.001%	0.58	0.00	▲ +43%
Aruba	0.001%	0.53	0.27	▲ +97%
Samoa	0.001%	0.47	0.19	▲ +149%
Solomon Islands	0.001%	0.42	0.24	▲ +78%
French Guiana	0.001%	0.38	0.17	▲ +119%
Central African Republic	0.001%	0.37	0.26	▲ +43%
Cayman Islands	0.001%	0.36	0.13	▲ +172%
Bermuda	0.001%	0.35	0.15	▲ +133%
Guinea-Bissau	0.001%	0.35	0.20	▲ +71%
Antigua and Barbuda	0.001%	0.32	0.14	▲ +139%
Comoros	0.001%	0.32	0.09	▲ +250%
Saint Lucia	0.001%	0.30	0.10	▲ +207%
Vanuatu	0.001%	0.29	0.08	▲ +238%
Belize	0.001%	0.28	0.14	▲ +101%
Western Sahara	0.001%	0.26	0.26	▲ +4%
Tonga	0.001%	0.22	0.10	▲ +118%
São Tomé and Príncipe	0.001%	0.21	0.06	▲ +288%
Grenada	0.0004%	0.14	0.06	▲ +149%
Cook Islands	0.0004%	0.14	0.06	▲ +133%
Saint Kitts and Nevis	0.0003%	0.12	0.05	▲ +140%
Turks and Caicos Islands	0.0003%	0.10	0.02	▲ +481%
Kiribati	0.0002%	0.10	0.03	▲ +197%
Saint Vincent and the Grenadines	0.0002%	0.10	0.04	▲ +131%
Dominica	0.0002%	0.08	0.06	▲ +44%
British Virgin Islands	0.0002%	0.08	0.03	▲ +172%
Saint Pierre and Miquelon	0.0001%	0.04	0.02	▲ +129%
Anguilla	0.0001%	0.02	0.02	▲ +48%
Falkland Islands	0.0000%	0.02	0.01	▲ +170%
Saint Helena, Ascension and Tristan da Cunha	0.0000%	0.02	0.01	▲ +58%
Faroe Islands	0.0000%	0.00	0.00	▲ +20%

== Fossil CO_{2} emissions 2023 vs. fossil CO_{2} emissions per capita 2023 ==
Fossil CO_{2} emissions 2023 (kt_{CO_{2}}/year) and Fossil CO_{2} emissions per capita 2023 (t_{CO_{2}}/year)
Fossil CO_{2} emissions 2023	Country/Territory/Region/Group	Fossil CO_{2} emissions per capita 2023
kt_{CO_{2}}	Country/Territory/Region/Group	t_{CO_{2}}
13259638.95	China	9.24
4682039.41	United States	13.83
2955181.68	India	2.07
2069502.01	Russia	14.45
944758.61	Japan	7.54
778802.30	Iran	9.10
674535.94	Indonesia	2.41
622913.60	Saudi Arabia	17.15
582950.58	Germany	7.06
575011.96	Canada	14.91
573535.66	South Korea	11.04
487093.94	Mexico	3.52
479504.23	Brazil	2.20
438315.56	Turkey	5.13
397372.96	South Africa	6.56
373616.42	Australia	14.21
372948.52	Vietnam	3.69
305490.18	Italy, San Marino and Holy See	5.19
302103.28	United Kingdom	4.42
286906.78	Poland	7.63
283323.53	Malaysia	8.30
282427.47	France and Monaco	4.25
279847.35	Taiwan	11.68
274160.05	Thailand	3.94
249331.85	Egypt	2.31
239867.11	Kazakhstan	12.43
217261.72	Spain and Andorra	4.68
205991.30	United Arab Emirates	20.22
200510.13	Pakistan	0.91
192908.24	Iraq	4.30
183778.42	Argentina	3.93
180357.65	Algeria	3.99
161288.34	Philippines	1.41
137900.11	Uzbekistan	4.01
136197.95	Ukraine	3.17
127941.73	Nigeria	0.58
127907.89	Qatar	43.55
124793.36	Bangladesh	0.71
122872.05	Netherlands	7.09
111633.54	Kuwait	24.90
100862.71	Colombia	1.97
93094.19	Oman	17.11
90512.80	Czech Republic	8.52
84595.29	Venezuela	2.47
84306.06	Belgium	7.18
83999.23	Chile	4.45
70773.31	Romania	3.70
69858.02	Morocco	1.82
65987.68	Turkmenistan	10.51
64274.51	North Korea	2.46
61258.60	Libya	8.88
61254.99	Israel and State of Palestine	4.13
58815.13	Austria	6.65
58403.36	Peru	1.70
57068.33	Singapore	9.38
56120.92	Serbia and Montenegro	6.08
54175.66	Belarus	5.79
51674.00	Greece	4.69
45328.16	Ecuador	2.51
44065.20	Norway	7.86
43825.23	Hungary	4.61
42766.20	Azerbaijan	4.14
39792.57	Bulgaria	5.86
37425.57	Bahrain	20.70
36171.35	Portugal	3.58
35795.09	New Zealand	7.22
35392.17	Sweden	3.43
34861.57	Slovakia	6.40
34672.84	Hong Kong	4.51
34221.71	Switzerland and Liechtenstein	3.87
33368.37	Myanmar	0.59
32482.58	Ireland	6.50
32268.88	Finland	5.73
31497.46	Tunisia	2.57
31350.81	Dominican Republic	2.74
28229.93	Angola	0.78
28117.12	Mongolia	8.45
27216.18	Trinidad and Tobago	19.71
26772.91	Denmark	4.56
26020.84	Laos	3.49
25594.86	Syria	1.19
24163.79	Ghana	0.74
23806.93	Bolivia	1.98
23578.98	Jordan	2.25
22066.99	Cuba	1.92
21996.75	Bosnia and Herzegovina	6.33
21733.67	Kenya	0.38
21349.41	Guatemala	1.13
21273.31	Sudan and South Sudan	0.34
20518.00	Sri Lanka	0.97
19373.46	Tanzania	0.28
17970.08	Cambodia	1.03
17933.78	Nepal	0.57
17456.50	Croatia	4.31
17332.05	Lebanon	3.00
16707.69	Ethiopia	0.14
14720.53	Panama	3.29
14412.45	Ivory Coast	0.51
13815.29	Puerto Rico	3.80
13114.62	Lithuania	4.66
12863.60	Georgia	3.33
12076.46	Slovenia	5.81
12023.94	Senegal	0.65
11744.05	Zimbabwe	0.62
11436.37	Estonia	8.87
10945.76	Honduras	1.08
10898.84	Yemen	0.34
10755.63	Cameroon	0.38
10463.99	Kyrgyzstan	1.60
9928.22	Moldova	2.50
9740.08	Mozambique	0.28
9716.06	Brunei	21.12
9308.19	Tajikistan	0.93
8817.28	Uruguay	2.50
8763.66	North Macedonia	4.19
8707.35	Afghanistan	0.21
8573.34	Costa Rica	1.66
8379.62	El Salvador	1.27
8253.94	Paraguay	1.13
8058.98	Zambia	0.40
7725.14	Armenia	2.63
7424.70	Botswana	2.93
7250.79	Congo	1.18
7217.41	Uganda	0.14
7183.30	Cyprus	5.83
7007.46	Luxembourg	11.18
6864.73	Jamaica	2.34
6660.68	Mali	0.30
6551.10	Latvia	3.56
6447.68	Malawi	0.29
6437.90	Benin	0.49
6208.56	New Caledonia	20.90
5999.25	Burkina Faso	0.26
5951.82	Papua New Guinea	0.64
5725.29	Nicaragua	0.87
4926.90	Gabon	2.16
4650.27	Mauritania	0.90
4591.83	Albania	1.56
4364.59	Namibia	1.53
4213.59	Mauritius	3.29
4099.12	Madagascar	0.14
3799.54	Democratic Republic of the Congo	0.04
3776.75	Equatorial Guinea	2.44
3715.38	Guinea	0.25
3536.48	Haiti	0.30
3304.16	Guyana	4.11
3086.23	Iceland	8.79
3012.36	Macao	4.42
2876.31	Maldives	6.00
2822.85	Niger	0.10
2628.56	Suriname	4.45
2571.41	Chad	0.14
2570.71	Réunion	2.81
2492.58	Togo	0.28
2434.14	Curaçao	14.66
2210.54	Fiji	2.35
1986.67	Bhutan	2.31
1684.62	Malta	3.85
1683.71	Bahamas	4.04
1645.97	Rwanda	0.12
1636.89	Liberia	0.30
1439.59	Palau	62.59
1390.16	Eswatini	0.92
1258.99	French Polynesia	4.27
1237.26	Seychelles	12.76
1167.14	Guadeloupe	2.61
1091.37	Martinique	2.83
1074.94	Sierra Leone	0.13
1006.33	Cape Verde	1.71
878.31	Lesotho	0.36
868.15	Somalia	0.05
844.33	Burundi	0.06
796.21	Barbados	2.76
749.20	Djibouti	0.72
702.89	Timor-Leste	0.48
688.59	Gibraltar	19.67
668.50	Eritrea	0.12
605.83	The Gambia	0.24
582.22	Greenland	10.21
530.03	Aruba	4.91
468.45	Samoa	2.30
418.85	Solomon Islands	0.61
381.63	French Guiana	1.17
368.38	Central African Republic	0.07
358.01	Cayman Islands	5.42
350.52	Bermuda	5.84
346.02	Guinea-Bissau	0.16
323.11	Antigua and Barbuda	2.99
317.70	Comoros	0.34
296.56	Saint Lucia	1.62
287.30	Vanuatu	0.92
278.45	Belize	0.66
264.76	Western Sahara	0.41
220.00	Tonga	1.95
214.08	São Tomé and Príncipe	0.92
142.70	Grenada	1.29
142.21	Cook Islands	8.37
118.78	Saint Kitts and Nevis	2.05
103.10	Turks and Caicos Islands	2.71
97.44	Kiribati	0.76
96.29	Saint Vincent and the Grenadines	0.87
79.85	Dominica	1.05
75.29	British Virgin Islands	2.21
40.11	Saint Pierre and Miquelon	5.73
22.96	Anguilla	1.43
19.45	Falkland Islands	6.48
17.77	Saint Helena, Ascension and Tristan da Cunha	4.44
2.10	Faroe Islands	0.04
39023937.04	(United Nations) Global Total	4.86
2512.07	European Union	5.66

== Cumulative fossil CO_{2} emissions 1970-2023 vs. fossil CO_{2} emissions 2023 ==
Total fossil CO_{2} emissions 1970-2023 (kt_{CO_{2}}) and Fossil CO_{2} emissions 2023 (kt_{CO_{2}})
Fossil CO_{2} emissions 1970-2023	Country/Territory/Region/Group	Fossil CO_{2} emissions 2023
kt_{CO_{2}}	Country/Territory/Region/Group	kt_{CO_{2}}
277924506.81	China	13259638.95
276168319.65	United States	4682039.41
98657349.81	Russia	2069502.01
60679458.92	Japan	944758.61
59485104.14	India	2955181.68
50139186.21	Germany	582950.58
28997941.85	United Kingdom	302103.28
26832418.10	Canada	575011.96
24606502.43	Ukraine	136197.95
21743058.98	France and Monaco	282427.47
21434526.94	Italy, San Marino and Holy See	305490.18
20405932.48	South Korea	573535.66
19387921.77	Poland	286906.78
19331228.41	Iran	778802.30
18779872.84	Mexico	487093.94
18688645.29	South Africa	397372.96
16857665.19	Brazil	479504.23
16722319.55	Australia	373616.42
16205199.78	Saudi Arabia	622913.60
15267857.36	Indonesia	674535.94
13483082.79	Spain and Andorra	217261.72
11731337.82	Kazakhstan	239867.11
11531297.23	Turkey	438315.56
9957070.41	Taiwan	279847.35
8788134.24	Netherlands	122872.05
8148937.06	Thailand	274160.05
7978665.75	Czech Republic	90512.80
7292160.06	Argentina	183778.42
7144673.44	Romania	70773.31
7093742.60	Egypt	249331.85
6757041.14	Malaysia	283323.53
6332495.66	Belgium	84306.06
6300583.67	Venezuela	84595.29
5925389.53	Uzbekistan	137900.11
5548071.50	United Arab Emirates	205991.30
5545304.17	Pakistan	200510.13
5131741.75	Algeria	180357.65
5127094.26	Vietnam	372948.52
4915250.74	Nigeria	127941.73
4907091.07	Iraq	192908.24
4687917.39	North Korea	64274.51
3973125.77	Belarus	54175.66
3810102.31	Greece	51674.00
3732766.71	Philippines	161288.34
3580257.33	Hungary	43825.23
3495925.92	Austria	58815.13
3491404.22	Bulgaria	39792.57
3280970.85	Sweden	35392.17
3205803.86	Kuwait	111633.54
3153749.01	Colombia	100862.71
2907798.46	Serbia and Montenegro	56120.92
2878947.79	Finland	32268.88
2813937.59	Denmark	26772.91
2763059.46	Chile	83999.23
2539061.05	Qatar	127907.89
2491369.82	Slovakia	34861.57
2469850.02	Israel and State of Palestine	61254.99
2349928.37	Portugal	36171.35
2340089.97	Turkmenistan	65987.68
2329741.97	Switzerland and Liechtenstein	34221.71
2258314.73	Libya	61258.60
2220510.52	Norway	44065.20
2058098.59	Bangladesh	124793.36
1951786.97	Oman	93094.19
1907557.07	Azerbaijan	42766.20
1877854.88	Morocco	69858.02
1860694.73	Singapore	57068.33
1845393.62	Ireland	32482.58
1782454.67	Hong Kong	34672.84
1730562.69	Syria	25594.86
1724886.81	Peru	58403.36
1532695.39	Cuba	22066.99
1505078.75	New Zealand	35795.09
1371845.26	Estonia	11436.37
1270841.18	Ecuador	45328.16
1228158.43	Puerto Rico	13815.29
1178455.32	Croatia	17456.50
1115694.58	Trinidad and Tobago	27216.18
1105176.16	Lithuania	13114.62
994636.05	Bahrain	37425.57
991005.16	Tunisia	31497.46
945995.74	Georgia	12863.60
939361.23	Angola	28229.93
928116.78	Bosnia and Herzegovina	21996.75
891996.90	Moldova	9928.22
799894.74	Dominican Republic	31350.81
784259.39	Slovenia	12076.46
781144.42	Jordan	23578.98
749929.23	Lebanon	17332.05
694191.25	Mongolia	28117.12
685202.55	Kyrgyzstan	10463.99
656986.80	Zimbabwe	11744.05
634469.33	Latvia	6551.10
630583.95	Yemen	10898.84
621045.29	Luxembourg	7007.46
602698.05	Myanmar	33368.37
564801.55	Bolivia	23806.93
554255.44	Sri Lanka	20518.00
523155.04	Sudan and South Sudan	21273.31
514004.22	Armenia	7725.14
509875.73	Kenya	21733.67
491402.57	North Macedonia	8763.66
478180.05	Guatemala	21349.41
428026.83	Jamaica	6864.73
427208.59	Ghana	24163.79
397902.79	Tajikistan	9308.19
338557.33	Ivory Coast	14412.45
328620.95	Curaçao	2434.14
319798.76	Panama	14720.53
314900.38	Uruguay	8817.28
309036.93	Tanzania	19373.46
307860.79	Brunei	9716.06
305613.36	Ethiopia	16707.69
301683.04	Gabon	4926.90
297318.17	Cyprus	7183.30
295004.95	Cameroon	10755.63
278509.50	Honduras	10945.76
273627.88	Albania	4591.83
263602.89	Costa Rica	8573.34
259038.37	Senegal	12023.94
256329.02	El Salvador	8379.62
228120.39	Congo	7250.79
221716.92	Nepal	17933.78
219948.76	Laos	26020.84
209440.23	Zambia	8058.98
204041.80	Cambodia	17970.08
203095.80	Afghanistan	8707.35
200977.03	Paraguay	8253.94
185086.78	Botswana	7424.70
184659.27	Nicaragua	5725.29
183880.07	Papua New Guinea	5951.82
183470.32	Mozambique	9740.08
164373.43	Democratic Republic of the Congo	3799.54
150978.96	Iceland	3086.23
141593.21	Malawi	6447.68
139310.37	New Caledonia	6208.56
137301.70	Benin	6437.90
133919.06	Equatorial Guinea	3776.75
128404.62	Uganda	7217.41
117585.81	Namibia	4364.59
112940.91	Mauritius	4213.59
103826.68	Palau	1439.59
99893.44	Malta	1684.62
96690.53	Guyana	3304.16
93896.63	Mauritania	4650.27
93618.31	Haiti	3536.48
91455.99	Madagascar	4099.12
84825.09	Mali	6660.68
84685.51	Réunion	2570.71
83487.76	Burkina Faso	5999.25
83088.67	Guinea	3715.38
75825.18	Macao	3012.36
73578.17	Suriname	2628.56
68967.01	Fiji	2210.54
65666.82	Bahamas	1683.71
62200.84	Togo	2492.58
55272.64	Niger	2822.85
48045.77	Liberia	1636.89
46188.60	Eswatini	1390.16
44405.05	Djibouti	749.20
39968.03	French Polynesia	1258.99
39057.76	Somalia	868.15
38511.81	Maldives	2876.31
36903.84	Sierra Leone	1074.94
36751.86	Guadeloupe	1167.14
35917.79	Martinique	1091.37
34899.24	Rwanda	1645.97
34094.49	Chad	2571.41
30364.76	Barbados	796.21
30299.27	Bhutan	1986.67
30213.87	Seychelles	1237.26
27697.14	Eritrea	668.50
20887.79	Cape Verde	1006.33
16937.15	Lesotho	878.31
16642.73	Gibraltar	688.59
15351.56	Burundi	844.33
14572.61	Aruba	530.03
14426.63	The Gambia	605.83
12841.75	French Guiana	381.63
12109.43	Timor-Leste	702.89
11979.99	Solomon Islands	418.85
11784.24	Bermuda	350.52
11499.64	Greenland	582.22
10917.56	Guinea-Bissau	346.02
10554.49	Central African Republic	368.38
10377.37	Samoa	468.45
10095.81	Antigua and Barbuda	323.11
9927.02	Western Sahara	264.76
7972.87	Cayman Islands	358.01
7697.23	Belize	278.45
6535.36	Vanuatu	287.30
5801.44	Saint Lucia	296.56
5532.02	Comoros	317.70
5342.05	Tonga	220.00
3894.50	São Tomé and Príncipe	214.08
3513.12	Grenada	142.70
3339.12	Cook Islands	142.21
2807.59	Saint Kitts and Nevis	118.78
2743.51	Saint Vincent and the Grenadines	96.29
2309.85	Dominica	79.85
2234.34	Saint Pierre and Miquelon	40.11
2176.80	Kiribati	97.44
1810.23	British Virgin Islands	75.29
1676.65	Turks and Caicos Islands	103.10
702.23	Anguilla	22.96
519.46	Falkland Islands	19.45
419.29	Saint Helena, Ascension and Tristan da Cunha	17.77
88.33	Faroe Islands	2.10
1424121724.86	(United Nations) Global Total	39023937.04
192562445.97	European Union	2512067.78
18071560.98	International Aviation	491632.31
26005116.55	International Shipping	706320.42

== Maps and charts ==
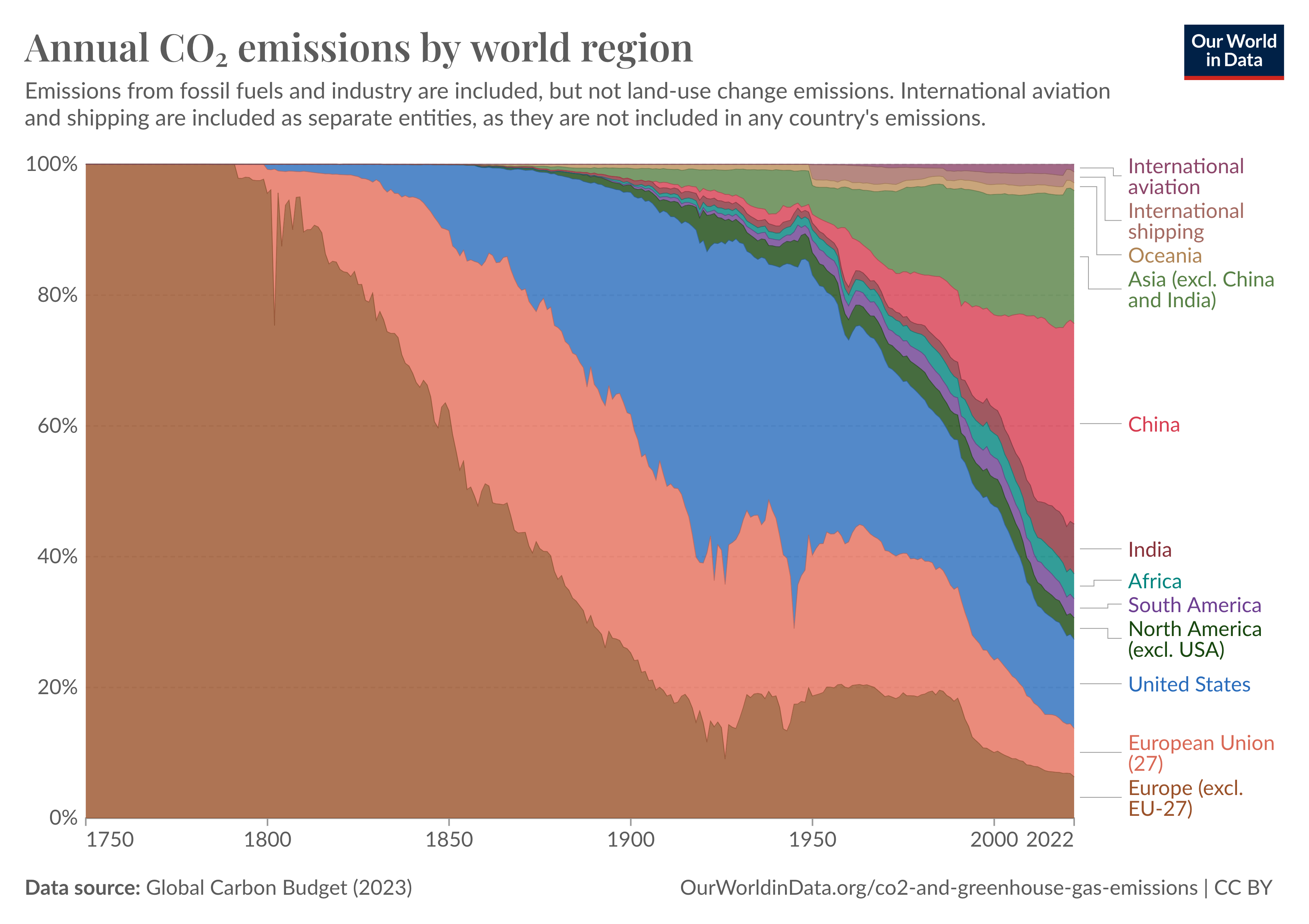
Annual CO_{2} emissions by region

Annual percentage change in CO_{2} emissions, 2022

CO_{2} emissions per capita

== See also ==
- List of countries by carbon dioxide emissions per capita
- List of countries by greenhouse gas emissions
- List of countries by greenhouse gas emissions per capita
- List of countries by carbon intensity of GDP
- List of countries by renewable electricity production
- List of locations and entities by greenhouse gas emissions
- United Nations | Sustainable Development Goal 13 - Climate action
