= List of countries by greenhouse gas emissions per capita =

2025 worldwide greenhouse gas (GHG) emissions per capita and by region. The width of each bar corresponds to the region's population size, and the height shows the emissions per capita. Therefore, the total area of each rectangle represents the total emissions for that specific region. The color of the area indicates the year-over-year growth of total emissions. In 2025, worldwide GHG emissions totaled 54.1 Gt CO₂eq across a global population of 8.18 billion.

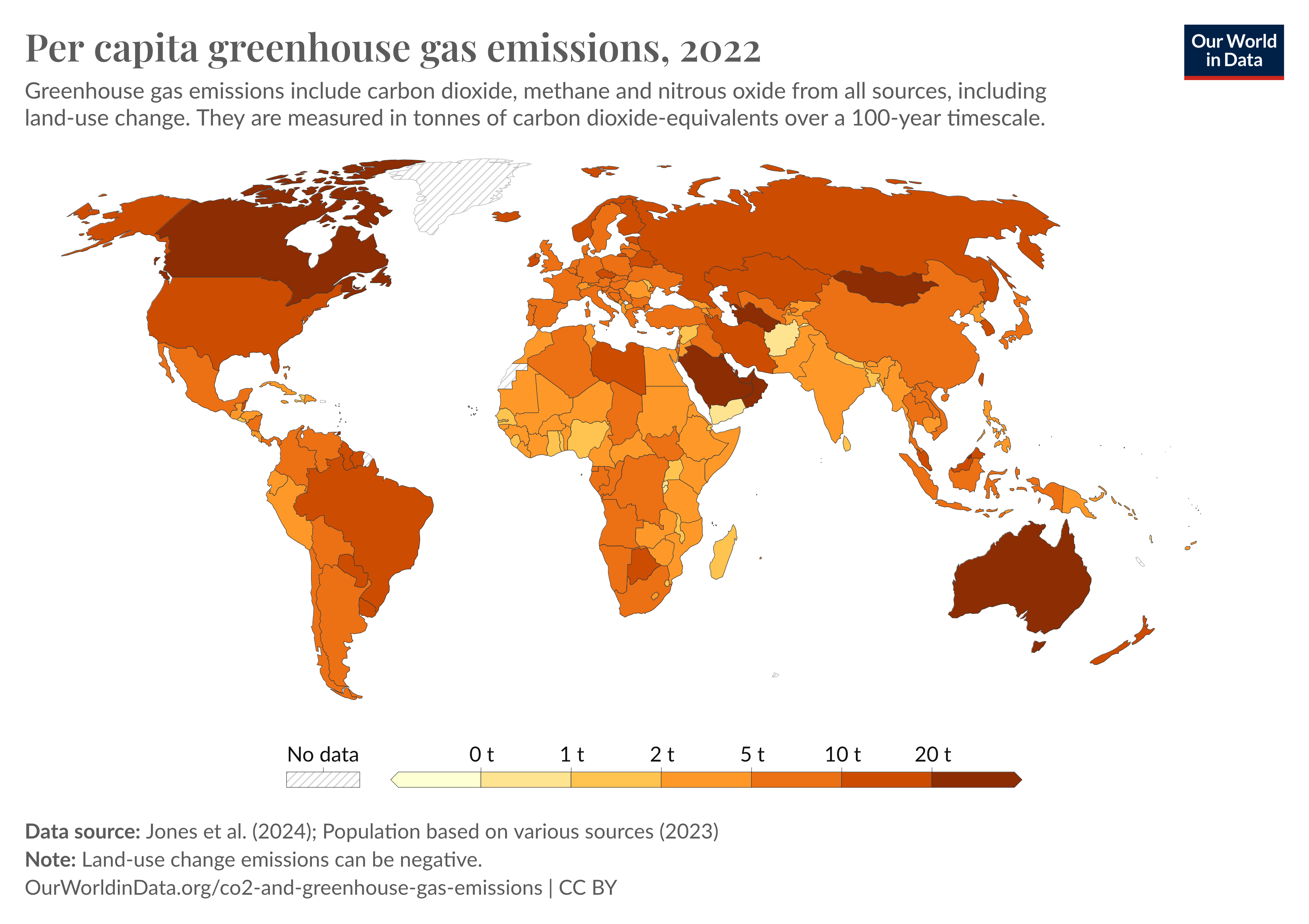
Per capita annual GHG emissions, including agriculture and land use change, measured in carbon dioxide-equivalents over a 100-year timescale.

This is a list of sovereign states and territories by per capita greenhouse gas emissions due to certain forms of human activity, based on the EDGAR database created by European Commission. The following table lists the 1970, 1990, 2000, 2010, 2020, 2021, 2022, and 2023 annual per capita GHG (Note: Greenhouse gases (GHG) constitute a group of gases contributing to global warming and climate change. The Kyoto Protocol, an environmental agreement adopted by many of the parties to the United Nations Framework Convention on Climate Change (UNFCCC) in 1997 to curb global warming, nowadays covers seven greenhouse gases: the non-fluorinated gases: carbon dioxide (CO_{2}), methane (CH_{4}), nitrous oxide (N_{2}O), the fluorinated gases: hydrofluorocarbons (HFCs), perfluorocarbons (PFCs), sulphur hexafluoride (SF_{6}), nitrogen trifluoride (NF_{3}).; Converting them to carbon dioxide (or CO_{2}) equivalents makes it possible to compare them and to determine their individual and total contributions to global warming.) emissions estimates (in metric tons of CO_{2} equivalent per year). The data include carbon dioxide (CO_{2}), methane (CH₄), and nitrous oxide (N_{2}O) emissions from all sources, including agriculture and land use change. They are measured in carbon dioxide-equivalents over a 100-year timescale. (Note: Carbon dioxide is the most important greenhouse gas, but not the only one. To capture all greenhouse gas emissions, researchers express them in carbon dioxide-equivalents (CO_{2}eq). This takes all greenhouse gases into account, not just CO_{2}. To express all greenhouse gases in carbon dioxide-equivalents (CO_{2}eq), each one is weighted by its "global warming potential" (GWP) value. GWP measures the amount of warming a gas creates compared to CO_{2}. CO_{2} is given a GWP value of one. If a gas had a GWP of 10 then one kilogram of that gas would generate ten times the warming effect as one kilogram of CO_{2}. Carbon dioxide-equivalents are calculated for each gas by multiplying the mass of emissions of a specific greenhouse gas by its GWP factor. This warming can be stated over different timescales. To calculate CO_{2}eq over 100 years, we’d multiply each gas by its GWP over a 100-year timescale (GWP100). Total greenhouse gas emissions – measured in CO_{2}eq – are then calculated by summing each gas’ CO_{2}eq value.)

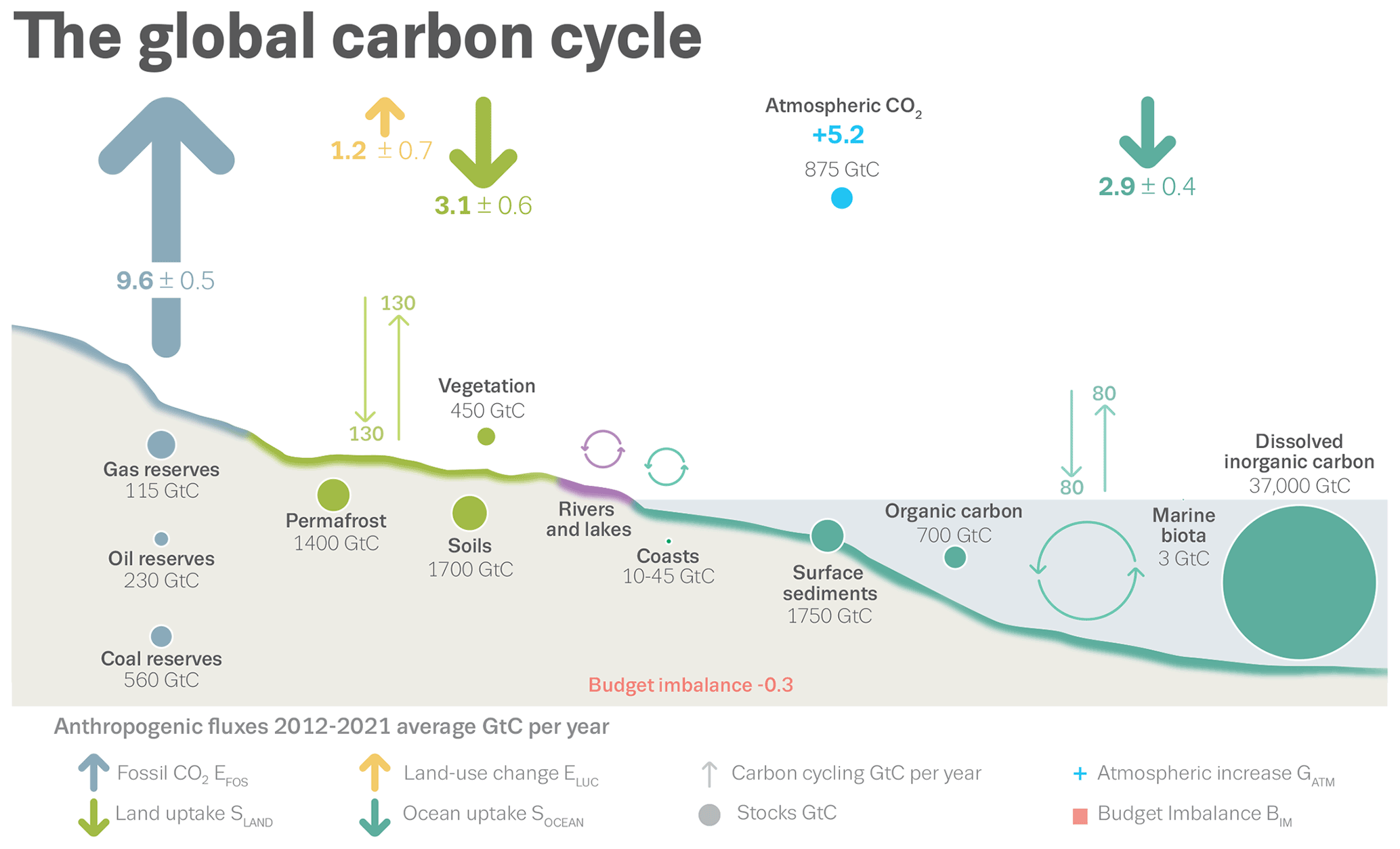
The Intergovernmental Panel on Climate Change (IPCC) 6th assessment report finds that the "Agriculture, Forestry and Other Land Use (AFOLU)" sector on average, accounted for 13–21% of global total anthropogenic GHG emissions in the period 2010–2019. Land use change drivers net AFOLU CO_{2} emission fluxes, with deforestation being responsible for 45% of total AFOLU emissions. In addition to being a net carbon sink and source of GHG emissions, land plays an important role in climate through albedo effects, evapotranspiration, and aerosol loading through emissions of volatile organic compounds. The IPCC report finds that the LULUCF sector offers significant near-term mitigation potential while providing food, wood and other renewable resources as well as biodiversity conservation. Mitigation measures in forests and other natural ecosystems provide the largest share of the LULUCF mitigation potential between 2020 and 2050. Among various LULUCF activities, reducing deforestation has the largest potential to reduce anthropogenic GHG emissions, followed by carbon sequestration in agriculture and ecosystem restoration including afforestation and reforestation. Land use change emissions can be negative. (Note: Global Carbon Project (2022) The rate of build-up of GHG in the atmosphere can be reduced by taking advantage of the fact that atmospheric CO_{2} can accumulate as carbon in vegetation and soils in terrestrial ecosystems. Under the United Nations Framework Convention on Climate Change any process, activity or mechanism which removes a greenhouse gas (GHG) from the atmosphere is referred to as a "sink". Human activities impact terrestrial sinks, through land use, land-use change and forestry (LULUCF), consequently, the exchange of CO_{2} (carbon cycle) between the terrestrial biosphere and the atmosphere is altered.)

According to Science for Policy report in 2024 by the Joint Research Centre (JRC – the European Commission’s science and knowledge service) and International Energy Agency (IEA), global per-capita GHG emissions in 2023 increased by 0.9% to reach 6.59 t_{CO_{2}eq}/cap, a value still 0.9% lower than in 2019 (6.65 t_{CO_{2}eq}/cap), but have increased by about 7.3% from 6.14 t_{CO_{2}eq}/cap to 6.59 t_{CO_{2}eq}/cap between 1990 and 2023.

However, the main disadvantage of measuring total national emissions is that it does not take population size into account. China has the largest CO_{2} and GHG emissions in the world, but also the second largest population. Some argue that for a fair comparison, emissions should be analyzed in terms of the amount of CO_{2} and GHG per capita.

Considering GHG per capita emissions in 2023, China's levels (11.11) are almost two-thirds those of the United States (17.61) and almost a sixth of those of Palau (65,29) – the country with the highest emissions of GHG per capita in 2023.

Measures of territorial-based emissions, also known as production-based emissions, do not account for emissions embedded in global trade, where emissions may be imported or exported in the form of traded goods, as it only reports emissions emitted within geographical boundaries. Accordingly, a proportion of the CO_{2} produced and reported in Asia and Africa is for the production of goods consumed in Europe and North America.

According to the review of the scientific literature conducted by the Intergovernmental Panel on Climate Change (IPCC), carbon dioxide is the most important anthropogenic greenhouse gas by warming contribution. The European Union is at the forefront of international efforts to reduce greenhouse gas emissions and thus safeguard the planet's climate. Greenhouse gases (GHG) – primarily carbon dioxide but also others, including methane and chlorofluorocarbons – trap heat in the atmosphere, leading to global warming. Higher temperatures then act on the climate, with varying effects. For example, dry regions might become drier while, at the poles, the ice caps are melting, causing higher sea levels. In 2016, the global average temperature was already 1.1 °C above pre-industrial levels.

== Per capita GHG emissions by country/territory ==
The data in the following table is extracted from EDGAR – Emissions Database for Global Atmospheric Research. Sorting is alphabetical by country code, according to ISO 3166-1 alpha-3.

=== GHG emissions per capita (kg_{CO_{2}}eq/year) ===
Country/Territory/Region/Group	GHG emissions per capita									% of Global Average	Change (1990=100%)
Country/Territory/Region/Group	1970	1990	2000	2010	2020	2021	2022	2023	2025	2025	2025
Country/Territory/Region/Group	kg_{CO_{2}}eq	kg_{CO_{2}}eq	kg_{CO_{2}}eq	kg_{CO_{2}}eq	kg_{CO_{2}}eq	kg_{CO_{2}}eq	kg_{CO_{2}}eq	kg_{CO_{2}}eq	kg_{CO_{2}}eq	%	%
Aruba	621.59	3539.58	3828.66	5196.58	4529.96	4964.50	4986.94	5199.05	5132.02	77.573%	44.99% ▲
Afghanistan	1387.50	1025.51	692.54	935.21	700.21	710.36	719.31	724.74	753.59	11.391%	−26.52% ▼
Angola	2803.67	2624.19	4076.62	2978.33	1878.92	1900.31	1920.97	1874.90	1839.16	27.800%	−29.92% ▼
Anguilla	523.98	948.24	1615.38	1969.02	1703.66	1681.62	1671.23	1638.17	1804.25	27.272%	90.27% ▲
Albania	3824.44	3502.46	2299.75	2737.00	2708.11	2851.65	2650.84	2603.89	2603.83	39.358%	−25.66% ▼
Curaçao	104950.61	19385.78	44558.23	30081.05	13114.85	14234.27	14664.36	15253.88	8955.86	135.372%	−53.80% ▼
United Arab Emirates	126395.53	42735.55	37159.59	25356.19	25407.05	25859.40	26601.03	26290.68	26740.23	404.191%	−37.43% ▼
Argentina	9156.88	7754.32	7778.72	8040.67	7631.49	8006.58	8091.75	7829.33	7456.02	112.701%	−3.85% ▼
Armenia	5018.52	6871.49	1935.89	2434.32	3400.72	3629.72	3525.35	3687.08	3663.49	55.375%	−46.69% ▼
Antigua and Barbuda	2360.28	3692.73	2693.61	3664.18	3247.21	3500.46	3479.16	3597.74	3725.89	56.319%	0.90% ▲
Australia	24529.27	27010.45	28664.43	27332.79	23016.28	22595.92	21887.54	21753.71	21523.71	325.341%	−20.31% ▼
Austria	9554.09	10416.59	10349.63	10574.80	8798.85	9172.16	8548.74	8248.10	7905.38	119.494%	−24.11% ▼
Azerbaijan	6315.80	9366.85	4906.68	4975.89	5418.40	5598.41	5757.54	6061.08	5527.75	83.555%	−40.99% ▼
Burundi	576.03	534.07	455.36	472.29	505.61	555.45	551.97	540.21	545.57	8.247%	2.15% ▲
Belgium	17337.09	14045.83	14705.21	12764.22	9967.13	10262.46	9587.54	9053.55	8926.19	134.924%	−36.45% ▼
Benin	818.09	774.72	875.93	1263.73	1456.14	1286.64	1299.97	1273.02	1480.84	22.384%	91.15% ▲
Burkina Faso	1150.29	1274.88	1213.01	1532.84	1378.95	1565.08	1539.20	1516.65	1428.92	21.599%	12.08% ▲
Bangladesh	1911.76	1225.13	1109.67	1315.34	1481.72	1570.91	1607.63	1608.37	1353.20	20.454%	10.45% ▲
Bulgaria	10757.28	11699.42	7807.57	8418.61	7717.84	8710.09	9385.24	7855.80	7293.55	110.245%	−37.66% ▼
Bahrain	86507.28	58609.94	56553.23	38919.29	37216.30	36346.19	35095.72	35251.03	36626.69	553.630%	−37.51% ▼
Bahamas	9208.73	5098.54	4223.07	4412.78	4402.23	4753.22	4728.30	4916.75	4543.05	68.670%	−10.90% ▼
Bosnia and Herzegovina	4362.60	7350.39	5257.51	7613.37	8702.96	8670.87	8677.10	8459.85	7722.12	116.723%	5.06% ▲
Belarus	9918.21	13695.30	8054.94	10020.45	9408.02	9438.67	9256.04	9005.94	9434.40	142.605%	−31.11% ▼
Belize	2241.78	2519.49	2031.64	2497.93	2093.79	2143.42	2153.16	2186.10	2176.27	32.895%	−13.62% ▼
Bermuda	3083.89	4625.90	2774.22	5306.37	5674.20	5992.93	6010.83	6313.97	4782.26	72.286%	3.38% ▲
Bolivia	5994.77	4320.35	3523.96	4126.50	4159.41	4450.67	4506.61	4585.43	4795.10	72.480%	10.99% ▲
Brazil	3665.35	4496.60	5128.46	5739.33	5685.88	6013.21	5993.88	5965.80	5929.06	89.621%	31.86% ▲
Barbados	2094.87	3302.68	3111.99	3650.64	3006.89	3296.66	3304.98	3422.30	3468.06	52.421%	5.01% ▲
Brunei	21447.75	22773.40	25582.82	25797.37	28286.76	27466.17	26183.53	26430.31	24394.83	368.739%	7.12% ▲
Bhutan	2354.24	2333.40	2487.53	2839.83	3669.76	3776.03	3772.11	3780.32	3884.14	58.711%	66.46% ▲
Botswana	4859.91	6664.82	6113.13	4916.66	4348.41	4699.89	4965.03	5012.92	4862.30	73.496%	−27.05% ▼
Central African Republic	890.61	2567.67	2435.48	2445.70	2539.67	2513.80	2537.86	2382.36	2413.37	36.479%	−6.01% ▼
Canada	21738.98	21013.22	23112.25	21207.28	18932.73	19203.35	19487.61	19391.50	19516.40	295.000%	−7.12% ▼
Switzerland and Liechtenstein	8318.16	8189.82	7477.48	7023.28	5187.95	5352.36	4956.50	4911.42	4740.25	71.651%	−42.12% ▼
Chile	5272.15	4393.97	5531.74	6043.17	6717.55	6734.25	6693.07	6440.59	6090.51	92.061%	38.61% ▲
China	2467.42	3306.23	4085.67	8283.01	10177.19	10623.61	10587.45	11113.30	11106.88	167.886%	235.94% ▲
Ivory Coast	1215.88	837.55	986.99	957.89	1127.19	1175.21	1169.86	1141.97	1424.60	21.533%	70.09% ▲
Cameroon	1135.96	2547.66	1988.47	1516.71	1493.76	1461.25	1447.60	1408.54	1349.34	20.396%	−47.04% ▼
Democratic Republic of the Congo	555.78	735.49	568.98	481.45	567.49	565.71	583.80	571.58	545.16	8.240%	−25.88% ▼
Congo	1767.87	4448.50	6710.98	5010.38	4401.31	3964.78	3965.08	3862.15	3779.29	57.126%	−15.04% ▼
Cook Islands	1286.60	2845.00	4113.49	5194.95	7798.38	8387.85	8809.64	9077.54	6826.55	103.186%	139.95% ▲
Colombia	3839.73	3929.82	3800.21	3761.33	3912.82	4114.13	4185.28	4370.68	3975.39	60.090%	1.16% ▲
Comoros	964.49	800.88	769.87	762.07	887.86	871.16	835.38	822.64	917.67	13.871%	14.58% ▲
Cape Verde	844.91	624.35	1213.06	1904.38	2097.01	2113.09	2166.17	2094.42	1641.41	24.811%	162.90% ▲
Costa Rica	3122.08	3110.14	2789.93	2982.93	2849.24	3083.02	3105.30	3185.33	3356.26	50.731%	7.91% ▲
Cuba	5254.84	5848.56	4381.07	4179.33	3437.72	3378.50	3323.79	3423.73	3005.25	45.426%	−48.62% ▼
Cayman Islands	3918.08	5161.05	3612.86	4913.96	5256.08	5680.63	5707.17	5911.18	6340.96	95.847%	22.86% ▲
Cyprus	4673.45	7066.65	8614.52	8502.41	7728.10	7906.57	8232.33	8380.40	7385.81	111.640%	4.52% ▲
Czech Republic	22449.60	19338.04	15406.98	13793.69	11094.66	11607.33	11656.41	10766.62	9675.24	146.246%	−49.97% ▼
Germany	16873.88	15620.58	12705.93	11651.26	9084.03	9486.48	9225.88	8258.76	8009.75	121.071%	−48.72% ▼
Djibouti	6154.26	3123.78	2600.34	2357.31	2084.64	2118.75	2064.12	2048.42	2276.81	34.415%	−27.11% ▼
Dominica	453.15	1120.78	1651.73	1965.01	1795.19	1871.82	1901.06	1933.15	1976.66	29.878%	76.36% ▲
Denmark	16295.69	13430.54	13025.36	11379.74	7514.02	7723.14	7397.94	7131.18	5835.08	88.200%	−56.55% ▼
Dominican Republic	2132.80	2404.92	3288.78	3465.64	3871.77	4119.09	4098.59	4234.14	4451.87	67.292%	85.12% ▲
Algeria	3930.50	5230.33	5077.45	5119.95	5564.59	5775.56	5903.69	5683.88	5819.22	87.960%	11.26% ▲
Ecuador	2247.92	3716.78	3607.30	4526.69	3723.34	3906.29	3969.90	4082.79	3798.19	57.411%	2.19% ▲
Egypt	1719.67	2571.96	2804.58	3473.12	2979.98	3174.13	3132.46	3107.45	3506.64	53.005%	36.34% ▲
Eritrea	2253.69	1501.62	1600.38	1260.04	1159.06	1148.85	1121.50	1103.19	1049.53	15.864%	−30.11% ▼
Western Sahara	2890.15	1857.69	1790.63	1287.49	1002.94	1062.65	1087.67	1069.99	1076.87	16.277%	−42.03% ▼
Spain and Andorra	5605.40	7574.81	9696.02	8020.00	6250.38	6643.75	6567.43	6152.24	6332.34	95.716%	−16.40% ▼
Estonia	18734.10	28406.61	14778.43	18837.01	11157.57	11783.80	12040.47	11143.50	10856.25	164.097%	−61.78% ▼
Ethiopia	1857.38	1307.03	1079.20	1363.84	1507.58	1428.31	1413.06	1408.25	1510.81	22.837%	15.59% ▲
Finland	12564.83	14455.53	14211.24	15169.99	9434.76	9369.11	8584.72	7711.36	8483.27	128.229%	−41.31% ▼
Fiji	2789.02	3031.56	3520.16	3640.02	3342.91	3377.52	3535.03	3610.40	3632.42	54.906%	19.82% ▲
Falkland Islands (Note: The Falkland Islands with only 3,500 inhabitants in a cold climate has many severely degraded peatlands.)	77832.14	82849.34	53686.22	57504.28	56311.17	56769.63	56854.75	57463.78	60525.67	914.874%	−26.94% ▼
France and Monaco	12521.69	9357.55	9063.20	8104.98	6061.23	6511.82	6287.30	5805.59	5644.51	85.319%	−39.68% ▼
Faroe Islands	1149.99	976.75	973.64	960.40	1016.13	1019.99	992.29	994.12	1995.29	30.160%	104.28% ▲
Gabon	11538.26	21421.29	22664.06	12783.82	9185.09	8581.54	8827.48	9374.54	8418.01	127.242%	−60.70% ▼
United Kingdom	15369.38	13301.23	11722.35	9328.87	5934.63	6198.53	5973.22	5545.19	5447.69	82.344%	−59.04% ▼
Georgia	6389.97	7739.00	2401.53	2835.44	4449.43	4674.96	4830.98	4933.74	5090.55	76.946%	−34.22% ▼
Ghana	815.45	709.78	806.27	972.97	1475.73	1497.75	1505.56	1477.60	1509.56	22.818%	112.68% ▲
Gibraltar	2866.93	5419.50	11491.10	14905.05	18919.01	19131.61	19955.12	20353.50	7989.18	120.760%	47.42% ▲
Guinea	1186.62	1291.10	1286.43	1713.91	1915.00	1912.92	1931.67	1928.52	1939.61	29.318%	50.23% ▲
Guadeloupe	1289.08	2417.11	2057.50	2875.00	3139.72	3143.28	3144.03	3263.90	3245.38	49.055%	34.27% ▲
The Gambia	1569.78	1035.02	1022.02	1161.21	838.55	778.55	790.39	756.73	731.64	11.059%	−29.31% ▼
Guinea-Bissau	1067.14	1635.76	1613.82	1683.40	1445.28	1430.71	1430.85	1398.08	1503.87	22.732%	−8.06% ▼
Equatorial Guinea	407.84	433.31	19551.13	15755.32	6639.88	5939.83	5458.64	4519.16	4617.19	69.791%	965.56% ▲
Greece	5213.89	9665.41	10864.65	9745.77	6458.44	6597.37	6623.91	6290.62	6496.98	98.205%	−32.78% ▼
Grenada	552.67	963.37	1019.58	1617.87	1621.43	1752.74	1732.32	1805.47	2281.00	34.478%	136.77% ▲
Greenland	1231.26	1102.80	1057.45	12641.02	10426.13	10755.87	11242.18	11355.52	11753.05	177.653%	965.75% ▲
Guatemala	1492.35	1414.44	1859.63	1928.76	2194.25	2315.41	2277.58	2325.81	2036.86	30.788%	44.00% ▲
French Guiana	2345.64	3162.16	1996.34	1994.81	1789.65	1774.69	1736.13	1758.86	1645.88	24.878%	−47.95% ▼
Guyana	7116.59	5059.31	6242.26	6518.83	9314.45	9255.38	10369.51	10200.48	12981.64	196.224%	156.59% ▲
Hong Kong	2999.21	6779.62	7000.25	6707.24	5368.63	5326.66	4975.31	5226.77	4849.27	73.299%	−28.47% ▼
Honduras	2135.50	1841.25	1753.92	2238.35	2091.88	2178.01	2206.90	2255.03	2404.81	36.350%	30.61% ▲
Croatia	6449.45	7002.87	5648.60	6350.59	6083.65	6198.07	6141.65	6180.75	6788.12	102.606%	−3.074% ▼
Haiti	1319.43	1031.80	1129.12	1189.56	1187.31	1167.06	1162.58	1162.69	1007.49	15.229%	−2.36% ▼
Hungary	8786.95	9322.84	7581.31	6818.10	6843.32	7000.12	6729.09	6403.23	6039.78	91.294%	−35.22% ▼
Indonesia	1796.77	2188.63	2660.93	3224.38	3858.38	3918.73	4155.09	4287.44	4772.29	72.135%	118.05% ▲
India	1432.16	1589.49	1752.48	2232.06	2482.38	2633.32	2761.21	2900.42	3105.05	46.934%	95.35% ▲
Ireland	13424.62	16039.79	19348.93	14403.21	12123.27	12447.34	12168.19	11577.60	11169.63	168.834%	−30.36% ▼
Iran	7740.44	5917.45	7743.65	10300.22	10639.03	11050.32	11302.33	11643.08	12905.81	195.077%	118.10% ▲
Iraq	10470.22	9847.13	7143.44	6845.99	7989.38	7880.19	8352.30	8084.34	9074.69	137.168%	−7.84% ▼
Iceland	15723.24	17298.61	13949.83	15522.14	12233.42	12597.64	12560.53	11885.86	11432.46	172.807%	−33.91% ▼
Israel and State of Palestine	18282.61	6334.05	7473.90	7226.48	5566.35	5484.99	5541.97	5364.14	5000.00	75.577%	−21.06% ▼
Italy, San Marino and Holy See	7359.42	8957.34	9486.96	8460.66	6248.03	6888.82	6839.87	6359.09	6046.06	91.389%	−32.50% ▼
Jamaica	4920.04	3794.04	4492.81	3168.62	2459.37	2648.94	2618.38	2787.88	3289.84	49.727%	−13.29% ▼
Jordan	2083.43	3408.39	3865.30	3641.38	2969.48	3051.54	3058.47	3189.58	3726.91	56.334%	9.35% ▲
Japan	9685.72	10578.70	10907.85	10301.09	9239.48	9371.02	8811.47	8310.95	8552.24	129.271%	−19.16% ▼
Kazakhstan	20417.57	20980.01	11762.06	19385.46	16000.42	17049.80	16774.72	16601.03	18241.80	275.733%	−13.05% ▼
Kenya	2020.90	1638.72	1312.61	1898.69	2026.89	1858.50	1859.54	1881.29	1814.57	27.428%	10.73% ▲
Kyrgyzstan	7742.53	7631.50	2217.01	2601.62	3174.61	3351.68	3316.89	3320.82	3664.23	55.387%	−51.99% ▼
Cambodia	3657.21	2196.52	1869.50	2282.98	2782.41	2842.35	2772.71	2805.57	3249.65	49.120%	47.95% ▲
Kiribati	540.95	461.20	620.78	839.84	947.97	974.10	1003.11	1017.00	862.42	13.036%	86.99% ▲
Saint Kitts and Nevis	1302.63	1466.30	2072.94	2820.06	2491.59	2730.07	2852.65	3008.17	3028.40	45.776%	106.53% ▲
South Korea	3094.69	7573.43	11364.82	13399.80	13378.90	13751.97	12897.79	12583.64	13329.54	201.482%	76.00% ▲
Kuwait	106373.45	24072.74	42938.85	42017.19	34635.78	36184.49	37399.68	37447.76	38483.93	581.703%	59.87% ▲
Laos	2568.12	1884.27	1833.62	2363.84	4812.29	5341.29	5446.45	5645.89	5203.15	78.648%	176.14% ▲
Lebanon	2946.63	2871.48	5613.65	5740.25	4732.35	3981.12	4079.52	4266.35	3688.94	55.760%	28.47% ▲
Liberia	1107.21	815.72	723.25	805.71	853.43	843.89	851.07	824.67	819.88	12.393%	0.51% ▲
Libya	64281.68	19621.80	17127.88	17185.09	9663.98	13357.00	13044.00	13912.95	16714.94	252.654%	−14.81% ▼
Saint Lucia	738.23	1064.24	1359.96	1670.80	2188.87	2357.73	2360.49	2465.94	2540.02	38.394%	138.67% ▲
Sri Lanka	1528.24	1217.12	1390.81	1540.72	1887.52	1918.73	1776.71	1806.47	1445.08	21.843%	18.73% ▲
Lesotho	1844.76	1321.93	1423.86	1363.41	1045.90	1074.83	1114.11	1080.08	1299.02	19.635%	−1.73% ▼
Lithuania	9439.49	12637.50	5265.93	7275.10	7951.23	7920.83	7356.30	7350.27	7126.50	107.720%	−43.61% ▼
Luxembourg	60371.96	33830.62	22457.88	24023.16	14631.17	15070.47	13127.89	12537.37	11135.35	168.316%	−67.08% ▼
Latvia	7264.63	10164.08	4274.89	5942.82	6153.72	6327.75	5962.07	5948.69	5983.27	90.440%	−41.13% ▼
Macao	1349.35	2927.77	3597.85	3352.49	4555.50	4389.32	4501.60	4573.33	2795.80	42.260%	−4.51% ▼
Morocco	1390.55	1706.71	1963.54	2486.29	2783.27	2914.38	2807.70	2781.97	2899.21	43.823%	69.87% ▲
Moldova	6504.28	8566.30	2349.84	2805.14	3064.12	3297.28	3245.98	3405.18	2817.01	42.580%	−67.12% ▼
Madagascar	3080.14	2062.43	1639.45	1337.96	1145.83	1161.38	1141.17	1107.31	1061.47	16.045%	−48.53% ▼
Maldives	181.17	608.15	2508.48	3219.27	5889.66	6091.60	6327.32	6446.66	4211.70	63.662%	592.54% ▲
Mexico	3951.63	5158.46	5564.77	5710.91	4809.75	4952.97	5023.37	5148.11	5079.03	76.772%	−1.54% ▼
North Macedonia	7134.87	7216.04	5608.10	5670.29	4929.49	4902.08	5266.29	5440.21	4718.87	71.328%	−34.61% ▼
Mali	1969.05	1485.87	1501.61	1772.99	2144.16	2174.31	2083.86	2052.23	2126.04	32.136%	43.08% ▲
Malta	2469.06	6834.07	5907.75	7117.36	4554.98	4554.83	4844.75	4654.15	5109.66	77.235%	−25.23% ▼
Myanmar	2633.52	1658.08	1805.34	2160.56	2210.24	2156.91	2123.83	2049.24	2337.84	35.338%	41.00% ▲
Mongolia	12317.07	11783.43	10487.95	14102.88	20418.38	20699.37	20315.65	25144.06	31194.15	471.514%	164.73% ▲
Mozambique	1046.92	667.36	600.44	607.65	882.51	960.62	1007.64	966.47	984.17	14.876%	47.47% ▲
Mauritania	4916.82	3275.15	3372.37	3157.47	3345.62	3287.37	3266.17	3199.47	3292.43	49.767%	0.53% ▲
Martinique	1117.27	2507.92	2143.85	2868.61	2330.62	2697.18	3029.53	3164.73	3112.61	47.049%	24.11% ▲
Mauritius	995.93	1745.49	2735.55	3992.32	4369.91	4591.72	4671.41	4842.76	5366.73	81.121%	207.46% ▲
Malawi	518.56	622.22	715.21	754.25	852.80	883.41	867.27	894.30	924.66	13.977%	48.61% ▲
Malaysia	4193.55	5118.89	7071.66	9126.15	8964.79	9005.57	9367.52	9534.03	9650.39	145.870%	88.53% ▲
Namibia	8288.24	4632.42	4391.45	4572.16	4174.18	4414.39	4553.91	4503.91	4278.79	64.676%	−7.63% ▼
New Caledonia	12833.74	11358.84	11779.81	14921.93	24067.48	20611.57	21352.11	22270.09	22565.56	341.089%	98.66% ▲
Niger	2453.35	1343.23	1428.44	1419.58	1543.28	1565.15	1575.43	1569.56	1644.90	24.863%	22.46% ▲
Nigeria	3254.47	2921.24	3312.74	2180.92	1849.32	1829.30	1753.16	1732.02	1574.76	23.803%	−46.09% ▼
Nicaragua	3743.99	2446.34	2587.77	2692.50	2982.91	3048.09	3089.19	3122.18	2918.99	44.122%	19.32% ▲
Netherlands	13760.80	14913.45	14132.27	13141.66	9923.63	10140.32	9328.36	8701.06	8638.70	130.578%	−42.07% ▼
Norway	13922.23	12872.11	12641.34	12806.53	10484.93	10528.33	10310.80	10120.82	9267.20	140.078%	−28.01% ▼
Nepal	2079.12	1621.55	1444.71	1472.76	1812.89	1811.11	1807.70	1821.10	1355.37	20.487%	−16.42% ▼
New Zealand	20249.40	20972.84	21059.08	19383.70	17536.34	17346.11	16962.77	16994.92	14677.62	221.859%	−30.02% ▼
Oman	20504.73	19291.62	22954.27	25126.31	21984.44	22743.48	23348.72	23427.03	25122.24	379.734%	30.22% ▲
Pakistan	1723.94	1871.23	2016.61	2213.19	2523.48	2597.98	2483.75	2425.29	2342.05	35.401%	25.16% ▲
Panama	4069.26	2851.46	3224.72	4098.95	3685.64	3958.88	4181.09	4755.68	4348.78	65.734%	52.51% ▲
Peru	2860.90	2045.88	2246.93	2611.67	2432.50	2611.56	2707.41	2732.46	2976.51	44.991%	45.49% ▲
Philippines	2436.14	1633.50	1773.36	1732.33	2090.64	2159.97	2165.84	2237.15	2296.74	34.716%	40.60% ▲
Palau (Note: Palau, which has only 22,000 inhabitants derives half its GDP from its 89,000 tourists and much of the transport and imported food are used by them.)	188715.09	155331.00	116877.14	107735.74	59539.31	63169.63	63571.86	65289.25	68121.12	1029.683%	−56.147% ▼
Papua New Guinea	769.93	942.57	1090.27	919.68	1098.19	1036.42	1045.10	1040.13	1322.58	19.991%	40.32% ▲
Poland	14837.27	13512.28	10761.59	10881.15	9949.61	10703.44	10524.94	9668.69	9282.11	140.303%	−31.31% ▼
Puerto Rico	11604.14	6181.63	7334.61	4343.16	4018.55	4082.97	4085.75	4420.47	4180.28	63.187%	−32.38% ▼
North Korea	6853.23	8261.25	4415.28	4017.11	3743.93	3198.38	3288.65	3446.17	3509.98	53.055%	−57.51% ▼
Portugal	3402.44	5879.35	7810.38	6415.48	5622.49	5478.61	5539.77	5240.72	5285.65	79.895%	−10.10% ▼
Paraguay	4205.61	4937.34	4692.28	5862.28	6023.05	6076.29	5753.16	5691.08	5675.02	85.781%	14.94% ▲
French Polynesia	1747.80	4777.97	3454.90	4081.98	4164.12	4321.01	4529.57	4659.51	4655.10	70.364%	−2.57% ▼
Qatar	214940.09	55172.46	101302.61	52675.43	50200.32	50397.61	50005.15	52565.05	54833.61	828.836%	−0.61% ▼
Réunion	1115.29	1895.69	3176.56	3574.84	3230.16	3214.03	3195.53	3188.54	3323.24	50.232%	75.31% ▲
Romania	8493.96	10275.07	5909.29	5744.99	5713.04	6003.44	5778.50	5539.11	5133.69	77.598%	−50.04% ▼
Russia	13242.54	20775.37	14270.11	15390.80	16660.88	17738.97	18275.93	18658.97	18052.46	272.871%	−13.11% ▼
Rwanda	1127.11	770.02	496.33	559.26	575.23	574.58	546.84	536.73	659.68	9.971%	−14.33% ▼
Saudi Arabia	13787.57	14487.73	16866.52	21991.97	21119.88	21302.23	21984.45	22173.94	22658.42	342.493%	56.40% ▲
Serbia and Montenegro	5319.06	8421.82	6518.79	7552.63	7653.62	7466.29	7445.89	7275.92	7363.10	111.297%	−12.57% ▼
Sudan and South Sudan	2778.57	2360.68	2826.49	2815.99	2461.18	2331.13	2267.77	2231.50	2010.57	30.391%	−14.83% ▼
Senegal	1824.12	1316.22	1372.77	1502.51	1567.82	1605.96	1588.00	1550.15	1707.01	25.802%	29.69% ▲
Singapore	3590.98	11203.74	14625.83	11440.42	11469.06	11827.17	11895.21	12216.76	11826.31	178.760%	5.56% ▲
Saint Helena, Ascension and Tristan da Cunha	1169.36	2404.02	2785.53	3512.95	4621.65	4848.15	5184.56	5317.76	5278.61	79.789%	119.57% ▲
Solomon Islands	949.29	983.65	1002.66	1105.87	1005.27	1021.73	1043.91	1053.83	749.77	11.333%	−23.78% ▼
Sierra Leone	1090.76	932.68	784.67	879.73	824.22	910.32	826.96	812.28	941.85	14.237%	0.98% ▲
El Salvador	1502.04	1370.66	1766.28	1869.42	1731.10	1858.91	1913.05	1984.09	2334.70	35.290%	70.33% ▲
Somalia	5394.35	3456.87	3125.84	2486.74	2014.57	1944.45	1893.87	1846.38	1863.13	28.162%	−46.10% ▼
Saint Pierre and Miquelon	7596.39	15680.67	3738.63	6767.00	6742.52	6448.23	6601.35	6653.39	5566.05	84.133%	−64.50% ▼
São Tomé and Príncipe	460.27	723.04	828.36	1123.42	1194.83	1178.68	1289.76	1302.38	1068.06	16.144%	47.72% ▲
Suriname	5462.04	5720.12	5333.79	5406.51	6487.36	6425.75	6232.35	6324.40	5925.18	89.562%	3.58% ▲
Slovakia	12695.61	14227.76	9537.09	9221.46	7799.16	8582.38	8346.16	8220.23	6900.75	104.308%	−51.50% ▼
Slovenia	8848.25	10678.98	10267.36	10785.07	8561.37	8631.64	8248.36	7689.19	7869.40	118.950%	−26.31% ▼
Sweden	14219.46	8765.13	8513.37	7265.17	5141.71	5293.02	4889.30	4761.84	5310.59	80.272%	−39.41% ▼
Eswatini	4108.25	3737.24	3065.87	2315.79	2102.85	2143.02	2183.15	2179.95	2210.51	33.413%	−40.85% ▼
Seychelles	2483.51	4488.25	10166.86	10871.32	12690.05	12797.33	13420.55	13801.12	11084.35	167.545%	146.96% ▲
Syria	2463.34	5094.60	5176.78	4219.84	2142.19	2045.90	1964.53	1919.00	1897.47	28.681%	−62.76% ▼
Turks and Caicos Islands	798.87	793.79	1361.73	2702.49	2606.85	2846.33	2770.57	2901.44	5825.09	88.049%	633.83% ▲
Chad	2450.07	2879.96	3197.19	3934.24	5034.09	5100.01	5275.79	5372.16	5444.79	82.301%	89.06% ▲
Togo	890.88	873.16	965.41	1138.21	1144.69	1178.75	1192.37	1180.13	1161.88	17.562%	33.07% ▲
Thailand	3197.09	3835.90	4668.87	6079.27	6248.61	6179.50	6360.66	6331.18	5759.98	87.065%	50.16% ▲
Tajikistan	4867.92	4165.88	1690.11	1553.42	2220.65	2193.00	2155.01	2141.03	2344.31	35.435%	−43.73% ▼
Turkmenistan	13128.95	16641.31	13217.25	17464.94	16544.97	16076.59	16102.11	15734.05	19360.37	292.641%	16.34% ▲
East Timor	1072.20	689.86	1062.05	1925.34	1385.30	1357.99	1398.59	1362.65	1159.17	17.521%	68.03% ▲
Tonga	795.68	2045.69	2134.77	2293.57	2811.86	2877.26	2958.39	3027.49	2791.05	42.188%	36.44% ▲
Trinidad and Tobago	9617.81	13013.89	18509.24	36199.66	26502.21	25650.70	25219.29	24755.27	24034.60	363.294%	84.68% ▲
Tunisia	2069.71	2820.39	3260.96	3771.82	3376.99	3585.76	3498.73	3561.79	3636.97	54.975%	28.95% ▲
Turkey	2862.82	4111.41	4968.22	5729.02	6958.42	7390.87	7043.65	7100.72	7091.79	107.196%	72.49% ▲
Taiwan	3560.65	7221.64	11877.72	13574.71	13299.56	13726.65	13203.15	12850.49	12557.93	189.819%	73.89% ▲
Tanzania	1430.86	1125.51	1133.45	1168.81	1327.08	1346.37	1314.85	1309.43	1417.06	21.420%	25.90% ▲
Uganda	1154.14	865.68	807.84	1045.66	1063.87	1089.50	1056.48	1029.87	1071.46	16.196%	23.77% ▲
Ukraine	12893.75	18819.39	9306.51	8826.10	6598.37	6493.03	5017.96	5035.25	4936.65	74.620%	−73.77% ▼
Uruguay	10271.19	9406.20	10298.69	11503.60	11136.84	12142.41	11981.77	11801.05	12379.23	187.118%	31.61% ▲
United States	27619.18	24588.34	25545.28	21738.96	17112.45	17968.71	17986.66	17608.22	17533.03	265.020%	−28.69% ▼
Uzbekistan	6584.43	8039.28	6745.42	6743.29	5957.24	6250.34	6352.96	6231.31	6094.35	92.119%	−24.19% ▼
Saint Vincent and the Grenadines	505.15	716.99	859.36	1405.56	1229.64	1308.86	1312.34	1358.33	1636.60	24.738%	128.26% ▲
Venezuela	9190.22	8222.93	9074.70	8962.11	4109.94	4013.62	4240.50	4441.43	5091.15	76.955%	−38.09% ▼
British Virgin Islands	1609.10	1763.38	1925.13	3102.64	2435.15	2624.00	2636.43	2678.50	3098.19	46.831%	75.70% ▲
Vietnam	2067.91	1530.91	2046.48	3327.16	5057.10	4940.90	4727.08	5185.08	5329.20	80.553%	248.11% ▲
Vanuatu	3422.53	3221.38	2858.66	2866.52	2140.23	2145.88	2152.75	2148.12	1970.15	29.780%	−38.84% ▼
Samoa	1102.17	1814.31	2082.85	2519.67	2826.16	3055.11	3131.38	3167.37	2418.13	36.551%	33.28% ▲
Yemen	871.50	1451.89	1814.05	2244.23	1087.05	1081.51	1050.64	1000.12	1173.62	17.740%	−19.17% ▼
South Africa	10557.25	10835.75	9868.06	11291.68	9225.11	9281.14	8884.37	8614.20	8395.06	126.895%	−22.52% ▼
Zambia	2985.99	1928.71	1408.13	1362.45	1463.90	1468.63	1507.14	1495.36	1989.77	30.076%	3.17% ▲
Zimbabwe	4197.29	3373.04	2656.70	1951.07	1514.14	1599.03	1617.61	1648.74	2088.52	31.569%	−38.08% ▼
(United Nations) Global Average	6487.57	6140.34	5888.42	6585.82	6330.14	6548.49	6533.77	6594.13	6615.74	100.000%	7.74% ▲
European Union	11904.37	11607.11	10461.10	9614.18	7637.95	8062.23	7849.39	7264.10	7056.09	106.656%	−39.21% ▼

== See also ==
- List of countries by carbon dioxide emissions
- List of countries by carbon intensity of GDP
- List of countries by renewable electricity production
- United Nations | Sustainable Development Goal 13 – Climate action
