= List of countries by carbon intensity =

Carbon intensity of GDP measures CO2 emissions per GDP unit

World map of emission intensity (kg of CO_{2} per Intl$), 2018

The following list of countries by carbon intensity of GDP sorts countries by their emission intensity. Carbon intensity or emission intensity of GDP is a measure that evaluates the amount of carbon dioxide (CO_{2}) emissions produced per unit of GDP. It provides an indication of how efficiently an economy uses carbon-based resources to generate economic output. A lower carbon intensity indicates that less CO_{2} is emitted to produce a given level of economic output, indicating a more carbon-efficient economy.

== List ==
=== Countries ===
Countries by carbon intensity of GDP. Carbon intensity is measured by CO_{2} emissions in kilograms per International dollar (US dollar adjusted for purchasing power parity) of economic output. Data are for the year 2022.

Country	CO_{2} kg/$
North Korea	1.26
Trinidad and Tobago	0.92
Mongolia	0.85
Turkmenistan	0.73
Libya	0.69
Lesotho	0.66
Bahrain	0.64
South Africa	0.56
Kazakhstan	0.54
Syria	0.53
Venezuela	0.51
Kuwait	0.50
Lebanon	0.49
Ukraine	0.46
Russia	0.44
Iran	0.44
China	0.42
Laos	0.42
Bosnia and Herzegovina	0.42
Vietnam	0.41
Oman	0.41
Serbia	0.37
Saudi Arabia	0.36
Barbados	0.36
Zimbabwe	0.34
Iraq	0.34
Belarus	0.33
Bulgaria	0.33
Malaysia	0.33
Jamaica	0.32
Republic of the Congo	0.31
United Arab Emirates	0.31
Canada	0.31
Uzbekistan	0.31
Cambodia	0.31
Kyrgyzstan	0.30
Algeria	0.30
Australia	0.29
Mauritania	0.29
Czech Republic	0.29
South Korea	0.28
Bolivia	0.27
Tunisia	0.27
India	0.27
Saint Lucia	0.27
Qatar	0.27
Macedonia	0.26
Poland	0.26
United States	0.26
Mozambique	0.25
Benin	0.25
Estonia	0.26
Mexico	0.25
Equatorial Guinea	0.25
Cuba	0.25
Comoros	0.25
Thailand	0.24
Ecuador	0.24
Vanuatu	0.24
Jordan	0.23
Mali	0.23
Afghanistan	0.23
Moldova	0.23
Slovakia	0.23
Dominica	0.23
Greece	0.23
Argentina	0.23
Senegal	0.22
Honduras	0.22
Taiwan	0.22
Iceland	0.22
Japan	0.22
Morocco	0.22
Azerbaijan	0.22
Seychelles	0.22
Guinea	0.21
Luxembourg	0.21
Indonesia	0.21
Liberia	0.21
Cyprus	0.21
Tajikistan	0.20
Botswana	0.19
Chile	0.19
Yemen	0.19
Slovenia	0.18
Belgium	0.18
Turkey	0.18
Namibia	0.18
Togo	0.18
Montenegro	0.18
Peru	0.18
Egypt	0.18
Croatia	0.17
Germany	0.17
Nicaragua	0.17
Israel	0.17
Gambia	0.17
Nepal	0.16
Armenia	0.16
New Zealand	0.16
Sao Tome and Principe	0.16
Finland	0.16
Burkina Faso	0.16
Gabon	0.16
Italy	0.16
Mauritius	0.16
Georgia	0.16
Hungary	0.16
Austria	0.15
Pakistan	0.15
Brazil	0.15
Spain	0.15
Lithuania	0.15
Philippines	0.15
Romania	0.15
Palestine	0.15
Ghana	0.14
Netherlands	0.14
Portugal	0.14
Haiti	0.14
Paraguay	0.14
Albania	0.14
Colombia	0.13
Cape Verde	0.13
Djibouti	0.13
Swaziland	0.13
Guatemala	0.13
Kenya	0.13
Zambia	0.13
El Salvador	0.13
Latvia	0.13
Ireland	0.13
Panama	0.13
Dominican Republic	0.12
Niger	0.12
United Kingdom	0.12
Myanmar	0.12
Bangladesh	0.12
Cameroon	0.12
Singapore	0.12
Uruguay	0.11
Madagascar	0.11
Nigeria	0.11
France	0.11
Angola	0.10
Guinea-Bissau	0.10
Chad	0.10
Costa Rica	0.10
Denmark	0.10
Sierra Leone	0.10
Côte d'Ivoire	0.10
Malta	0.09
Burundi	0.09
Hong Kong	0.09
Norway	0.08
Malawi	0.08
Tanzania	0.08
Sweden	0.08
Ethiopia	0.07
Sri Lanka	0.07
Switzerland	0.06
Central African Republic	0.06
Uganda	0.06
Rwanda	0.05
DR Congo	0.04

=== World regions and income groups ===
Region / income group	CO_{2} kg/$
Upper-middle-income countries	0.35
Asia	0.33
Oceania	0.29
World	0.29
North America	0.26
Lower-middle-income countries	0.25
Africa	0.22
High income countries	0.22
Europe	0.20
Low-income countries	0.20
South America	0.18

== Historical development ==
Development of CO_{2} emissions in kilograms per international dollar of economic output in major countries over time.

Country	2022	2010	2000	1990	1980	1970	1950	1900	1850	1820	1950–2018 (change)
Argentina	0.23	0.24	0.27	0.33	0.29	0.30	0.22	0.10			+5%
Australia	0.29	0.41	0.51	0.60	0.66	0.61	0.57	0.42			−49%
Bangladesh	0.12	0.13	0.13	0.13	0.10	0.06	0.03				+300%
Belgium	0.18	0.28	0.37	0.44	0.59	0.77	1.01	1.24	0.71		−82%
Brazil	0.15	0.16	0.20	0.18	0.18	0.21	0.16	0.12			−6%
Canada	0.31	0.40	0.50	0.55	0.70	0.82	0.95	0.81			−67%
China	0.42	0.67	0.61	0.73	0.79	0.71	0.18				+133%
France	0.11	0.16	0.20	0.24	0.39	0.49	0.58	0.69	0.21	0.05	−81%
Germany	0.17	0.25	0.33	0.52	0.62	0.76	1.21	1.26	0.20	0.09	−86%
India	0.27	0.32	0.35	0.33	0.29	0.24	0.17	0.04			+59%
Indonesia	0.21	0.22	0.24	0.20	0.22	0.16	0.09	0.02			+133%
Italy	0.16	0.21	0.25	0.30	0.33	0.36	0.16	0.13			+0%
Japan	0.22	0.27	0.30	0.31	0.38	0.48	0.40	0.21			−45%
Mexico	0.25	0.28	0.32	0.38	0.39	0.31	0.31	0.04			−19%
Netherlands	0.14	0.25	0.28	0.39	0.53	0.57	0.53	0.54			−74%
Nigeria	0.11	0.14	0.29	0.23	0.44	0.22	0.06				+83%
Pakistan	0.15	0.19	0.23	0.23	0.20	0.21	0.13				+15%
Philippines	0.15	0.15	0.22	0.18	0.19	0.23	0.10				+50%
Poland	0.26	0.42	0.65	1.21	1.42	1.32	1.16				−80%
Russia	0.44	0.52	0.96	1.38	1.25	1.20					−64%
Saudi Arabia	0.36	0.45	0.61	0.91	0.80	0.61	0.37				−3%
South Africa	0.56	0.80	1.11	1.33	1.11	1.02	1.11				−50%
South Korea	0.34	0.38	0.41	0.42	0.58	0.56	0.10				+240%
Spain	0.15	0.19	0.28	0.31	0.41	0.36	0.34	0.23			−56%
Sweden	0.08	0.13	0.18	0.24	0.36	0.57	0.38	0.54			−79%
Switzerland	0.06	0.10	0.14	0.19	0.23	0.27	0.19	0.26			−58%
United Kingdom	0.12	0.23	0.30	0.40	0.50	0.68	0.90	1.34	1.04	0.61	−87%
United States	0.26	0.37	0.46	0.55	0.71	0.88	1.10	1.08	0.23	0.03	−76%
Vietnam	0.41	0.34	0.24	0.19	0.26	0.56	0.06				+583%
