= List of countries by renewable electricity production =

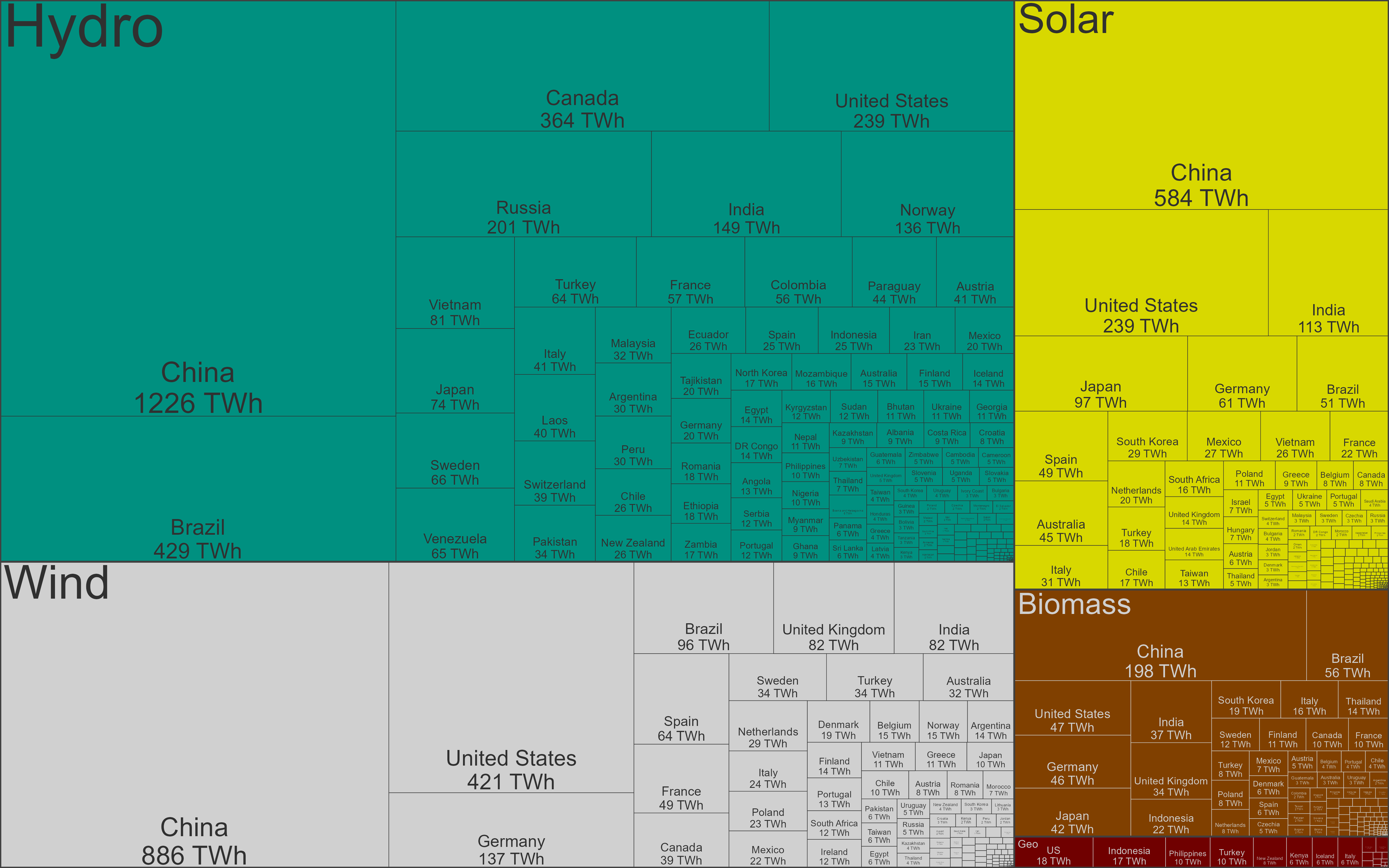
Renewable electricity generation by source and country in 2023

This is a list of countries and dependencies by electricity generation from renewable sources.

Renewables accounted for 32% of electric generation in 2024. Renewables consist of hydro (44%), wind (25%), solar (22%), biomass (6%) and other renewables (1%). In 2025 China produced 32% of global renewable electricity, followed by the United States (11%), Brazil (7.0%), Canada (4.7%) and India (4.3%).

Share of primary energy consumption from renewable sources by country

Share of primary energy consumption from renewable sources by world region over time

Renewable investment reached almost $500 billion globally in 2022, amounting to 83% of new electric capacity that year. The renewable energy industry employs almost 14 million people.

== Renewable production (TWh) ==
Data in this table are from Ember. It includes some dependent territories. All figures are in terawatt-hours. The 'Renewables' column indicates the amount of that country's overall electric generation that was renewable.

Links for each location go to the relevant renewable energy page, when available.

Location	Renew.	Hydro	Wind	Solar	Bio.	Other	Year
World	10,714.80	4,433.08	2,711.33	2,778.23	702.83	89.33	2025
China	3,912.68	1,395.70	1,135.44	1,174.92	206.62		2025
United States	1,158.80	241.70	464.39	388.82	46.19	17.70	2025
Brazil	649.97	388.63	117.58	88.64	55.12		2025
India	500.98	177.97	103.98	195.99	23.04		2025
Canada	416.84	344.74	51.48	10.17	10.45		2025
Germany	295.74	19.56	136.03	89.62	50.53		2025
Japan	242.73	73.90	12.85	101.06	54.92		2025
Russia	206.98	199.73	3.64	2.84	0.77		2025
Spain	160.81	32.74	58.76	62.90	6.41		2025
Norway	159.20	144.77	13.56	0.53	0.24	0.10	2025
Turkey	153.07	57.27	39.42	37.25	8.48	10.65	2025
United Kingdom	151.92	5.55	85.84	19.32	41.21		2025
France	148.75	59.41	46.49	32.01	10.27	0.57	2025
Vietnam	140.79	102.35	14.37	23.04	1.03		2025
Italy	129.11	41.70	21.48	44.63	15.61	5.69	2025
Sweden	121.53	68.24	38.90	4.43	9.96		2025
Australia	110.58	12.22	39.23	56.09	3.04		2025
Pakistan	82.88	41.24	4.46	36.63	0.55		2025
Mexico	82.43	28.75	21.38	26.34	5.96		2025
Venezuela	73.03	73.00	0.02	0.01			2024
Colombia	69.60	62.50	0.15	4.60	2.35		2025
Netherlands	69.10	0.05	33.70	28.50	6.85		2025
Indonesia	67.21	27.29	0.47	1.35	21.33	16.77	2024
South Korea	64.93	3.80	3.64	37.80	19.69		2025
Austria	61.21	37.93	8.31	10.31	4.66		2025
Chile	58.74	19.68	11.58	22.18	5.03	0.27	2025
Poland	54.59	1.70	24.62	19.55	8.48	0.24	2025
Argentina	52.96	26.25	18.62	5.14	2.95		2025
Finland	46.47	12.44	22.58	0.98	10.34	0.13	2025
Paraguay	45.35	45.11			0.24		2025
Switzerland	44.10	33.99	0.14	7.89	1.04	1.04	2025
Malaysia	41.53	35.24		4.51	1.78		2025
Portugal	41.39	15.18	13.67	8.86	3.48	0.20	2025
Laos	40.13	40.00		0.09	0.04		2024
Peru	38.47	33.88	2.11	1.83	0.65		2025
New Zealand	38.37	23.77	4.22	0.37	0.57	9.44	2025
Taiwan	35.30	5.51	12.01	15.68	2.10		2025
Ethiopia	33.37	32.19	1.10	0.04	0.01	0.03	2025
South Africa	33.10	1.83	11.32	19.48	0.47		2025
Egypt	31.98	15.07	9.30	7.61			2025
Thailand	31.20	7.62	3.41	9.98	10.19		2025
Denmark	30.36	0.02	19.21	4.45	6.68		2025
Ecuador	29.06	28.51	0.19	0.04	0.32		2025
Greece	28.96	3.42	11.91	12.92	0.71		2025
Philippines	28.70	12.70	1.46	3.00	1.45	10.09	2025
Belgium	28.38	0.44	13.72	10.45	3.77		2025
Romania	23.43	12.09	5.97	4.88	0.49		2025
Tajikistan	22.60	22.60					2025
Iceland	19.05	13.46	0.01	0.01		5.57	2024
Kazakhstan	18.38	10.51	5.83	2.04			2025
Ukraine	18.30	11.02	1.42	5.08	0.78		2022
Zambia	17.25	17.00		0.17	0.08		2024
North Korea	17.17	17.00		0.17			2024
Uzbekistan	16.80	6.30	4.00	6.50			2025
Mozambique	16.51	16.30		0.08	0.13		2024
DR Congo	15.92	13.40		2.51	0.01		2024
United Arab Emirates	15.62		0.20	15.21	0.21		2024
Iran	15.21	13.03	1.25	0.90	0.03		2025
Ireland	14.92	0.65	11.76	1.49	1.02		2025
Hungary	14.21	0.23	0.60	10.98	2.39	0.01	2025
Israel	13.90		0.46	13.28	0.16		2025
Kyrgyzstan	13.37	13.37					2025
Nigeria	13.01	12.82		0.13	0.06		2025
Costa Rica	12.81	9.58	1.55	0.09	0.06	1.53	2025
Czech Republic	12.72	1.71	0.57	4.39	6.05		2025
Kenya	12.64	2.94	2.30	0.65	0.30	6.45	2025
Bulgaria	12.45	2.53	1.32	6.89	1.71		2025
Sudan	11.77	11.50		0.16	0.11		2024
Uruguay	11.68	3.25	4.85	0.61	2.97		2025
Angola	11.49	11.00		0.44	0.05		2024
Croatia	11.21	5.77	3.15	1.29	1.00		2025
Nepal	11.13	11.00	0.01	0.12			2024
Bhutan	11.00	11.00					2024
Guatemala	10.79	6.30	0.37	0.28	3.50	0.34	2024
Georgia	10.75	10.64	0.08	0.03			2025
Sri Lanka	10.63	6.59	0.93	2.84	0.23	0.04	2025
Myanmar	10.39	10.00		0.12	0.27		2024
Morocco	10.28	0.92	6.74	2.58	0.04		2025
Serbia	10.18	8.14	1.47	0.16	0.41		2025
Saudi Arabia	9.82		1.59	8.23			2024
Panama	9.13	7.13	0.96	0.99	0.05		2024
Ghana	8.79	8.60		0.17	0.02		2024
Albania	8.34	8.00		0.34			2024
Cambodia	7.26	5.31		1.89	0.06		2025
Honduras	6.92	3.80	0.75	1.18	0.84	0.35	2024
Lithuania	6.90	0.35	3.99	1.67	0.89		2025
Bosnia and Herzegovina	6.29	5.29	0.37	0.59	0.04		2025
Slovenia	5.88	4.04	0.01	1.54	0.29		2025
Zimbabwe	5.86	5.70		0.04	0.12		2024
Jordan	5.70	0.02	1.75	3.93			2024
Uganda	5.64	5.00		0.17	0.47		2024
El Salvador	5.59	1.96	0.20	1.31	0.78	1.34	2025
Slovakia	5.45	3.16		0.70	1.58	0.01	2025
Dominican Republic	5.40	1.53	1.42	2.25	0.20		2025
Cameroon	5.31	5.23		0.04	0.04		2024
Bolivia	4.92	3.80	0.28	0.40	0.44		2025
Latvia	4.58	2.93	0.22	0.82	0.61		2025
Estonia	3.64	0.03	1.15	1.13	1.33		2025
Singapore	3.30			1.64	1.66		2025
North Macedonia	3.22	1.36	0.20	1.62	0.04		2025
Ivory Coast	3.12	3.00		0.02	0.10		2024
Guinea	3.03	3.00		0.03			2024
Tanzania	2.91	2.80		0.04	0.07		2024
Nicaragua	2.82	0.65	0.56	0.03	0.89	0.69	2024
Azerbaijan	2.73	2.54	0.09		0.10		2025
Armenia	2.68	1.93		0.75			2025
Iraq	2.43	2.00		0.43			2024
Oman	2.40		0.10	2.30			2025
Lebanon	2.34	0.70	0.01	1.60	0.03		2024
Qatar	2.28			2.15	0.13		2025
Bangladesh	2.21	0.65		1.56			2025
Kuwait	2.07		1.86	0.21			2025
Montenegro	1.86	1.44	0.28	0.14			2025
Malawi	1.75	1.69		0.01	0.05		2024
Réunion	1.74	0.39	0.02	0.29	1.04		2023
Cyprus	1.64		0.21	1.37	0.06		2025
Belarus	1.63	0.69	0.35	0.13	0.46		2025
Namibia	1.60	1.00	0.02	0.58			2024
Senegal	1.51	0.31	0.41	0.68	0.11		2024
Luxembourg	1.41	0.05	0.47	0.47	0.42		2025
Puerto Rico	1.20	0.01	0.23	0.95	0.01		2025
Mali	1.16	0.92		0.17	0.07		2024
Congo	1.14	1.10		0.01	0.03		2024
Papua New Guinea	1.12	1.00		0.01	0.01	0.10	2024
Algeria	1.03	0.02	0.02	0.99			2024
Madagascar	1.03	0.90		0.10	0.03		2024
Gabon	0.92	0.91			0.01		2024
Suriname	0.92	0.90		0.01	0.01		2024
Tunisia	0.90	0.01	0.33	0.56			2025
Syria	0.88	0.75		0.10	0.03		2024
Afghanistan	0.86	0.75		0.11			2024
New Caledonia	0.84	0.54	0.04	0.26			2024
Mongolia	0.81	0.06	0.54	0.21			2025
Cuba	0.78	0.12	0.07	0.24	0.35		2024
Fiji	0.73	0.60		0.01	0.12		2024
Moldova	0.69	0.35	0.16	0.16	0.02		2025
French Guiana	0.64	0.52		0.06	0.06		2023
Jamaica	0.62	0.12	0.29	0.15	0.06		2024
Mauritius	0.61	0.11	0.01	0.17	0.32		2024
Kosovo	0.59	0.23	0.35	0.01			2025
Yemen	0.59			0.59			2024
Guadeloupe	0.59	0.01	0.10	0.11	0.26	0.11	2023
Eswatini	0.59	0.35		0.03	0.21		2024
Rwanda	0.56	0.52		0.04			2024
Greenland	0.50	0.47			0.03		2024
Mauritania	0.47	0.21	0.10	0.16			2024
Belize	0.41	0.24		0.01	0.16		2024
Equatorial Guinea	0.40	0.40					2024
Hong Kong	0.39			0.23	0.16		2024
Martinique	0.39		0.03	0.11	0.24	0.01	2023
Palestine	0.39			0.39			2024
Burundi	0.37	0.36			0.01		2024
Malta	0.35			0.34	0.01		2025
Liberia	0.31	0.30		0.01			2024
Burkina Faso	0.29	0.09		0.11	0.09		2024
French Polynesia	0.25	0.19		0.06			2024
Macau	0.24				0.24		2024
Faroe Islands	0.23	0.13	0.09		0.01		2023
Togo	0.21	0.08		0.13			2024
Sierra Leone	0.20	0.18		0.02			2024
Aruba	0.17		0.14	0.03			2024
Guam	0.16			0.16			2024
Haiti	0.16	0.16					2024
Cape Verde	0.16		0.08	0.08			2024
Central African Republic	0.14	0.14					2023
Bahrain	0.10			0.10			2024
Barbados	0.10			0.10			2024
Seychelles	0.10		0.01	0.09			2024
Somalia	0.09		0.01	0.08			2024
Djibouti	0.07		0.07				2024
Samoa	0.07	0.03		0.03	0.01		2024
Maldives	0.06			0.06			2024
Eritrea	0.05			0.05			2024
Guyana	0.04			0.02	0.02		2024
Benin	0.04			0.04			2024
Niger	0.03			0.03			2024
Cayman Islands	0.03			0.03			2024
Antigua and Barbuda	0.03			0.03			2024
Bahamas	0.02			0.02			2024
U.S. Virgin Islands	0.02			0.02			2023
Chad	0.02		0.01		0.01		2024
Saint Kitts and Nevis	0.02		0.01	0.01			2024
Dominica	0.02	0.02					2023
Saint Vincent and the Grenadines	0.02	0.02					2024
Vanuatu	0.02	0.01		0.01			2023
Cook Islands	0.02			0.02			2024
Libya	0.01			0.01			2024
Turkmenistan	0.01	0.01					2024
Trinidad and Tobago	0.01			0.01			2024
Brunei	0.01			0.01			2024
Botswana	0.01			0.01			2024
Bermuda	0.01				0.01		2024
South Sudan	0.01			0.01			2024
Saint Lucia	0.01			0.01			2024
Turks and Caicos Islands	0.01			0.01			2024
American Samoa	0.01			0.01			2024
Solomon Islands	0.01			0.01			2024
São Tomé and Príncipe	0.01	0.01					2023
Tonga	0.01			0.01			2024
Nauru	0.01			0.01			2024
Kiribati	0.01			0.01			2024
Gambia							2024
Timor-Leste							2024
Grenada							2024
Gibraltar							2024
British Virgin Islands							2023
Comoros							2023
Western Sahara							2009
Guinea-Bissau							2024
Saint Pierre and Miquelon							2023
Falkland Islands							2023
Montserrat							2024
Saint Helena, Ascension and Tristan da Cunha							2023
Lesotho							2024
Niue							2023

== Renewable production (percent) ==
Data in this table are from Ember. It includes some dependent territories. The 'Renewables' column indicates the percent of that country's overall electric generation that was renewable.

Links for each location go to the relevant renewable energy page, when available.

Location	Renew.	Hydro	Wind	Solar	Bio.	Other	Year
World	33.8	14.0	8.5	8.8	2.2	0.3	2025
Iceland	100.0	70.7	0.1	0.1		29.2	2024
DR Congo	100.0	84.2		15.8	0.1		2024
Paraguay	100.0	99.5			0.5		2025
Costa Rica	100.0	74.8	12.1	0.7	0.5	11.9	2025
Bhutan	100.0	100.0					2024
Albania	100.0	95.9		4.1			2024
Central African Republic	100.0	100.0					2023
Lesotho	100.0	100.0					2022
Ethiopia	100.0	96.5	3.3	0.1		0.1	2025
Nepal	100.0	98.8	0.1	1.1			2024
Norway	98.9	90.0	8.4	0.3	0.1	0.1	2025
Uruguay	97.8	27.2	40.6	5.1	24.9		2025
Namibia	97.6	61.0	1.2	35.4			2024
Uganda	97.1	86.1		2.9	8.1		2024
Eswatini	96.7	57.4		4.9	34.4		2024
Malawi	95.5	92.3		0.5	2.7		2024
Sierra Leone	95.2	85.7		9.5			2024
Tajikistan	94.1	94.1					2025
Luxembourg	91.5	3.2	30.5	30.5	27.3		2025
Denmark	91.3	0.1	57.7	13.4	20.1		2025
Venezuela	91.1	91.1					2024
Kenya	89.9	20.9	16.4	4.6	2.1	45.9	2025
New Zealand	88.5	54.8	9.7	0.9	1.3	21.8	2025
Zambia	87.5	86.2		0.9	0.4		2024
Belize	87.2	51.1		2.1	34.0		2024
Afghanistan	86.9	75.8		11.1			2024
Brazil	86.6	51.8	15.7	11.8	7.3		2025
El Salvador	86.5	30.3	3.1	20.3	12.1	20.7	2025
Kyrgyzstan	85.2	85.2					2025
Austria	83.6	51.8	11.3	14.1	6.4		2025
Mozambique	83.5	82.4		0.4	0.7		2024
Greenland	83.3	78.3			5.0		2024
Portugal	80.9	29.7	26.7	17.3	6.8	0.4	2025
Sudan	79.7	77.9		1.1	0.7		2024
Georgia	79.6	78.8	0.6	0.2			2025
Ecuador	79.4	77.9	0.5	0.1	0.9		2025
Lithuania	77.6	3.9	44.9	18.8	10.0		2025
Colombia	77.1	69.2	0.2	5.1	2.6		2025
Laos	76.8	76.5		0.2	0.1		2024
Croatia	76.3	39.3	21.4	8.8	6.8		2025
Montenegro	75.6	58.5	11.4	5.7			2025
Burundi	75.5	73.5			2.0		2024
Guinea	75.1	74.4		0.7			2024
Angola	73.7	70.6		2.8	0.3		2024
Cameroon	73.2	72.0		0.6	0.6		2024
Latvia	73.0	46.7	3.5	13.1	9.7		2025
Sweden	71.2	40.0	22.8	2.6	5.8		2025
Guatemala	68.4	39.9	2.3	1.8	22.2	2.2	2024
Panama	68.0	53.1	7.1	7.4	0.4		2024
Switzerland	67.8	52.3	0.2	12.1	1.6	1.6	2025
Chile	66.4	22.2	13.1	25.1	5.7	0.3	2025
French Guiana	65.3	53.1		6.1	6.1		2023
Canada	63.9	52.8	7.9	1.6	1.6		2025
Peru	63.7	56.1	3.5	3.0	1.1		2025
Fiji	63.5	52.2		0.9	10.4		2024
North Korea	63.3	62.7		0.6			2024
Nicaragua	62.5	14.4	12.4	0.7	19.7	15.3	2024
Sri Lanka	61.6	38.2	5.4	16.5	1.3	0.2	2025
Estonia	59.6	0.5	18.8	18.5	21.8		2025
Germany	59.1	3.9	27.2	17.9	10.1		2025
Zimbabwe	57.2	55.6		0.4	1.2		2024
Réunion	56.7	12.7	0.7	9.4	33.9		2023
Finland	56.5	15.1	27.4	1.2	12.6	0.2	2025
Spain	55.8	11.4	20.4	21.8	2.2		2025
Honduras	55.4	30.4	6.0	9.5	6.7	2.8	2024
Liberia	54.4	52.6		1.8			2024
Suriname	52.9	51.7		0.6	0.6		2024
United Kingdom	52.0	1.9	29.4	6.6	14.1		2025
Netherlands	51.2		25.0	21.1	5.1		2025
Cook Islands	50.0			50.0			2024
Greece	49.7	5.9	20.4	22.2	1.2		2025
Rwanda	49.5	46.0		3.5			2024
Italy	48.8	15.8	8.1	16.9	5.9	2.1	2025
Ireland	48.2	2.1	38.0	4.8	3.3		2025
Myanmar	47.9	46.1		0.6	1.2		2024
North Macedonia	47.2	19.9	2.9	23.8	0.6		2025
Romania	47.1	24.3	12.0	9.8	1.0		2025
Faroe Islands	46.9	26.5	18.4		2.0		2023
Pakistan	46.8	23.3	2.5	20.7	0.3		2025
Vietnam	45.3	33.0	4.6	7.4	0.3		2025
Lebanon	43.9	13.1	0.2	30.0	0.6		2024
Samoa	43.9	18.8		18.8	6.3		2024
Bosnia and Herzegovina	43.6	36.6	2.6	4.1	0.3		2025
Turkey	43.2	16.2	11.1	10.5	2.4	3.0	2025
Madagascar	42.3	37.0		4.1	1.2		2024
Cambodia	40.8	29.9		10.6	0.3		2025
Slovenia	39.7	27.2	0.1	10.4	2.0		2025
Palestine	39.4			39.4			2024
Belgium	38.9	0.6	18.8	14.3	5.2		2025
Australia	38.7	4.3	13.7	19.6	1.1		2025
China	37.0	13.2	10.7	11.1	2.0		2025
Ghana	36.2	35.4		0.7	0.1		2024
Bolivia	36.1	27.9	2.1	2.9	3.2		2025
Gabon	35.4	35.0			0.4		2024
Guadeloupe	35.4	0.6	6.0	6.6	15.6	6.6	2023
Hungary	35.3	0.6	1.5	27.3	5.9		2025
Djibouti	35.0		35.0				2024
French Polynesia	34.7	26.4		8.3			2024
Argentina	34.6	17.1	12.2	3.4	1.9		2025
Tanzania	33.0	31.7		0.5	0.8		2024
Bulgaria	32.9	6.7	3.5	18.2	4.5		2025
Poland	31.5	1.0	14.2	11.3	4.9	0.1	2025
Nigeria	31.3	30.9		0.3	0.1		2025
Armenia	31.0	22.3		8.7			2025
Macau	30.8				30.8		2024
Cape Verde	30.8		15.4	15.4			2024
Togo	29.6	11.3		18.3			2024
Ivory Coast	28.9	27.8		0.2	0.9		2024
Cyprus	27.8		3.6	23.2	1.0		2025
Serbia	27.7	22.2	4.0	0.4	1.1		2025
New Caledonia	26.9	17.3	1.3	8.3			2024
Equatorial Guinea	26.8	26.8					2024
France	26.1	10.4	8.2	5.6	1.8	0.1	2025
Martinique	25.9		2.0	7.3	15.9	0.7	2023
United States	25.6	5.3	10.3	8.6	1.0	0.4	2025
Vanuatu	25.0	12.5		12.5			2023
Kiribati	25.0			25.0			2024
Jordan	24.1	0.1	7.4	16.6			2024
India	24.0	8.5	5.0	9.4	1.1		2025
Dominican Republic	23.8	6.7	6.3	9.9	0.9		2025
Papua New Guinea	23.6	21.1		0.2	0.2	2.1	2024
Japan	23.5	7.2	1.2	9.8	5.3		2025
Morocco	23.3	2.1	15.3	5.8	0.1		2025
Philippines	23.3	10.3	1.2	2.4	1.2	8.2	2025
Mexico	23.2	8.1	6.0	7.4	1.7		2025
Mauritania	22.6	10.1	4.8	7.7			2024
Somalia	20.9		2.3	18.6			2024
Congo	20.8	20.1		0.2	0.5		2024
Malaysia	20.6	17.5		2.2	0.9		2025
Nauru	20.0			20.0			2024
Senegal	19.8	4.1	5.4	8.9	1.4		2024
Mali	19.5	15.4		2.9	1.2		2024
Uzbekistan	19.4	7.3	4.6	7.5			2025
Slovakia	18.7	10.9		2.4	5.4		2025
Haiti	18.6	18.6					2024
Indonesia	18.0	7.3	0.1	0.4	5.7	4.5	2024
Mauritius	17.9	3.2	0.3	5.0	9.4		2024
Russia	17.3	16.7	0.3	0.2	0.1		2025
Burkina Faso	17.1	5.3		6.5	5.3		2024
Israel	17.0		0.6	16.2	0.2		2025
Aruba	17.0		14.0	3.0			2024
Czech Republic	16.9	2.3	0.8	5.8	8.0		2025
Thailand	16.5	4.0	1.8	5.3	5.4		2025
Ukraine	16.5	9.9	1.3	4.6	0.7		2022
Malta	16.0			15.5	0.5		2025
Seychelles	15.9		1.6	14.3			2024
Kazakhstan	14.8	8.5	4.7	1.6			2025
Tonga	14.3			14.3			2024
South Africa	13.7	0.8	4.7	8.0	0.2		2025
Dominica	13.3	13.3					2023
Saint Vincent and the Grenadines	13.3	13.3					2024
Egypt	13.0	6.1	3.8	3.1			2025
Jamaica	12.5	2.4	5.9	3.0	1.2		2024
Taiwan	12.2	1.9	4.2	5.4	0.7		2025
Moldova	11.2	5.7	2.6	2.6	0.3		2025
Yemen	11.2			11.2			2024
Eritrea	11.1			11.1			2024
São Tomé and Príncipe	11.1	11.1					2023
Kosovo	11.1	4.3	6.6	0.2			2025
South Korea	10.5	0.6	0.6	6.1	3.2		2025
Azerbaijan	9.9	9.2	0.3		0.4		2025
Solomon Islands	9.1			9.1			2024
Barbados	9.0			9.0			2024
United Arab Emirates	8.8		0.1	8.6	0.1		2024
Guam	8.6			8.6			2024
Saint Kitts and Nevis	8.6		4.3	4.3			2024
Mongolia	8.4	0.6	5.6	2.2			2025
Antigua and Barbuda	8.1			8.1			2024
Maldives	7.1			7.1			2024
Puerto Rico	6.3	0.1	1.2	4.9	0.1		2025
American Samoa	5.6			5.6			2024
Singapore	5.5			2.7	2.8		2025
Chad	5.4		2.7		2.7		2024
Oman	4.6		0.2	4.4			2025
Cayman Islands	4.2			4.2			2024
Qatar	4.0			3.8	0.2		2025
Tunisia	4.0		1.5	2.5			2025
Cuba	4.0	0.6	0.4	1.2	1.8		2024
Benin	4.0			4.0			2024
Iran	3.8	3.3	0.3	0.2			2025
Turks and Caicos Islands	3.7			3.7			2024
Belarus	3.6	1.5	0.8	0.3	1.0		2025
Syria	3.5	3.0		0.4	0.1		2024
Niger	3.2			3.2			2024
U.S. Virgin Islands	2.9			2.9			2023
Guyana	2.8			1.4	1.4		2024
Saint Lucia	2.5			2.5			2024
Kuwait	2.2		2.0	0.2			2025
Saudi Arabia	2.1		0.3	1.8			2024
Bangladesh	2.1	0.6		1.5			2025
South Sudan	1.8			1.8			2024
Iraq	1.6	1.3		0.3			2024
Bermuda	1.6				1.6		2024
Algeria	1.0			1.0			2024
Hong Kong	1.0			0.6	0.4		2024
Bahamas	0.9			0.9			2024
Bahrain	0.3			0.3			2024
Botswana	0.3			0.3			2024
Brunei	0.2			0.2			2024
Trinidad and Tobago	0.1			0.1			2024
Libya							2024
Turkmenistan							2024
Gambia							2024
Timor-Leste							2024
Grenada							2024
Gibraltar							2024
British Virgin Islands							2023
Comoros							2023
Western Sahara							2009
Guinea-Bissau							2024
Saint Pierre and Miquelon							2023
Falkland Islands							2023
Montserrat							2024
Saint Helena, Ascension and Tristan da Cunha							2023
Niue							2023

== See also ==
- List of countries by carbon dioxide emissions
- List of countries by carbon dioxide emissions per capita
- List of countries by electricity consumption
- List of countries by electricity production
- List of countries by energy intensity
- List of countries by greenhouse gas emissions
- List of countries by greenhouse gas emissions per capita
- List of countries by energy consumption and production
- List of locations and entities by greenhouse gas emissions
