= List of countries by energy intensity =

The following are lists of countries by energy intensity, or total energy consumption per unit GDP.

== Our World in Data (2021/22) ==
The following is a list of countries by energy intensity as published by the World Resources Institute for the year 2022. It is given in units of kilowatt-hours per constant year 2011 international dollar of GDP.

Energy intensity (kilowatt-hours of energy consumption per USD)
Country	Energy intensity	Year
Turkmenistan	4.64	2022
Trinidad and Tobago	4.61	2022
Venezuela	4.34	2022
Bahrain	4.18	2021
Iceland	3.98	2022
Laos	2.66	2021
North Korea	2.46	2021
Mozambique	2.38	2021
Oman	2.35	2022
Russia	2.31	2022
Malta	2.29	2021
Canada	2.26	2022
Iran	2.21	2022
Syria	2.16	2021
Barbados	2.12	2021
Ukraine	2.09	2022
Lebanon	2.07	2021
Kyrgyzstan	2.04	2021
Kuwait	1.97	2022
Moldova	1.94	2021
Singapore	1.91	2022
South Africa	1.87	2022
Libya	1.82	2021
Jamaica	1.80	2022
Serbia	1.77	2021
Mongolia	1.76	2021
United Arab Emirates	1.74	2022
Saudi Arabia	1.73	2022
Zimbabwe	1.68	2021
Belarus	1.67	2022
Bulgaria	1.66	2022
South Korea	1.66	2022
Seychelles	1.66	2021
Bosnia and Herzegovina	1.66	2021
China	1.65	2022
Kazakhstan	1.63	2022
Paraguay	1.63	2021
Saint Lucia	1.61	2021
Tajikistan	1.60	2021
Estonia	1.58	2022
Malaysia	1.52	2022
Uzbekistan	1.50	2022
Vietnam	1.49	2022
Qatar	1.48	2022
Belgium	1.42	2022
Finland	1.42	2022
Armenia	1.40	2021
Panama	1.38	2021
Liberia	1.37	2021
United States	1.36	2022
Czech Republic	1.33	2022
World	1.30	2022
Ecuador	1.27	2022
Sweden	1.26	2022
Iraq	1.26	2022
Cuba	1.26	2022
Mauritania	1.26	2021
Australia	1.24	2022
Thailand	1.23	2022
Algeria	1.23	2022
Georgia	1.22	2021
Dominica	1.20	2021
Argentina	1.20	2022
Azerbaijan	1.20	2022
Slovakia	1.20	2022
Greece	1.19	2022
Cape Verde	1.18	2021
Brazil	1.17	2022
New Zealand	1.16	2022
Albania	1.15	2021
Bolivia	1.13	2021
Chile	1.12	2022
Mexico	1.12	2022
Norway	1.10	2022
Netherlands	1.09	2022
Honduras	1.09	2022
Cambodia	1.08	2021
Luxembourg	1.07	2022
North Macedonia	1.06	2022
Taiwan	1.06	2022
Jordan	1.06	2022
Namibia	1.05	2021
Japan	1.05	2022
Equatorial Guinea	1.04	2021
Benin	1.03	2021
Mauritius	1.03	2021
Lesotho	1.03	2021
Slovenia	1.02	2022
Zambia	1.01	2021
Peru	0.99	2022
Montenegro	0.99	2021
Spain	0.98	2022
India	0.96	2022
Poland	0.96	2022
Austria	0.95	2022
Uruguay	0.95	2021
Hungary	0.94	2022
Djibouti	0.94	2021
Nicaragua	0.93	2021
Cyprus	0.92	2022
Israel	0.92	2022
Tunisia	0.92	2021
Croatia	0.91	2022
São Tomé and Príncipe	0.90	2021
Portugal	0.89	2022
Palestine	0.89	2021
Germany	0.87	2022
Mali	0.87	2021
France	0.86	2022
Morocco	0.86	2022
Senegal	0.85	2021
Turkey	0.83	2022
Colombia	0.82	2022
Comoros	0.82	2021
Ghana	0.81	2022
Italy	0.80	2022
Indonesia	0.80	2022
Costa Rica	0.80	2021
United Kingdom	0.77	2022
Lithuania	0.77	2022
El Salvador	0.77	2021
Guinea	0.77	2022
Egypt	0.76	2022
Pakistan	0.76	2022
Latvia	0.75	2022
Eswatini	0.73	2021
Guatemala	0.72	2022
Togo	0.72	2021
Romania	0.71	2022
Puerto Rico	0.71	2021
Denmark	0.66	2022
Botswana	0.66	2021
Haiti	0.66	2022
Angola	0.63	2021
Hong Kong	0.61	2022
Dominican Republic	0.61	2021
Bangladesh	0.60	2022
Ireland	0.60	2022
Republic of the Congo	0.59	2021
Yemen	0.59	2021
Myanmar	0.58	2021
Ivory Coast	0.57	2021
Kenya	0.57	2022
Philippines	0.56	2022
Burkina Faso	0.55	2021
Gambia	0.55	2022
Gabon	0.54	2021
Cameroon	0.54	2021
Nepal	0.53	2021
Switzerland	0.52	2022
Nigeria	0.49	2021
Afghanistan	0.48	2021
Democratic Republic of the Congo	0.46	2021
Niger	0.46	2021
Guinea-Bissau	0.45	2022
Central African Republic	0.42	2021
Ethiopia	0.42	2021
Burundi	0.41	2021
Madagascar	0.40	2021
Sri Lanka	0.38	2021
Sierra Leone	0.37	2021
Uganda	0.36	2021
Malawi	0.35	2021
Tanzania	0.30	2021
Chad	0.26	2021
Rwanda	0.24	2021

== World Resources Institute (2003) ==
The following is a list of countries by energy intensity as published by the World Resources Institute for the year 2003. It is given in units of tonnes of oil equivalent per million constant year 2000 international dollars.

* indicates "Energy consumption in COUNTRY or TERRITORY" or "Energy in COUNTRY or TERRITORY" links.

Energy intensity (tonnes of oil per million USD)
Country	Energy intensity
World	212.9
Albania *	158.2
Algeria *	176.8
Angola *	322.6
Argentina *	138.6
Armenia *	191.1
Australia *	208.3
Austria *	139.1
Azerbaijan *	437.2
Bahrain *	559.4
Bangladesh *	97.9
Belarus *	458.9
Belgium *	205.5
Benin *	301.3
Bolivia *	205.8
Bosnia and Herzegovina *	189.0
Botswana *	120.3
Brazil *	146.1
Bulgaria *	354.7
Cameroon *	222.8
Canada *	293.2
Ivory Coast *	265.3
Chile *	166.7
China *	231.3
Colombia *	98.1
Congo	30.5
DR Congo *	4,746.3
Costa Rica	101.2
Croatia *	179.3
Cyprus *	159.6
Czech Republic *	254.4
Denmark *	133.2
Dominican Republic	136.2
Ecuador	221.4
Egypt *	201.4
El Salvador *	146.4
Eritrea *	215.0
Estonia *	295.9
Ethiopia *	389.9
Finland *	269.1
France *	170.5
Gabon *	204.5
Georgia *	244.3
Germany *	163.9
Ghana *	198.7
Greece *	137.8
Guatemala	153.3
Haiti *	159.4
Honduras *	202.3
Hong Kong *	91.4
Hungary *	178.4
Iceland *	401.4
India *	189.5
Indonesia *	239.3
Iran *	316.1
Ireland *	107.6
Israel *	141.3
Italy *	122.8
Jamaica	401.1
Japan *	154.0
Jordan *	253.1
Kazakhstan *	539.0
Kenya *	467.6
South Korea *	238.2
Kuwait *	481.0
Kyrgyzstan *	319.3
Latvia *	189.6
Lebanon *	327.0
Lithuania *	233.7
Luxembourg *	153.7
Malaysia *	257.5
Malta *	130.7
Mexico *	180.3
Moldova *	528.0
Mongolia *	334.5
Morocco *	96.4
Mozambique *	409.0
Namibia *	102.0
Nepal *	248.1
Netherlands *	172.4
New Zealand *	206.4
Nicaragua *	181.9
Nigeria *	776.6
North Macedonia *	222.1
Norway *	172.2
Oman *	361.6
Pakistan *	236.1
Panama	132.3
Paraguay *	155.9
Peru *	86.7
Philippines *	127.4
Poland *	212.2
Portugal *	138.2
Romania *	248.7
Russia *	519.0
Saudi Arabia *	448.0
Senegal *	155.1
Singapore *	213.8
Slovakia *	273.4
Slovenia *	190.2
South Africa *	265.1
Spain *	142.5
Sri Lanka *	120.8
Sudan *	266.7
Sweden *	216.9
Switzerland *	122.3
Syria *	294.3
Tajikistan *	486.3
Tanzania *	783.5
Thailand *	199.1
Togo	318.2
Trinidad and Tobago *	766.2
Tunisia *	123.3
Turkey *	167.1
Ukraine *	565.9
United Arab Emirates *	481.3
United Kingdom *	141.2
United States *	221.7
Uruguay *	94.5
Uzbekistan *	1,253.0
Venezuela *	434.2
Vietnam *	227.3
Yemen *	335.9
Zambia *	729.4
Zimbabwe *	374.6

== World energy intensity of GDP at purchasing parities from 2006 to 2009 ==
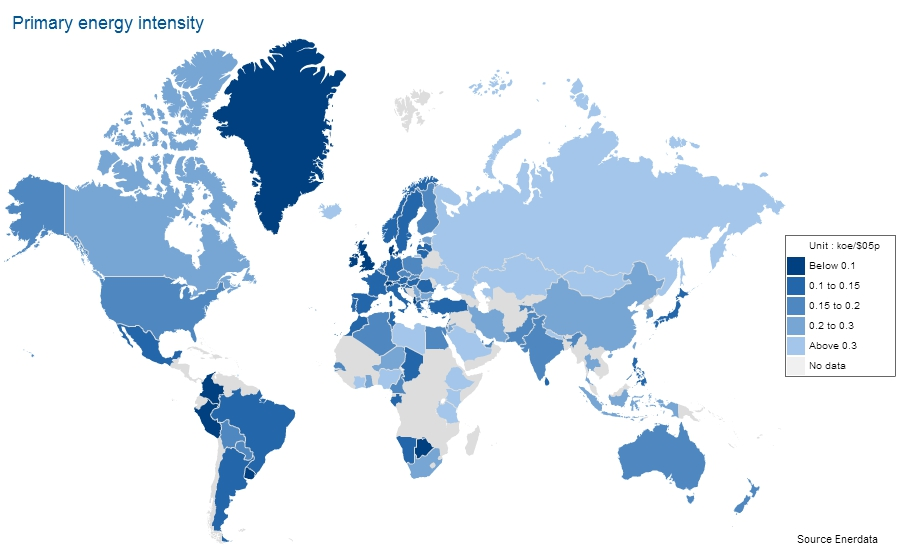
'Energy Intensity on the World for 2011' Figures provided by Enerdata. Energy intensity is also provided by country on the interactive yearbook interface. You will only need to zoom in the country selected.

The following table displays the energy intensity in the world by koe/$05p (Kilogram oil equivalent per USD at constant exchange rate, price and purchasing power parities of the year 2005), by region and by country. The energy intensity are published by Enerdata and they are also available in the energy review for 2011.

The energy intensity is the ratio of primary energy consumption over gross domestic product measured in constant US $ at purchasing power parities.

In 2009, energy intensity in OECD countries remained stable at 0.15 koe/$05p, with 0.12 koe/$05p in both the European Union and Japan and 0.17 koe/$05p in the USA. It remained particularly high in CIS (0.35 koe/$05p) as well as in Africa (0.25 koe/$05p) and Middle East (0.26 koe/$05p). In Asia, energy intensity reached 0.22 koe/$05p. On the opposite, Latin America posted a relatively low ratio of 0.14 koe/$05p.

Country	2006 koe/$05p	2007 koe/$05p	2008 koe/$05p	2009 koe/$05p
World	0.20	0.20	0.19	0.19
OECD	0.15	0.15	0.15	0.15
Europe	0.13	0.13	0.12	0.12
EU-27	0.13	0.13	0.12	0.12
Belgium	0.17	0.16	0.16	0.15
Spain	0.12	0.11	0.11	0.11
Finland	0.22	0.21	0.20	0.20
France	0.14	0.14	0.14	0.13
United Kingdom	0.11	0.10	0.10	0.10
Italy	0.11	0.10	0.11	0.10
Netherlands	0.13	0.13	0.13	0.13
Norway	0.13	0.12	0.12	0.12
Poland	0.18	0.17	0.16	0.15
Portugal	0.11	0.11	0.11	0.11
Czech Republic	0.21	0.19	0.19	0.19
Germany	0.13	0.12	0.12	0.12
Romania	0.18	0.17	0.15	0.14
Sweden	0.17	0.16	0.16	0.15
Turkey	0.11	0.12	0.11	0.11
North America	0.19	0.18	0.18	0.18
Canada	0.23	0.23	0.22	0.21
United States	0.18	0.18	0.18	0.17
CIS	0.39	0.36	0.35	0.35
Kazakhstan	0.44	0.42	0.43	0.45
Russia	0.37	0.34	0.33	0.32
Ukraine	0.49	0.45	0.43	0.44
Uzbekistan	0.87	0.80	0.76	0.73
Latin America	0.14	0.14	0.14	0.14
Mexico	0.13	0.13	0.13	0.14
Brazil	0.14	0.14	0.13	0.13
Argentina	0.15	0.15	0.14	0.14
Venezuela	0.22	0.21	0.20	0.21
Chile	0.15	0.14	0.14	0.14
Colombia	0.09	0.08	0.08	0.09
Asia	0.23	0.22	0.22	0.22
China	0.32	0.30	0.28	0.28
Japan	0.13	0.13	0.13	0.12
India	0.21	0.20	0.20	0.20
South Korea	0.19	0.19	0.19	0.19
Taiwan	0.29	0.28	0.27	0.28
Thailand	0.23	0.22	0.22	0.23
Indonesia	0.24	0.24	0.24	0.24
Malaysia	0.21	0.22	0.21	0.22
Australasia	0.18	0.18	0.18	0.18
Australia	0.18	0.18	0.18	0.18
New Zealand	0.17	0.16	0.16	0.17
Africa	0.26	0.25	0.25	0.25
South Africa	0.31	0.31	0.31	0.31
Nigeria	0.40	0.39	0.38	0.36
Egypt	0.18	0.18	0.18	0.18
Algeria	0.14	0.15	0.15	0.16
Middle-East	0.26	0.26	0.26	0.26
Saudi Arabia	0.29	0.29	0.30	0.32
Iran	0.25	0.25	0.25	0.24
United Arab Emirates	0.21	0.22	0.24	0.25
Kuwait	0.21	0.21	0.21	0.24

== See also ==
- List of countries by energy consumption and production
- List of countries by carbon intensity
- List of countries by energy consumption per capita
- List of countries by renewable electricity production

== Sources ==
- "Data Tables". Earth Trends. Archived from the original on 2008-05-16.
- "Global Energy Statistical Yearbook 2011". Enerdata. Archived from the original on 2013-02-27.
