= Electric energy consumption =

Worldwide consumption of electricity

Electricity consumption by region. By 2025, Asia is projected to account for half of the world’s electricity consumption, with one-third of global electricity to be consumed in China.

Electric energy consumption is energy consumption in the form of electrical energy. Approximately one-fifth of global energy is consumed as electricity: for residential, industrial, commercial, transportation and other purposes. The global electricity consumption in 2022 was 24,398 terawatt-hours (TWh), almost exactly three times the amount of consumption in 1981 (8,132 TWh). China, the United States, and India accounted for more than half of the global share of electricity consumption. Japan and Russia followed with nearly twice the consumption of the remaining industrialized countries.

While power is measured in watts (W) or kilowatts (kW), energy consumption is typically measured in watt-hours (Wh) or kilowatt-hours (kWh), following the fundamental relation:

$$\text{E = P × t}$$

where E is energy, P is power, and t is time.

== Overview ==
Electric energy is most often measured either in joules (J), or in watt hours (W·h).

1 W·s = 1 J
1 W·h = 3,600 W·s = 3,600 J
1 kWh = 3,600 kWs = 1,000 Wh = 3.6 million W·s = 3.6 million J

Electric and electronic devices consume electric energy to generate desired output (light, heat, motion, etc.). During operation, some part of the energy is lost depending on the electrical efficiency.

Electricity has been generated in power stations since 1882. The invention of the steam turbine in 1884 to drive the electric generator led to an increase in worldwide electricity consumption.

In 2022, the total worldwide electricity production was nearly 29,000 TWh. Total primary energy is converted into numerous forms, including, but not limited to, electricity, heat and motion. Some primary energy is lost during the conversion to electricity, as seen in the United States, where a little more than 60% was lost in 2022.

In 2022, electricity accounted for more than 20% of global final energy consumption, while oil made up less than 40%, coal less than 9%, natural gas less than 15%, biofuels and waste less than 10%, and other sources (such as heat, solar, wind, and geothermal energy) more than 5%.

That year, total final electricity consumption was distributed unevenly across sectors: industry (42.2%), residential (26.8%), commercial and public services (21.1%), transport (1.8%), and other sectors such as agriculture and fishing (8.1%). In 1981, final electricity consumption continued to decline in the industrial sector, while it increased in the residential, commercial, and public services sectors.

A sensitivity analysis on an adaptive neuro-fuzzy network model for electric demand estimation shows that employment is the most critical factor influencing electrical consumption. The study used six parameters as input data, employment, GDP, dwelling, population, heating degree day and cooling degree day, with electricity demand as output variable.

== World electricity consumption ==
The table lists 45 electricity-consuming countries, which used about 22,000 TWh. These countries comprise about 90% of the final consumption of 190+ countries. The final consumption to generate this electricity is provided for every country. The data is from 2022.

In 2022, OECD's final electricity consumption was over 10,000 TWh. In that year, the industrial sector consumed about 42.2% of the electricity, with the residential sector consuming nearly 26.8%, the commercial and public services sectors consuming about 21.1%, the transport sector consuming nearly 1.8%, and the other sectors (such as agriculture and fishing) consuming nearly 8.1%. In recent decades, the consumption in the residential and commercial and public services sectors has grown, while the industry consumption has declined. More recently, the transport sector has witnessed an increase in consumption with the growth in the electric vehicle market.

Electricity consumption of selected countries (OECD, 2022)
Rank	Country	Final consumption (TWh)	Population (millions)	Per capita consumption (MWh)
—	WORLD	24,398	7,960	3.07
1	China	7,214	1,443	5
2	United States	4,272	336	12.71
3	India	1,403	1,401	1
4	Japan	1,132	126	8.98
5	Russia	934	146	6.4
6	Canada	595	38.1	15.62
7	South Korea	553	51.2	10.8
8	Brazil	550	215	2.56
9	Germany	539	82.2	6.55
10	France	463	67.7	6.84
11	Saudi Arabia	317	36	8.81
12	United Kingdom	312	68.4	4.56
13	Indonesia	308	276	1.17
14	Italy	300	60	5
15	Mexico	296	127	2.33
16	Iran	280	83.3	3.36
17	Turkey	264	84	3.14
18	Taiwan	257	23.8	10.8
19	Spain	246	46.8	5.26
20	South Africa	233	60	3.88
21	Australia	225	26	8.65
22	Vietnam	220	100	2.2
23	Thailand	203	70	2.9
24	Malaysia	170	33.2	5.12
25	Egypt	168	105	1.6
26	Poland	156	37.5	4.17
27	Ukraine	154	43.2	3.56
28	Sweden	147	10.2	14.4
29	Argentina	138	46	3
30	United Arab Emirates	136	10.2	13.33
31	Norway	128	5.5	23.27
32	Pakistan	124	226	0.55
33	Netherlands	120	17.5	6.86
34	Belgium	98	11.8	8.33
35	Finland	90	5.6	16.03
36	Chile	84	19.2	4.38
37	Kazakhstan	75	18.7	4
38	Austria	73	9.1	8.02
39	Venezuela	72	28.1	2.56
40	Algeria	66	44	1.5
41	Switzerland	62	9.3	6.67
42	Israel	59	9.4	6.27
43	New Zealand	43	5	8.6
44	Denmark	35	5.8	6.02
45	Ireland	28	5.5	5.1

Share of electricity production from renewables

=== Consumption per capita ===
The final consumption divided by the number of inhabitants provides a country's consumption per capita. In Western Europe, this is between 4 and 8 MWh/year. (1 MWh = 1,000 kWh) In Scandinavia, the United States, Canada, Taiwan, South Korea, Australia, Japan and the United Kingdom, the per capita consumption is higher; however, in developing countries, it is much lower. The world's average was about 3 MWh/year in 2022. Very low consumption levels, such as those in Philippines, not included in the table, indicate that many inhabitants are not connected to the electricity grid, and that is the reason why some of the world's most populous countries, including Nigeria and Bangladesh, do not appear in the table.

== Electricity generation and GDP ==
The table lists 30 countries, which represent about 76% of the world population, 84% of the world GDP, and 85% of the world electricity generation. Productivity per electricity generation (concept similar to energy intensity) can be measured by dividing GDP over the electricity generated. The data is from 2019.

Electricity generation (2019) and GDP (PPP) (2019)

Country	Population, millions	rank*	GDP (PPP), billions (USD)	rank*	GDP (PPP) per capita	rank*	Electricity generation (GWh/yr)	rank*	GDP (PPP) /kWh*
China	1,407	1	$14,280	2	$10,149	15	7,503,428	1	$1.9
India	1,366	2	$2,871	6	$2,102	26	1,603,675	3	$1.8
USA	328	3	$21,433	1	$65,345	1	4,411,159	2	$4.9
Indonesia	270.6	4	$1,119	16	$4,135	20	278,942	17	$4.0
Brazil	211	6	$1,878	9	$8,900	18	626,328	7	$3.0
Pakistan	216.6	5	$279	26	$1,288	28	138,626	24	$2.0
Bangladesh	163	8	$302	25	$1,853	27	89,672	27	$3.4
Nigeria	201	7	$448	22	$2,229	25	33,552	28	$13.4
Russia	144	9	$1,687	11	$11,715	14	1,118,143	4	$1.5
Japan	126	11	$5,149	3	$40,865	7	1,030,286	5	$5.0
Mexico	127.6	10	$1,269	15	$9,945	16	322,584	13	$3.9
Philippines	108	13	$377	23	$3,491	21	106,041	26	$3.6
Vietnam	96.5	15	$262	27	$2,715	24	227,461	21	$1.2
Ethiopia	112	12	$96	29	$857	29	14,553	29	$6.6
Egypt	100.4	14	$303	24	$3,018	23	200,563	22	$1.5
Germany	83	18	$3,888	4	$46,843	4	609,406	8	$6.4
Turkey	83.5	17	$761	19	$9,114	17	303,898	15	$2.5
DR Congo	86.8	16	$50	30	$576	30	9,990	30	$5.0
Iran	83	19	$258	28	$3,108	22	318,696	14	$0.8
Thailand	69.6	20	$544	21	$7,816	19	186,503	23	$2.9
France	67.3	21	$2,729	7	$40,550	8	562,842	10	$4.8
UK	66.8	22	$2,879	5	$43,099	6	324,761	12	$8.9
Italy	59.7	23	$2,009	8	$33,652	9	293,853	16	$6.8
South Korea	51.7	24	$1,651	12	$31,934	10	585,301	9	$2.8
Spain	47.1	25	$1,393	13	$29,575	11	267,501	19	$5.2
Canada	37.6	26	$1,742	10	$46,330	5	648,676	6	$2.7
Saudi Arabia	34.3	27	$793	18	$23,120	13	343,661	11	$2.3
Taiwan	23.6	28	$605	20	$25,636	12	274,059	18	$2.2
Australia	25.4	29	$1,392	14	$54,803	2	265,901	20	$5.2
Netherlands	17.3	30	$910	17	$52,601	3	121,062	25	$7.5
World	7,683	—	$87,555	—	$11,395	—	27,044,191	—	$3.5
Population data is from the World Bank; GDP data is from the World Bank; Electricity data is from BP Global; rank* of Population, GDP, and Electricity generation are rankings within this list; GDP (PPP) / kWh is the amount of GDP (PPP) (USD) produced per kilowatt-hour

== Electricity consumption by sector ==
The table below lists the 15 countries with the highest final electricity consumption, which comprised more than 70% of the global consumption in 2022.

Electricity final consumption by sector (2022)
Country/ Geographical region	Total (TWh)	Industry	Transport	Commercial /Public services	Residential	Agriculture /Forestry	Other
China	7,214	59.9%	2.4%	7.3%	16.4%	2.2%	11.8%
United States	4,272	19.9%	0.6%	35.2%	37.4%	2.1%	4.8%
India	1,403	37.7%	11.2%	7.8%	21.7%	15.9%	5.7%
Japan	1,132	37%	1.8%	33.7%	27.1%	0.3%	0.1%
Russia	934	44.8%	11.1%	20.4%	21.1%	2.5%	0.1%
Canada	595	35.9%	1.5%	28.1%	32.5%	2.0%	0%
South Korea	553	52.3%	0.6%	31.4%	12.7%	2.5%	0.5%
Brazil	550	38.3%	0.7%	27.3%	27.7%	6%	0%
Germany	539	44.8%	2.3%	26.4%	25.4%	1.1%	0%
France	463	26.9%	2.4%	31.5%	37%	1.9%	0.3%
Saudi Arabia	317	33.7%	3.9%	28.3%	25%	4.1%	5%
United Kingdom	312	18.3%	2.2%	38.2%	39.1%	2%	0.2%
Italy	300	30%	5%	32%	30%	1%	2%
Mexico	296	29%	4%	33%	30%	3%	1%
Iran	280	24%	6%	37%	25%	5%	3%
World	24,398	42.2%	1.8%	21.1%	26.8%	3.1%	5%

Electricity consumption by sector in New Zealand

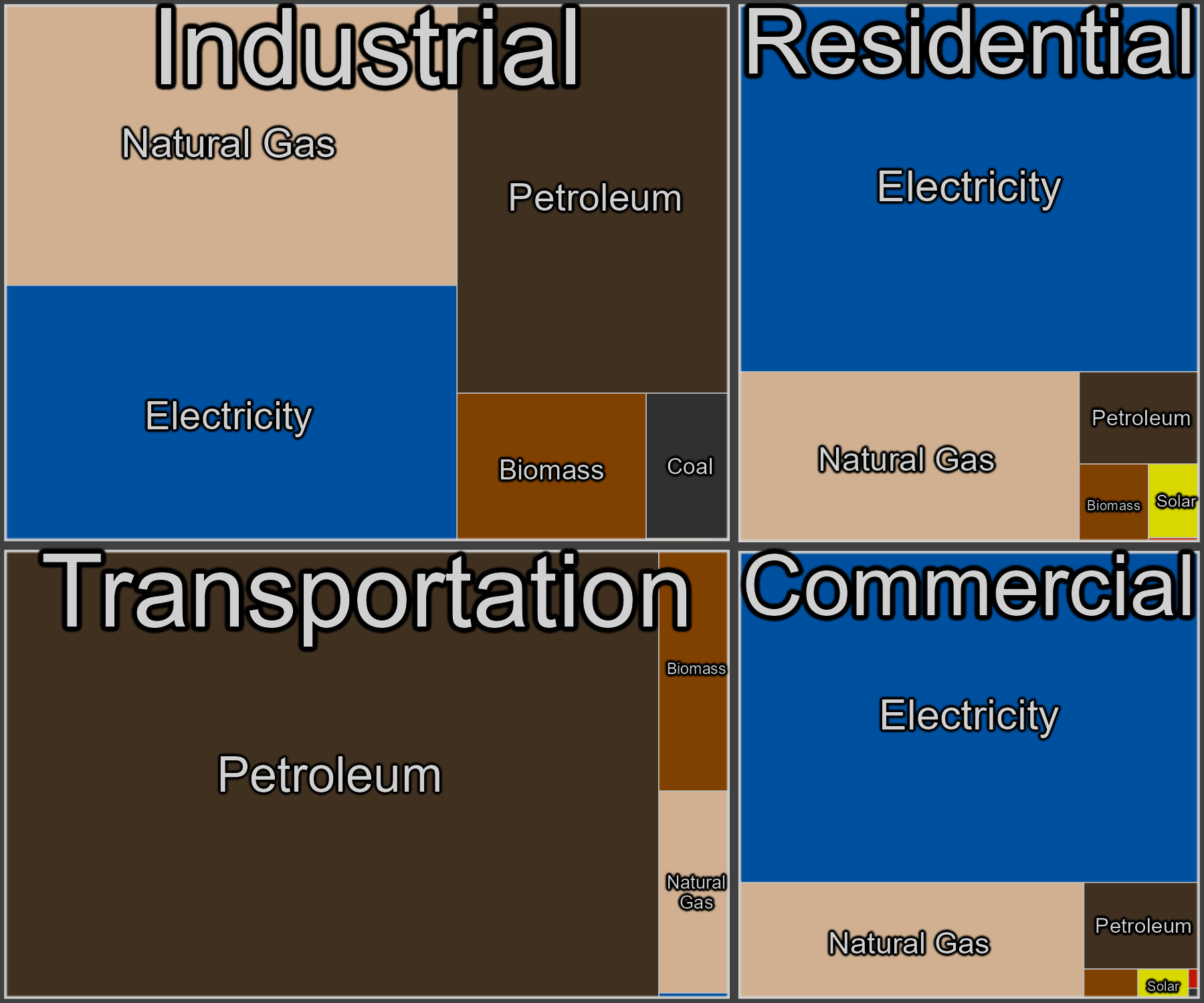
Treemap showing U.S. energy consumption by sector and source in 2021

== Electricity outlook ==
Looking forward, increasing energy efficiency will result in less electricity needed for a given demand in power, but demand will increase strongly on the account of:

- Economic growth in developing countries, and
- Electrification of transport and heating. Combustion engines are replaced by electric drive and for heating less gas and oil, but more electricity is used, if possible with heat pumps.

The International Energy Agency expects revisions of subsidies for fossil fuels which amounted to $550 billion in 2013, more than four times renewable energy subsidies. In this scenario, almost half of the increase in 2040 of electricity consumption is covered by more than 80% growth of renewable energy. Many new nuclear plants will be constructed, mainly to replace old ones. The nuclear part of electricity generation will increase from 11 to 12%. The renewable part goes up much more, from 21 to 33%. The IEA warns that in order to restrict global warming to 2 °C, carbon dioxide emissions must not exceed 1000 gigaton (Gt) from 2014. This limit is reached in 2040 and emissions will not drop to zero ever.

The World Energy Council sees world electricity consumption increasing to more than 40,000 TWh/a in 2040. The fossil part of generation depends on energy policy. It can stay around 70% in the so-called "Jazz" scenario where countries rather independently "improvise" but it can also decrease to around 40% in the "Symphony" scenario if countries work "orchestrated" for more climate friendly policy. Carbon dioxide emissions, 32 Gt/a in 2012, will increase to 46 Gt/a in Jazz but decrease to 26 Gt/a in Symphony. Accordingly, until 2040 the renewable part of generation will stay at about 20% in Jazz but increase to about 45% in Symphony.

An EU survey conducted on climate and energy consumption in 2022 found that 63% of people in the European Union want energy costs to be dependent on use, with the greatest consumers paying more. This is compared to 83% in China, 63% in the UK and 57% in the US. 24% of Americans surveyed believing that people and businesses should do more to cut their own usage (compared to 20% in the UK, 19% in the EU, and 17% in China).

Nearly half of those polled in the European Union (47%) and the United Kingdom (45%) want their government to focus on the development of renewable energies. This is compared to 37% in both the United States and China when asked to list their priorities on energy.

The United States is on track to break electricity consumption records in 2025 and 2026, according to the U.S. Energy Information Administration’s (EIA) Short-Term Energy Outlook, released in February 2025. With demand from data centers powering artificial intelligence and cryptocurrency operations, alongside rising electricity use in homes and businesses for heating and transportation, the EIA projects total power consumption will hit 4,179 billion kilowatt-hours (kWh) in 2025 and 4,239 billion kWh in 2026—both surpassing the current record of 4,082 billion kWh set in 2024. The forecasted increase can be broken down as follows: residential electricity sales will climb to 1,524 billion kWh in 2025, commercial demand to 1,458 billion kWh, and industrial usage to 1,054 billion kWh. This would mark new highs for the commercial sector, which set its current record of 1,421 billion kWh in 2024, and for residential consumers, whose last peak was 1,509 billion kWh in 2022. Meanwhile, the industrial sector—historically the largest consumer of electricity—remains just below its all-time high of 1,064 billion kWh set in 2000. As AI, cryptocurrency mining, and electrification continue to drive demand, the U.S. power grid faces mounting pressure to keep pace with this record surge in electricity consumption.

== See also ==
- Electricity generation
- Electricity retailing
- List of countries by energy intensity
- List of countries by carbon dioxide emissions
- List of countries by electricity consumption
- List of countries by electricity production
- List of countries by energy consumption per capita
- List of countries by greenhouse gas emissions
- List of countries by renewable electricity production
- List of countries by energy consumption and production
- World energy supply and consumption
