= Renewable energy in Israel =

Renewable energy in Israel accounts for 12.5% of energy consumption in 2023. Israel aims to reach 30% renewable energy consumption by 2030. In 2023 Israel required all non-private buildings to cover rooftops with solar panels. On 12 March 2024, renewable energy accounted for more than half of Israeli energy production; this lasted for a few minutes.

== Solar energy ==
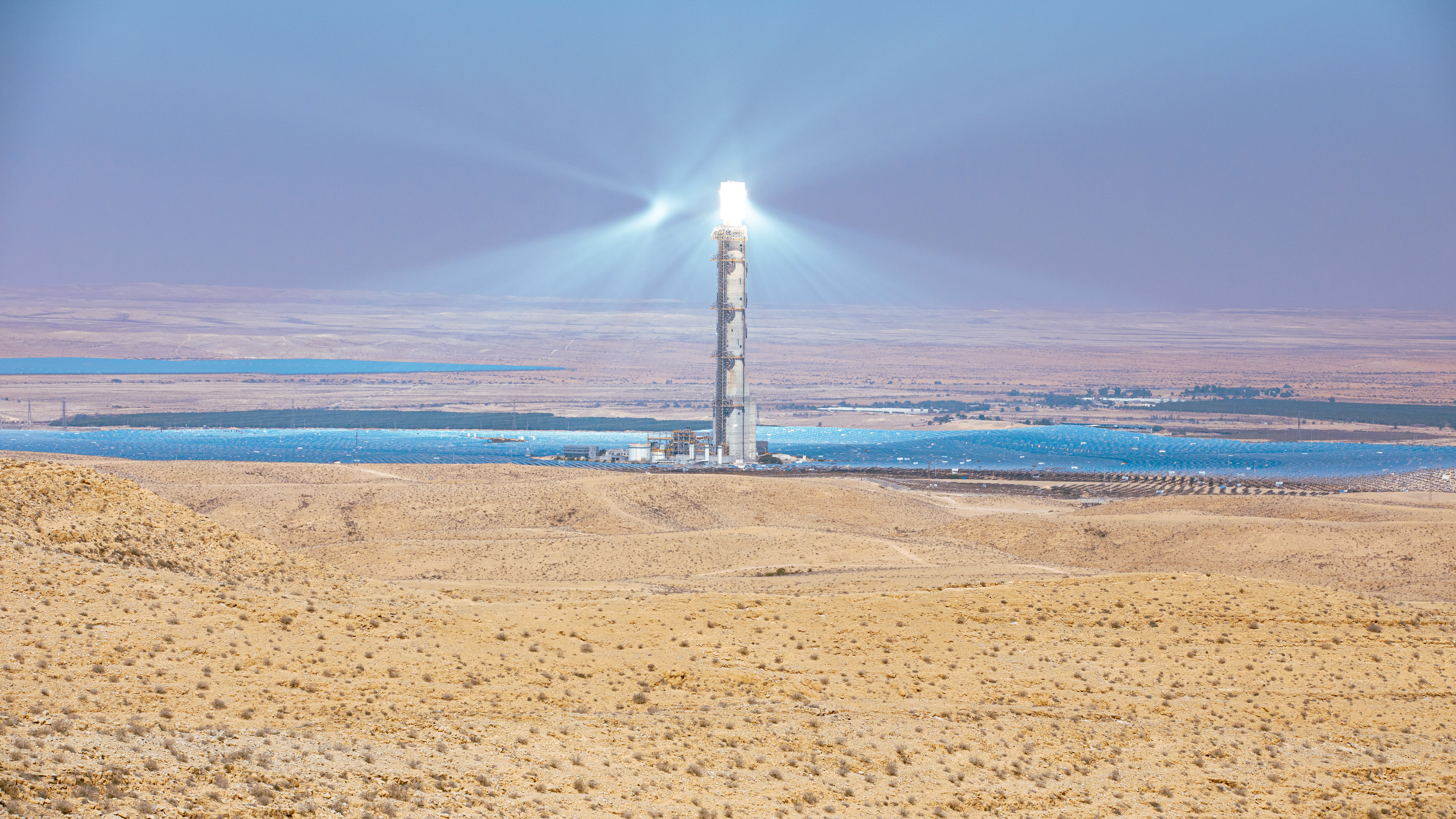
Ashalim Solar power station

Israel is a sunny country, with 300 days of sun on average each year. The Negev desert is Israel's primary solar research center. It hosts the National Solar Energy Center, the Jacob Blaustein Institutes for Desert Research. It is also the prime region of Israel solar energy production. The Rotem plant and the Tze'elim solar field are examples of solar plants in the Negev. The Israeli Negev was also the testing site for Californian solar technology. Israel has high solar potential. The Weizmann Institute estimated that Israel can meet 32% of its energy demands if it covered roof tops with solar panels. In 2023 Israel required all non-private buildings cover their rooftops with solar panels.

== Wind energy ==
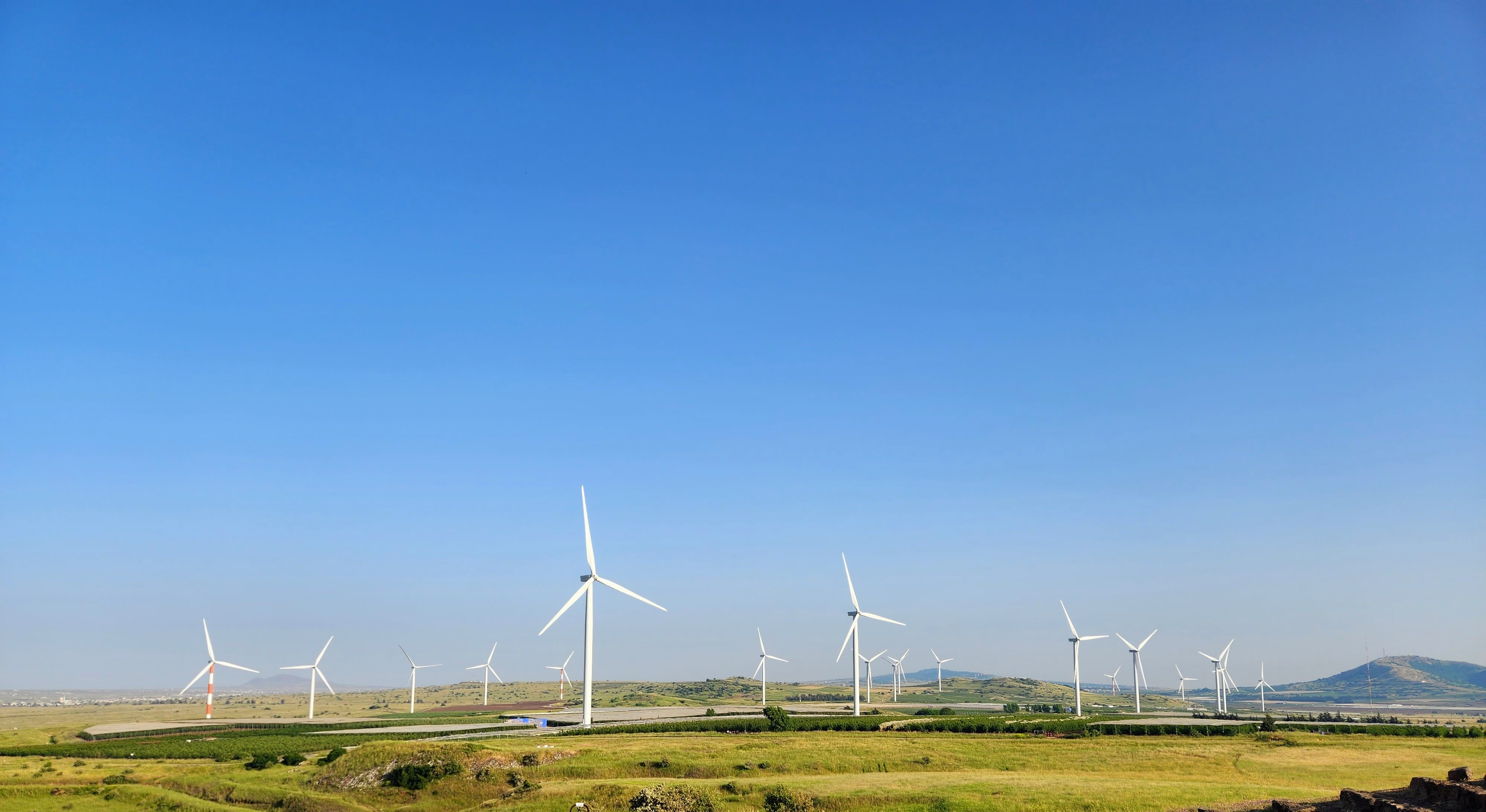
Wind turbines in the North of Israel

In Israel's northern mountainous region are located wind turbines. The Israeli company Enlight operates the Genesis Wind complex: 34 General Electric turbines which can produce 180MW. Five additional turbines can be added raising capacity to 207MW. Emek HaBacha provides 109MW. Gilboa provides 11.9MW.

== Biomass ==
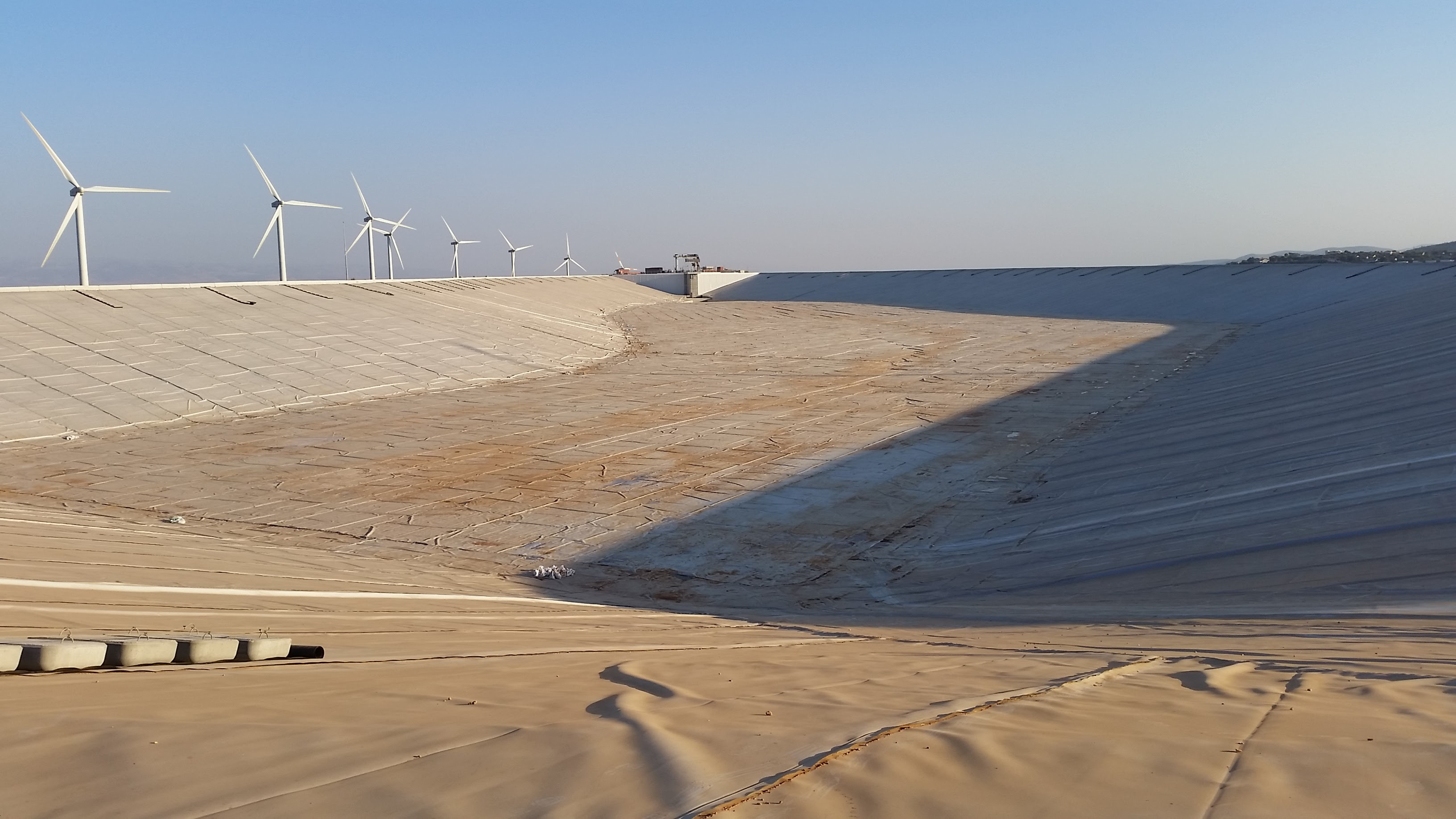
Pumped-storage hydroelectricity

There are two biomass types used in Israel: biomass combustion and biogas. As of 2020, biogas produces 30MW for the Israeli energy grid.

== Hydropower ==
Due to the limited availability of water resources, there is limited production of energy from Hydraulic sources. In total, hydropower centers in the Galilee produce 10MW. Despite limitations, Israel is expecting to increase the hydro power sourced energy to 800MW through a water storage facility in the Israeli North. In Kohav HaYarden Israel is building a plant capable of producing 344MW.

== See also ==
- Renewable energy in Palestine
