= Energy in Burundi =

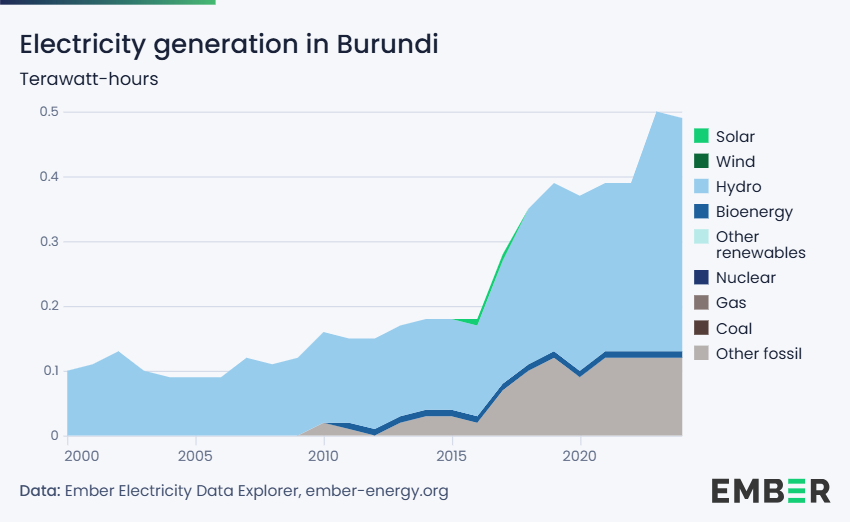
Electricity generation in Burundi in terawatt-hours

Energy in Burundi is a growing industry.

As of 2020, Burundi consumes a total of 382.70 million kilowatt hours (kWh) of electric energy per year.

The country produces locally 69% of the electricity it consumes, with the rest imported from other countries. Its most important power source is hydroelectric power, representing 95% of total production. It also uses energy from other renewable sources (wind, solar, biomass, and geothermal) and coal power plants.

Burundi has the world's lowest carbon footprint per capita at 0.027 tons per capita in CO_{2} emissions as of 2019.

== Electricity ==
Burundi's total production of electricity was of 232 gigawatt hours (GWh) in 2018. The main source came from a total of nine dams supplying the major part of the electric energy and 100 GWh coming from geothermal and thermal sources. Consumption in 2018 was estimated at 315.6 GWh of which 273 GWh where consumed in Bujumbura, 18.7 GWh in Gitega and 23.9 GWh by the rest of the country.
