= Renewable energy in French Polynesia =

Approximately 6% of primary energy in French Polynesia is generated from renewable energy sources. Approximately 30% of electricity is generated renewably, primarily Hydroelectricity and solar power. Renewable generation is concentrated on Tahiti, with other parts of French Polynesia almost entirely reliant on fossil fuels. Wind power is not used, with only two small facilities, both of which became non-functional due to lack of maintenance.

In December 2013 the Assembly of French Polynesia adopted a Law on the Guiding Principles of the Energy Policy of French Polynesia, requiring that a minimum of 50% of electricity be generated from renewable sources by 2020. This was replaced in November 2015 by the 2015-2030 Energy Transition Plan (PTE), which set a target of 75% renewables by 2030. The ETP was replaced in February 2022 by a multi-annual energy plan (PPE), and the 75% by 2030 target was retained.

In July 2016 the government announced that hybrid solar PV / battery / diesel power plants would be constructed on eight remote islands. In April 2021 the government called for tenders for 30MW of solar farms with batteries for Tahiti. Winners of the tenders were announced in March 2022.

In September 2022 Électricité de Tahiti performed a test to run the island of Tahiti entirely on renewables for an hour, using hydroelectricity and photovoltaics, with the Putu Uira battery system stabilising the grid. This was followed by a longer test a week later. Following the test EDT announced that would increasingly rely on renewables to power Tahiti during periods of good weather and low demand.

In July 2021 the French government agreed to provide a 7.1 billion XPF energy transition fund to decarbonise electricity production, particularly on remote islands. An agreement to implement the fund was signed in February 2023.
