= Energy in Belize =

Belize electricity supply by source (1980-2018)

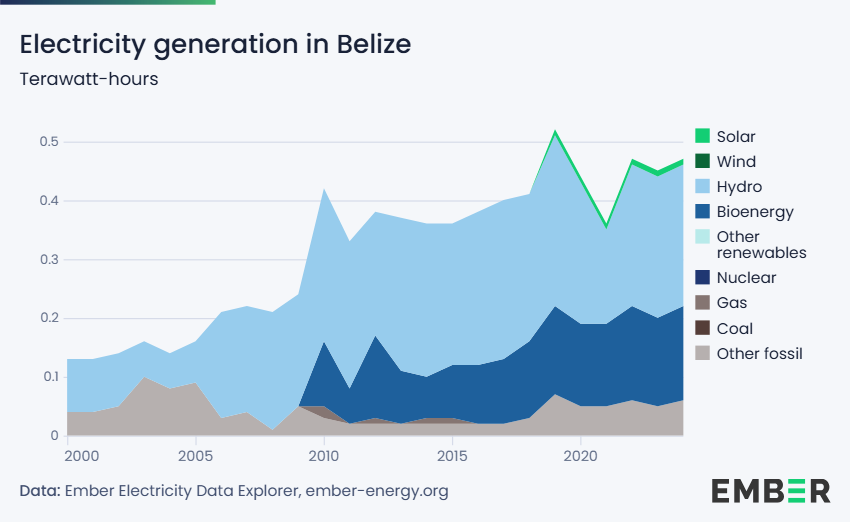
Electricity generation in Belize in terawatt-hours (2000-2024)

Energy in Belize is based on four main sources: imported fossil fuels, biomass, hydro, and imported electricity.

== Energy sources ==
Belize currently imports 100% of its fossil fuel use. Under the San Jose Pact, which Belize signed onto in 1988, Mexico and Venezuela signed a treaty obligating them to offer a concessionary credit from 20-25% of the purchase price of their oil exports. In 1991, both countries increased the oil supply offered under this agreement. However, fuel prices had jumped to a record high in 2008, over $10 per gallon.

Since 1981, extensive drilling has occurred throughout Belize to find oil deposits. Near Spanish Lookout and northwest of Belmopan, two oil fields were located. Drilling in these two fields began in 2005 and was predicted to reach a peak by 2010.

== Sustainable energy ==
Sustainable energy is the main goal for Belize. In 2003, the Public Utilities Commission implemented a one-year project entitled Formulation for a National Energy Plan for Belize. The project, funded by the United Nations Development Fund, developed a comprehensive National Energy Policy to promote environmentally sound, safe, reliable, affordable energy. In 2011 this plan was updated with the Framework for the National Energy Policy. The Ministry of Energy, Science & Technology, and Public Utilities was founded following recommendations from the framework.

Belize has also taken a role in reducing greenhouse gas emissions. The Belize and Nicaragua Logs Recovery project aims to reduce greenhouse gas emissions and prevent deforestation by salvaging mahogany and other logs in the Belize and Nicaragua Rivers.

Also, in compliance with the United Nations’ program REDD, Reduction of Emissions from Deforestation and forest Degradation, a national workshop performing with the Ministry of Natural Resources and Environment and the Forest Department of Belize are coordinating efforts to forest management and reduction of deforestation. Along with signing the San Jose Pact, Belize has also been a participant to the Kyoto Protocol.
