= Renewable energy in Azerbaijan =

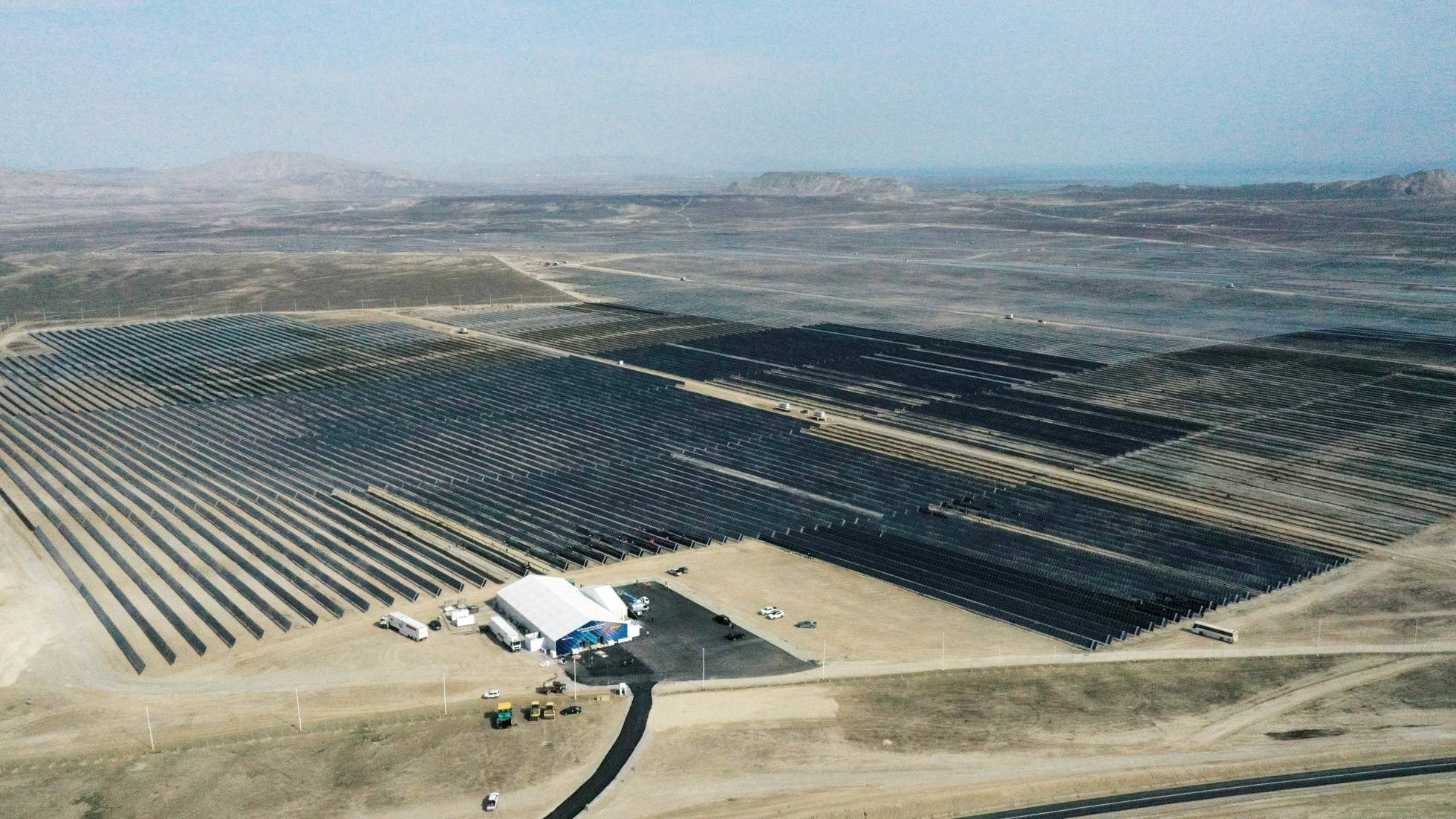
Garadagh Solar Power Plant 2023

Gas and oil make up two-thirds of Azerbaijan's GDP, making it one of the top ten most fossil fuel-dependent economies in the world. Azerbaijan has some renewable energy projects. These include hydropower, wind, and solar and biomass power plants.

The country's currently installed renewable energy capacity is 4.5 MW. Azerbaijan began installment of its first major solar plant in 2023. The government of Azerbaijan aims to increase share of renewables in total electricity production to 30% by 2030.

To accelerate investments and production in renewable energy, Azerbaijan is offering the following tax incentives:

- exemption for income of private electricity production by residential consumers (from renewable energy sources with a capacity limit of up to 150 kW);
- profit of renewable energy producers based on Public Private Partnership or Power Purchase Agreements up to 30 years is exempted from income tax (personal income tax and corporate income taxes);
- VAT and customs duties for the import of machinery, technological equipment, and devices by renewable energy producers based on Public Private Partnership or Power Purchase Agreements up to 30 years, for the production of renewable energy not less than the capacity requirement set by the Cabinet of Ministers;
- Property tax for the property used for the purposes of renewable energy production based on Public Private Partnership or Power Purchase Agreements up to 30 years is exempted from income tax (personal income tax and corporate income taxes);
- Land tax for the lands used by the renewable energy production projects based on Public Private Partnership or Power Purchase Agreements up to 30 years is exempted from income tax (personal income tax and corporate income taxes);

== Renewable energy sources in Azerbaijan ==
Azerbaijan’s renewable energy sources are hydropower, wind, solar, and biomass power plants. Together, these generated 1.48 billion kilowatt-hours (kWh) of energy in 2018, comprising almost 9% of the total production of 17.2 billion kWh.

=== Solar ===
Solar Power Plants of 20 MW and over include:

- Garadagh Solar Power Plant – 230 MW
- Nakhchivan Solar Power Plant – 20 MW
- Gobustan Solar Power Plant – 100 MW

=== Windmills ===
Azerbaijan is one of those countries where windmills could be a perfect fit due to its geographical location. In particular, the Absheron peninsula, the coastline of the Caspian Sea and islands in the northwestern part of the Caspian Sea, the Ganja-Dashkesan zone in the west of Azerbaijan and the Sharur-Julfa area of the Nakhchivan Autonomous Republic are favorable areas. In 1999, Japan's Tomen Company, together with the Azerbaijan Scientific Research Institute of Power Engineering and Energy, installed two towers with 30 and 40 meters in Absheron, average annual wind speed was determined to be 7.9-8.1 m/sec and feasibility study about the installation of windmills with a total capacity of 30 MWt had been prepared in Qobustan region.

=== Hydroelectric energy ===
The production of electricity from this hydropower is being increased since 1990. The percentage of production power of hydroelectric power plants is currently 17.8 percent in the total energy system of the Republic. There was no connection between Nakhchivan Autonomous Republic's energy system and the main energy system of the Republic, that is why medium, small and micro hydroelectric power stations need to be set up in the Nakhchivan Autonomous Republic.

== State Agency on Alternative and Renewable Energy Sources ==
The State Agency on Alternative and Renewable Energy Sources of the Republic of Azerbaijan was established by the Decree of the President of Azerbaijan dated 1 February 2013, for improving the management system in the field of alternative and renewable energy.

The Charter of the State Agency on Alternative and Renewable Energy Sources was approved by the Decree of the Head of State on 1 February 2013.

== Annual report ==
In 2014, 1480.0 million kWh of electricity was generated in the country by all renewable energy sources. This, according to estimated calculations, along with saving of 298,5 thousand tons of mazut or 429.2 million m^{3} of natural gas, prevents spreading to the atmosphere 919,400 tonnes or 763,900 tonnes of carbon dioxide (CO_{2}).

In 2015, 1816.0 million kilowatt/hours of electricity was generated by all alternative and renewable energy sources (21.5 percent more than in the previous year), and 6315.3 percent of thermal energy (15.9 percent more than in the previous year). This has resulted on savings of 464.7 million m^{3} of natural gas on average and, prevents spreading to the atmosphere 827.2 thousand tons of carbon dioxide (CO_{2}) (Calculated based on “ The method of calculating the amount of gases the thermal effect spreading to atmosphere” approved by the Ministry of Ecology and Natural Resources dated 18 January 2006)

According to collecting data from the preliminary official statistical and economic subjects, in 2016, 2,141.9 million kilowatt/hours electricity, or 9.3 percent of 23,073.9 million kilowatt/hours of electricity produced by the all sources in country were the total amount of alternative and renewable energy sources. Compared with the previous year, the total production of electricity amounted to 100.8%, and its production on The State Agency for Alternative and Renewable Energy Sources was 117.1%. 4212.4 Gcal of thermal energy was generated on the State Agency for Alternative and Renewable Energy Sources, which means an increase of 2.0% compared to the previous year. Efficient utilization of State Agency for Alternative and Renewable Energy Sources has resulted 548.7 million m^{3} of natural gas savings and, to prevent spreading to the atmosphere 976.7 thousand tons of carbon dioxide (CO_{2}) (Calculated based on “The method of calculating the amount of gases the thermal effect spreading to atmosphere” approved by the Ministry of Ecology and Natural Resources dated 18 January 2006)

== See also ==
- Natural Resources of Azerbaijan
- Energy in Azerbaijan
