= List of countries by energy consumption and production =

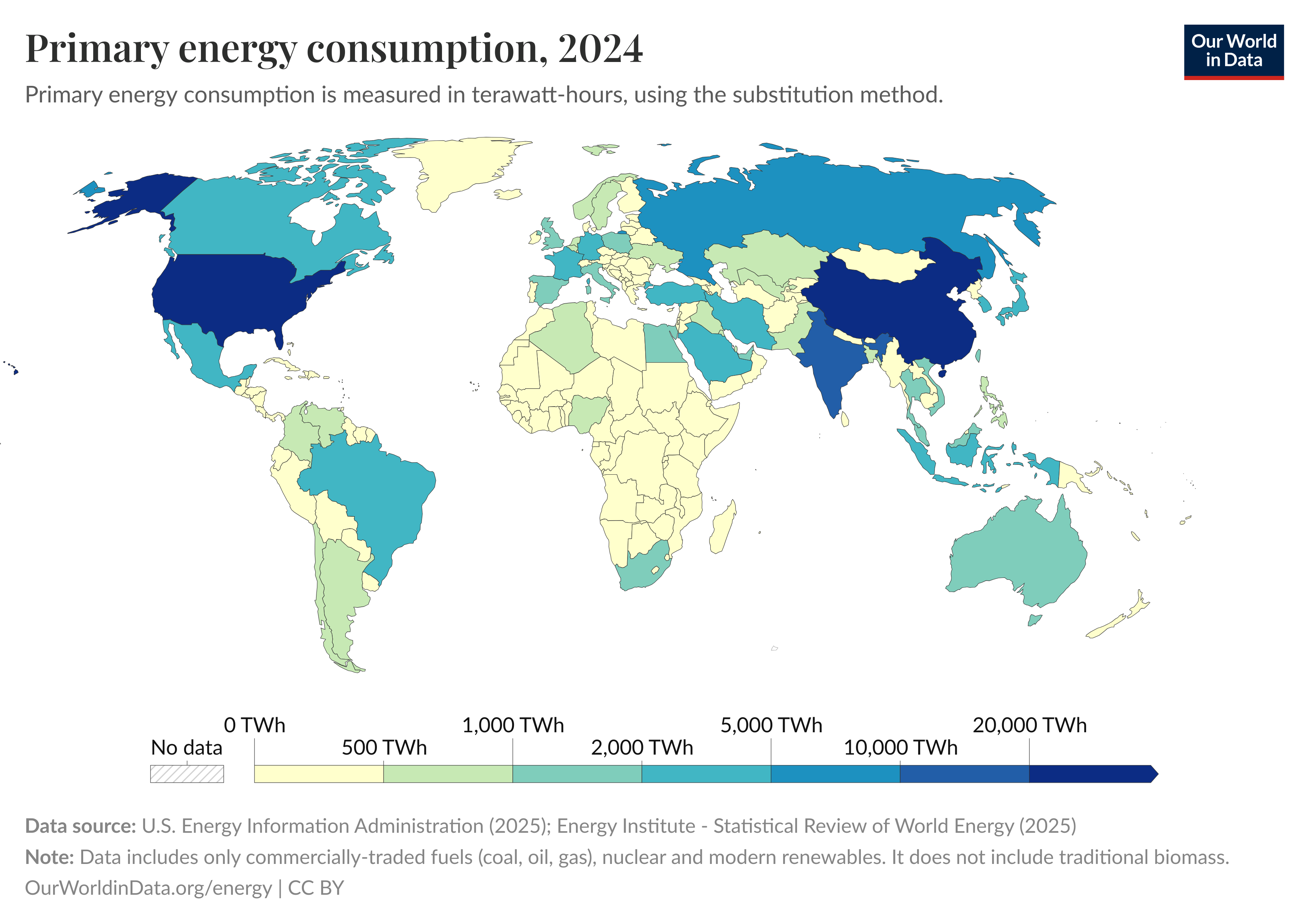
World energy consumption by country in 2024

This is a list of countries by total primary energy consumption and production.

1 quadrillion BTU = 293 terawatt-hour (TWh) = 1.055 exajoule (EJ)
1 quadrillion BTU/yr = 1.055 EJ/yr = 293 TWh/yr = 33.433 gigawatt (GW)

The numbers below are for the total energy consumption or production in a whole year, so should be multiplied by 33.433 to get the average value in GW in that year.

== List ==
Primary energy consumption and production by country in quadrillion BTU.
Country	2022		2018		2014	
Country	Production	Consumption	Production	Consumption	Production	Consumption
Afghanistan	0.104	0.11	0.066	0.11	0.056	0.091
Albania	0.067	0.086	0.058	0.096	0.065	0.088
Algeria	6.719	2.626	6.751	2.518	6.56	2.298
American Samoa	0	0.005	0	0.005	0	0.005
Angola	2.751	0.342	3.793	0.304	3.722	0.352
Antigua and Barbuda		0.011		0.01	0	0.01
Argentina	3.399	3.447	3.133	3.394	2.929	3.619
Armenia	0.039	0.169	0.03	0.133	0.033	0.138
Aruba	0.001	0.017	0.001	0.017	0.001	0.017
Australia	17.824	3.447	17.161	3.394	14.88	5.436
Austria	0.245	1.113	0.287	1.213	0.299	1.159
Azerbaijan	2.703	0.637	2.402	0.597	2.471	0.576
Bahamas, The		0.047		0.055	0	0.05
Bahrain	1.086	0.081	1.034	0.722	1.025	0.689
Bangladesh	0.948	1.657	1.063	1.478	0.909	1.2
Barbados	0.002	0.019	0.003	0.024	0.002	0.022
Belarus	0.127	0.949	0.079	0.989	0.068	1.12
Belgium	0.550	2.394	0.398	2.618	0.435	2.417
Belize	0.002	0.012	0.007	0.011	0.006	0.009
Benin		0.102		0.111	0	0.071
Bermuda		0.008	0	0.011	0	0.01
Bhutan	0.034	0.048	0.066	0.021	0.069	0.015
Bolivia	0.613	0.296	0.813	0.305	0.907	0.275
Bosnia and Herzegovina	0.209	0.3	0.163	0.214	0.111	0.206
Botswana	0.064	0.103	0.056	0.079	0.038	0.066
Brazil	10.824	10.766	9.689	9.992	8.496	10.493
British Virgin Islands		0.003		0.003	0	0.003
Brunei	0.587	0.209	0.699	0.182	0.671	0.151
Bulgaria	0.473	0.737	0.429	0.714	0.416	0.705
Burkina Faso	0.001	0.078	0.002	0.065	0	0.041
Burma	0.699	0.501	0.718	0.518	0.653	0.36
Burundi	0.001	0.012	0.001	0.011	0.003	0.006
Cambodia	0.017	0.215	0.017	0.174	0.006	0.094
Cameroon	0.246	0.13	0.226	0.122	0.196	0.122
Canada	21.550	12.266	21.229	12.792	18.299	12.352
Cape Verde		0.01	0.001	0.014	0	0.013
Cayman Islands		0.01		0.009	0	0.008
Central African Republic	0.001	0.005	0.001	0.004	0.001	0.003
Chad	0.250	0.029	0.301	0.024	0.238	0.014
Chile	0.261	1.338	0.263	1.377	0.238	1.197
China	137.828	173.964	108.192	137.267	107.417	130.043
Colombia	3.733	1.338	4.773	1.333	5.063	1.384
Comoros	0	0.005		0.004	0	0.002
Congo, Democratic Republic of the	0.083	0.096	0.092	0.077	0.074	0.11
Congo, Republic of the	0.606	0.043	0.792	0.061	0.564	0.094
Cook Islands		0.001		0.002	0	0.001
Costa Rica	0.044	0.163	0.040	0.159	0.034	0.139
Cote d'Ivoire	0.171	0.218	0.166	0.178	0.158	0.162
Croatia	0.088	0.302	0.109	0.316	0.116	0.288
Cuba	0.103	0.362	0.148	0.378	0.174	0.434
Cyprus	0.003	0.098	0.004	0.115	0.002	0.101
Czech Republic	0.883	1.618	1.010	1.736	1.122	1.688
Denmark	0.358	0.592	0.511	0.647	0.619	0.651
Djibouti		0.011		0.011	0	0.014
Dominica		0.003		0.003	0	0.002
Dominican Republic	0.011	0.412	0.025	0.373	0.007	0.291
Ecuador	1.165	0.542	1.346	0.612	1.286	0.638
Egypt	3.890	4.047	3.825	3.995	2.367	3.634
El Salvador	0.025	0.15	0.019	0.15	0.016	0.108
Equatorial Guinea	0.650	0.069	0.573	0.093	0.788	0.104
Eritrea		0.009		0.01	0	0.008
Estonia	0.013	0.098	0.009	0.091	0.01	0.083
Ethiopia	0.053	0.289	0.050	0.237	0.033	0.18
Falkland Islands		0.001		0.001	0	0.001
Faroe Islands	0.001	0.012	0.002	0.012	0.001	0.011
Fiji	0.002	0.02	0.002	0.025	0.002	0.022
Finland	0.479	1.008	0.422	1.111	0.41	1.111
France	3.443	8.29	4.676	9.729	4.828	9.836
French Guiana			0.005	0.017	0.004	0.016
French Polynesia	0.001	0.014	0.002	0.015	0.002	0.016
Gabon	0.441	0.057	0.444	0.061	0.496	0.068
Gambia, The		0.007		0.008	0	0.007
Georgia	0.043	0.217	0.037	0.193	0.036	0.169
Germany	3.013	11.093	3.816	12.839	4.219	12.792
Ghana	0.501	0.382	0.434	0.293	0.258	0.207
Gibraltar	0	0.192	0	0.185	0	0.164
Greece	0.154	0.983	0.251	1.077	0.319	1.052
Greenland	0.001	0.009	0.001	0.01	0	0.009
Grenada		0.005		0.004	0	0.004
Guadeloupe			0.002	0.029	0	0.036
Guam		0.025	0.001	0.026	0	0.028
Guatemala	0.062	0.3	0.070	0.301	0.060	0.213
Guinea	0.007	0.068	0.007	0.044	0.005	0.036
Guinea-Bissau		0.005		0.005	0	0.005
Guyana		0.035		0.032	0	0.028
Haiti	0.001	0.039	0.001	0.049	0	0.04
Honduras	0.033	0.171	0.028	0.164	0.014	0.133
Hong Kong	0.002	1.257	0.001	1.343	0	1.17
Hungary	0.339	0.996	0.359	1.05	0.336	0.932
Iceland	0.068	0.115	0.067	0.12	0.061	0.097
India	21.89	35.257	16.510	30.626	14.103	25.624
Indonesia	16.502	9.102	15.766	7.39	14.949	6.524
Iran	17.636	13.502	18.062	11.791	13.894	10.331
Iraq	10.022	2.567	10.314	2.559	7.235	1.634
Ireland	0.110	0.605	0.165	0.609	0.032	0.537
Israel	0.867	1.025	0.381	1.039	0.297	0.967
Italy	0.785	5.806	0.942	6.284	1.063	6.08
Jamaica	0.002	0.132	0.002	0.121	0.002	0.119
Japan	1.735	16.89	1.502	18.577	0.788	19.171
Jordan	0.011	0.349	0.023	0.389	0.007	0.344
Kazakhstan	7.715	3.416	8.063	3.337	7.512	3.255
Kenya	0.04	0.308	0.037	0.299	0.028	0.231
Kiribati		0.001		0.001	0	0
Korea, North	0.639	0.675	0.668	0.708	0.825	0.468
Korea, South	1.864	12.204	1.438	12.33	1.587	11.541
Kuwait	7.126	1.716	6.909	1.687	6.447	1.577
Kyrgyzstan	0.105	0.179	0.168	0.174	0.147	0.169
Laos	0.302	0.22	0.305	0.243	0.072	0.068
Latvia	0.013	0.122	0.035	0.138	0.027	0.137
Lebanon	0.003	0.37	0.002	0.356	0.001	0.313
Lesotho	0.002	0.014	0.005	0.013	0.005	0.012
Liberia	0.002	0.01		0.019	0	0.017
Libya	2.699	0.801	2.82	0.911	1.652	0.773
Lithuania	0.020	0.244	0.019	0.271	0.017	0.251
Luxembourg	0.006	0.153	0.004	0.188	0.005	0.177
Macau	0.002	0.048	0	0.051	0	0.041
Madagascar	0.003	0.056	0.004	0.048	0.003	0.047
Malawi	0.006	0.027	0.007	0.026	0.003	0.022
Malaysia	4.185	3.954	4.221	3.686	3.87	3.35
Maldives		0.029		0.028	0	0.03
Mali	0.005	0.101	0.005	0.077	0.005	0.044
Malta	0.001	0.12	0.002	0.131	0	0.091
Martinique			0.001	0.032	0	0.039
Mauritania	0.002	0.063	0.004	0.057	0.014	0.038
Mauritius	0.004	0.071	0.006	0.094	0.006	0.077
Mexico	5.921	7.563	5.994	7.544	8.083	7.369
Micronesia	0	0.002	0	0.003		
Moldova	0.002	0.127	0.003	0.139	0.003	0.143
Mongolia	0.773	0.194	1.215	0.240	0.74	0.194
Montenegro	0.022	0.037	0.022	0.038	0.021	0.034
Montserrat			0		0	0.001
Morocco	0.029	0.934	0.027	0.826	0.037	0.779
Mozambique	0.504	0.179	0.69	0.161	0.595	0.168
Namibia	0.004	0.063	0.005	0.071	0.014	0.065
Nauru	0	0.001	0	0.001	0	0
Nepal	0.034	0.18	0.017	0.142	0.036	0.08
Netherlands	0.968	3.313	1.47	3.736	2.465	3.724
Netherlands Antilles	0.001	0.179	0.003	0.196	0	0.186
New Caledonia	0.002	0.06	0.003	0.076	0.005	0.063
New Zealand	0.361	0.616	0.406	0.708	0.698	0.694
Nicaragua	0.015	0.09	0.013	0.084	0.024	0.077
Niger	0.025	0.037	0.032	0.035	0.046	0.033
Nigeria	4.452	1.872	5.966	1.689	6.873	1.686
Niue	0		0		0	0
North Macedonia	0.032	0.097	0.037	0.098	0.052	0.111
Norway	8.907	1.099	8.66	1.188	8.29	1.912
Oman	3.753	1.411	3.393	1.347	3.14	1.141
Pakistan	1.978	3.514	1.678	3.117	1.646	2.621
Palestine	0.001	0.08		0.067	0	0.056
Panama	0.036	0.384	0.079	0.398	0.019	0.32
Papua New Guinea	0.475	0.067	0.45	0.093	0.282	0.073
Paraguay	0.219	0.193	0.161	0.177	0.196	0.124
Peru	0.877	0.849	0.931	0.949	0.972	0.87
Philippines	0.469	1.798	0.521	1.811	0.425	1.257
Poland	2.05	4.055	2.349	4.287	2.608	3.958
Portugal	0.124	0.833	0.282	0.917	0.14	0.87
Puerto Rico	0.002	0.248	0.011	0.291	0.002	0.318
Qatar	9.958	2.201	9.737	2.233	9.746	2.13
Réunion	0		0.009	0.048	0.006	0.006
Romania	0.803	1.154	0.93	1.269	0.977	1.212
Russia	59.936	32.541	63.463	31.298	55.333	30.287
Rwanda	0.004	0.023	0.004	0.019	0.002	0.014
Saint Helena	0		0		0	0
Saint Kitts and Nevis		0.004		0.004	0	0.014
Saint Lucia		0.009		0.006	0	0.006
Saint Pierre and Miquelon	0	0.001	0	0.001	0	0.001
Saint Vincent and the Grenadines		0.004		0.004	0	0.003
Samoa		0.005		0.005	0.001	0.002
Sao Tome and Principe		0.002		0.002	0	0.002
Saudi Arabia	29.651	11.429	29.181	11.657	27.588	11.191
Senegal	0.009	0.136	0.005	0.132	0.005	0.107
Serbia	0.32	0.593	0.385	0.611	0.358	0.512
Seychelles		0.012		0.016	0	0.015
Sierra Leone	0.001	0.019	0.001	0.014	0.002	0.002
Singapore	0.071	3.713	0.054	3.742	0.049	3.228
Slovakia	0.238	0.514	0.219	0.705	0.235	0.66
Slovenia	0.094	0.243	0.113	0.266	0.119	0.247
Solomon Islands		0.004		0.005	0	0.005
Somalia		0.012		0.012	0	0.012
South Africa	6.03	5.721	5.773	5.455	5.938	5.584
Spain	1.081	5.048	1.037	5.317	1.092	4.975
Sri Lanka	0.022	0.315	0.025	0.331	0.017	0.279
Sudan	0.159	0.294	0.159	0.315	0.243	0.248
Sudan, South	0.288	0.029	0.289	0.024		
Suriname	0.036	0.034	0.041	0.035	0.037	0.034
Swaziland		0.021	0.008	0.022	0.008	0.019
Sweden	1.017	1.581	1.07	1.704	1.003	1.668
Switzerland	0.328	0.899	0.396	0.976	0.423	0.988
Syria	0.325	0.401	0.206	0.473	0.256	0.454
Taiwan	0.339	4.92	0.35	4.684	0.488	4.672
Tajikistan	0.116	0.162	0.107	0.139	0.975	0.119
Tanzania	0.14	0.211	0.075	0.179	0.039	0.158
Thailand	2.156	5.016	2.684	5.439	2.661	5.074
Timor-Leste	0.128	0.009	0.247	0.007	0.322	0.007
Togo	0.001	0.036		0.034	0.001	0.03
Tonga		0.002	0	0.002	0	0.003
Trinidad and Tobago	1.141	0.651	1.474	0.736	1.784	1.011
Tunisia	0.126	0.416	0.133	0.412	0.178	0.357
Turkey	1.281	6.025	1.219	5.846	0.882	4.911
Turkmenistan	3.678	1.818	3.563	1.74	3.373	1.44
Turks and Caicos Islands		0.004	0	0.003	0	0.003
Uganda	0.02	0.106	0.038	0.097	0.019	0.077
Ukraine	1.405	2.194	2.372	3.681	2.859	4.352
United Arab Emirates	10.883	4.686	9.555	4.101	9.228	4.152
United Kingdom	4.267	6.735	5.09	7.808	4.444	8.018
United States	98.526	94.791	91.963	97.405	84.792	95.335
Uruguay	0.065	0.162	0.065	0.163	0.056	0.231
Uzbekistan	1.865	1.854	2.272	1.828	2.359	1.983
Vanuatu		0.004		0.003	0	0.002
Venezuela	2.5	1.621	4.51	2.255	6.961	3.294
Vietnam	2.34	3.841	2.312	3.186	2.303	2.258
U.S. Virgin Islands		0.032		0.034	0	0.224
Wake Island	0	0.017	0	0.02	0	0.019
Western Sahara	0	0.004	0	0.004	0	0.004
Yemen	0.111	0.133	0.104	0.124	0.617	0.302
Zambia	0.08	0.142	0.153	0.135	0.052	0.172
Zimbabwe	0.107	0.191	0.103	0.148	0.162	0.159

== See also ==
- List of countries by energy consumption per capita
- Electric energy consumption
- List of countries by electricity consumption
- Electricity by country
- List of countries by electricity production
- List of countries by renewable electricity production
