= Energy in Burkina Faso =

Energy in Burkina Faso is sourced primarily from diesel and heavy fuel, with some access to hydropower and solar.

Burkina Faso produced 69 kilotonnes of oil equivalent (ktoe) of energy in 2015, 89.8% of which was generated from fossil fuels. Final consumption of electricity was 86 ktoe. The country uses energy from biomass, fossil fuels, hydroelectricity, and solar.

As of 2014, Burkina Faso's total greenhouse gas emissions were at 32.60 million metric tons of carbon dioxide equivalent (MtCO_{2}e). The country has committed to reducing its emissions by at least 7.8 MtCO_{2}e (or 6.6%) by 2030. The country targets 100% of its electricity generation to come from renewable sources by 2050.

== Electricity ==
As of 2008, it is estimated 19% of Burkina Faso has access to electricity. In 2017, French president Emmanuel Macron inaugurated a 33 MW solar plant that produces electricity for 110,000 households. West Africa's biggest solar plant began operation in Burkina Faso on November 29, 2017.

Energy production by type (2019)
Type	installed power (MW)
Diesel and heavy fuel oil	253
Hydropower	32
Solar	33
Total	318

== Clean fuels for cooking ==
As of 2020, it is estimated 10.60% of Burkina Faso have access to access to clean fuels for cooking, according to our world in data.
