= Renewable energy in Palestine =

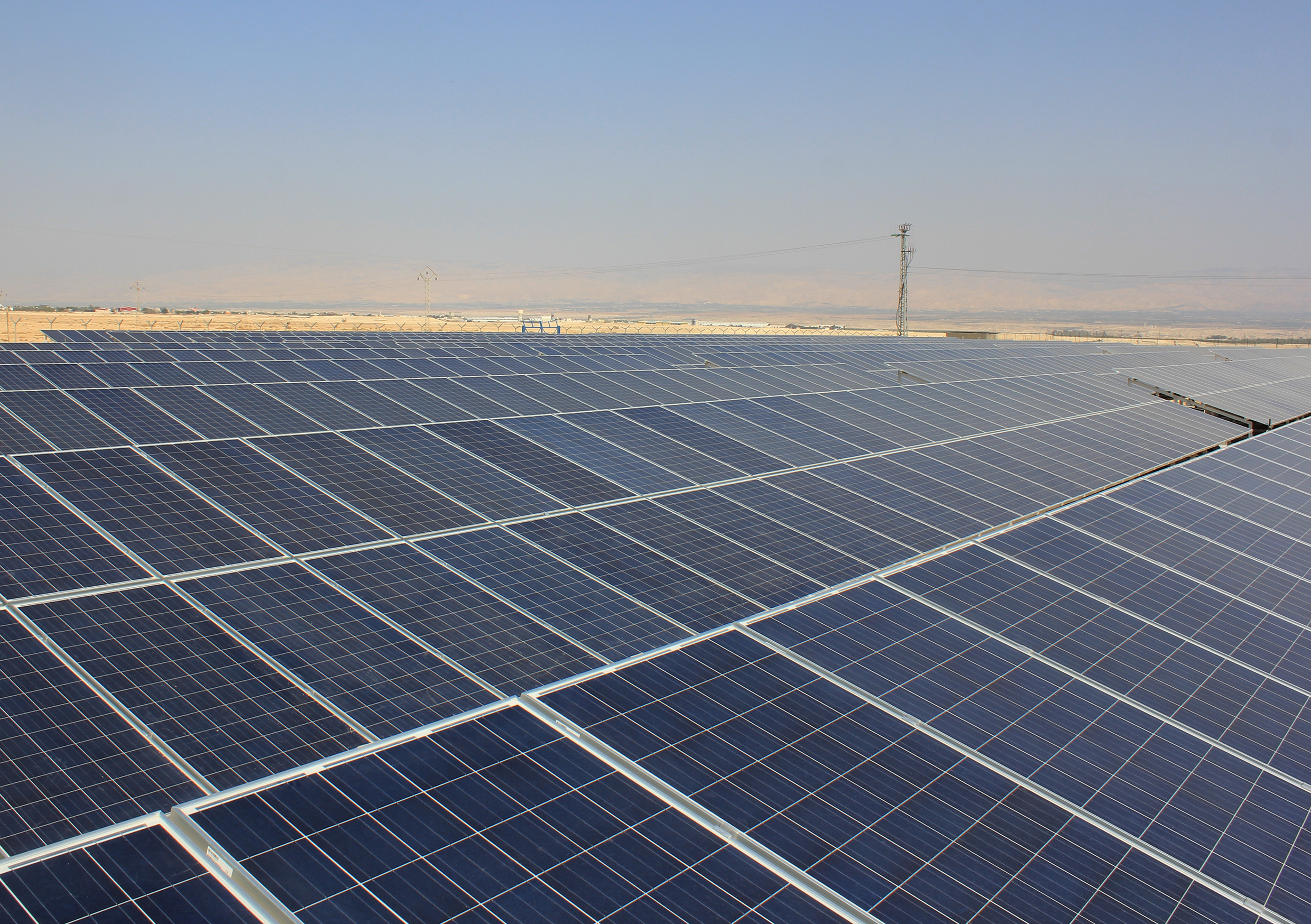
Dead Sea Photovoltaic Power Generating Plant in Jericho

Renewable energy in Palestine is a small component of the national energy mix, accounting for 1.4% of energy produced in 2012. Palestine has some of the highest rate of solar water heating in the region, and there are a number of solar power projects. A number of issues confront renewable energy development; a lack of national infrastructure and the limited regulatory framework of the Oslo Accords are both barriers to investment.

The country is currently experiencing energy shortages, and there are frequent power cuts, which range from 12 to 16 hours long. The energy deficit for an average citizen was estimated at 415MWh, a shortfall due to energy insecurity. The population of Palestine ballooned to almost five million by 2015, putting a strain on existing energy sources, such as diesel, kerosene, and oil, and the construction of new energy infrastructure is rare.

Due to having an estimated 3,400 hours of sunshine a year, the most promising renewable energy source for Palestine is solar power, and it is estimated that it has the highest density of rooftop solar-powered systems in the world. This is in spite of the fact that the government of Israel has sometimes restricted the entry of materials used to make solar panels into Gaza in the 21st century. There are also higher-elevation areas, such as Ramallah, East Jerusalem, and Hebron which are well-suited to the implementation of wind power. A 2012 study estimated that solar power could make up 13% of Palestine's potential energy usage, wind could make up 6.6%, and biofuel 5%.

== Energy in Palestine ==
Palestine produces no oil or natural gas and is predominantly dependent on the Israel Electric Corporation (IEC) for electricity. According to UNCTAD, the Palestinian Territory "lies above sizeable reservoirs of oil and natural gas wealth" but "occupation continues to prevent Palestinians from developing their energy fields so as to exploit and benefit from such assets." In 2012, electricity available in West Bank and Gaza was 5,370 GW-hour (3,700 in the West Bank and 1,670 in Gaza), while the annual per capita consumption of electricity (after deducting transmission loss) was 950 kWh. National sources only produce 445 GWh of electricity, supplying less than 10% of demand. The only domestic source of energy is the disputed Gaza Marine gas field, which has not yet been developed. Palestinian energy demand increased rapidly, increasing by 6.4% annually between 1999 and 2005. Future consumption of electricity is expected to reach 8,400 GWh by 2020 on the expectation that consumption will increase by 6% annually.

The Palestinian Electricity Transmission Company (PETL), formed in 2013, is currently the sole buyer of electricity in the areas under Palestinian Authority (PA) control. It buys electricity from the Palestine Power Generation Company (PPGC), IEC, and other neighboring countries, which is then distributed to the six Palestinian district electricity distribution companies.

Structurally, Palestine does not have sufficient distribution companies or systems. This problem leads to constraints on electricity efficiency. The West Bank and the Gaza Strip receive and consume energy in different ways.

=== National policy ===
The Palestinian Energy Authority (PEA) published a 'General Renewable Energy Strategy' in 2012, aiming for 10% of total domestic energy production and 5% of total energy consumption to come from renewable sources by 2020.

== Sources ==
=== Solar power ===
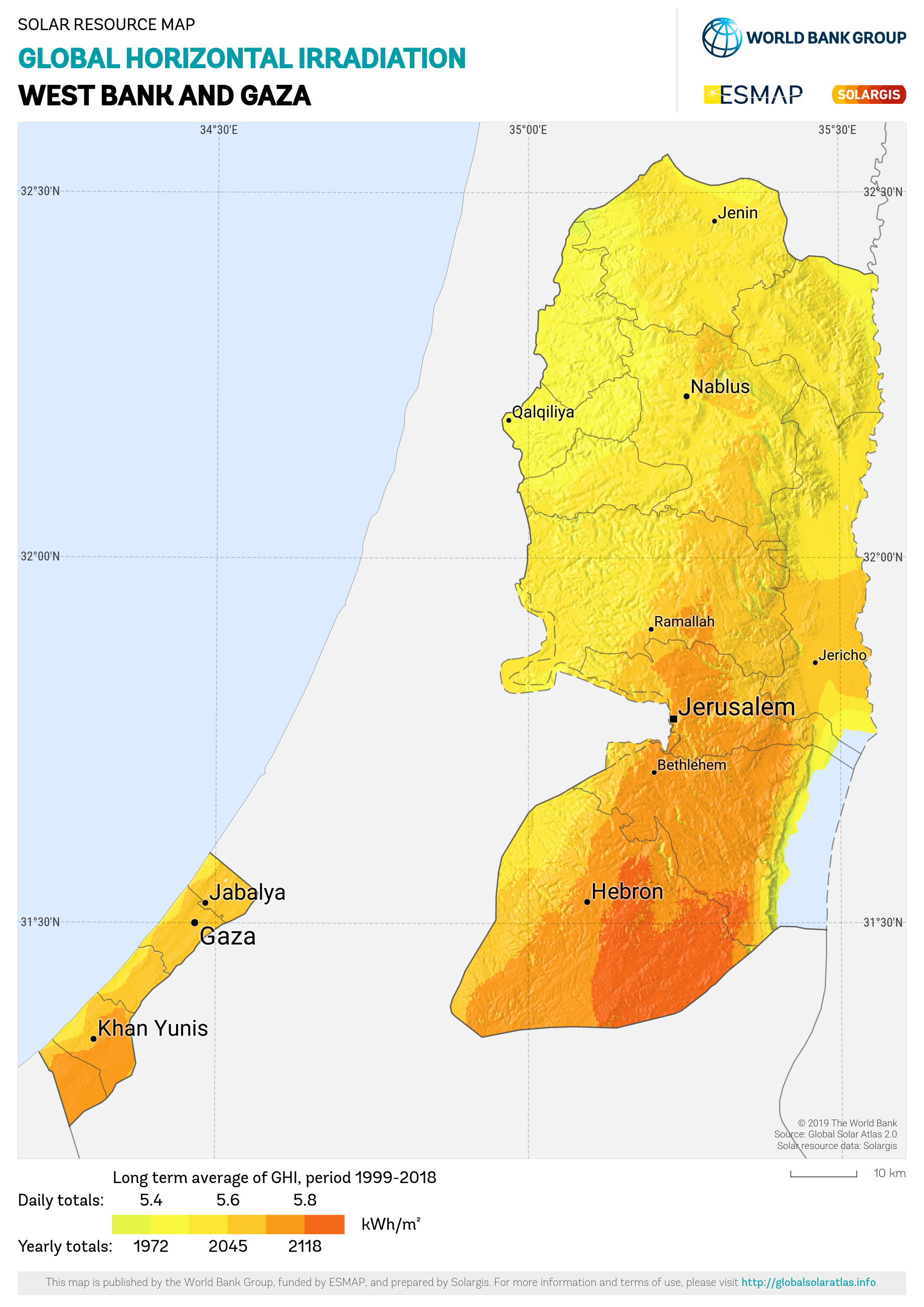
Solar potential of Palestine

Solar power is often touted as the most promising renewable energy source in Palestine, due to its ample sunlight. Over half of all households in Palestine utilise solar energy heaters, although only 3% of houses depend on it as their main source. A 710kw photovoltaic plant was commissioned in September, 2014 in the vicinity of Jericho; it is the largest plant in Palestine to date. Research has indicated that, although a very high percentage of Palestinian houses are connected to the central grid, powering remote villages with small-scale photovoltaic systems would be more economically feasible than extending the grid.

Israeli authorities seized a solar/diesel hybrid electric system from the Palestinian village of Jubbet ad-Dib in July, 2017. The system was funded by the Dutch government and installed by joint Israeli-Palestinian organisation Comet-ME, leading the Dutch Foreign Ministry to lodge a complaint. The Coordinator of Government Activities in the Territories told reporters that the solar panels were erected "without the necessary permits, and that stop work orders had previously been sent to the village authorities," although a Haaretz report indicated that the confiscation orders were only delivered during the raid, meaning there was no chance to contest them in court. Residents of the village, located in Area C between a number of Israeli settlements, had been attempting to implement and gain approval for solar power projects since 2009.

It has been estimated by the World Bank that 98% of the available renewable energy potential is solar. Under the Massader plan, 500 schools were planned to be fitted with solar panels, funded by a loan from the European Investment Bank. However, due to the fact that Palestine receives an estimated 3,400 hours of sunlight per year, and average daily solar radiation ranging from 6.15 to 8.27 kWh/m^{2}, solar energy is seriously underutilised. The southern parts of the West Bank have been identified as the places with the best solar potential. Despite this, solar power remains unviable due for many residents, due to being unaffordable, with systems built through donations operating at such low capacities as to only cover lighting.

=== Wind power ===
It has been estimated that wind energy has the potential to account for 2-6.6% of energy usage in the Palestinian Territories. The potential for wind energy varies by region, and though the average is 300 W/m^{2}, in the mountains it gets as high as 600 W/m^{2}, and in low-lying areas as low as 100W/m^{2}. In these areas of high elevation, including Ramallah and East Jerusalem, wind energy may be produced at 0.07 $/kWh. An example of application of wind energy in Palestine is Al Hilal hospital, in Hebron, which is 1,000m above sea level.

=== Biomass ===
In 2018, Palestinians in the West Bank and Gaza combined produced over 1.59 million tons, or roughly 4,356 tons/day, of municipal solid waste with an average output per person of 0.9 kg/day.

There are issues with the use of biomass power, however. About half of the Palestinian population - mainly in the rural areas, refugee camps, and Bedouins of North and South Governorates - are exposed daily to harmful emissions and other health risks from biomass burning that typically takes place in traditional stoves without adequate ventilation. The majority of individuals exposed to enhanced concentrations of pollutants are women and young children.

== Barriers ==
There are a number of barriers to development of renewable energy resources in Palestine, including regulatory issues resulting from the Israeli occupation, and this meant the government was unable to achieve its target of 25 megawatts by 2015. However, renewable energy has a large potential to reduce reliance on imported energy and address a number of social issues. The West Bank is especially dependent on Israel for energy, with 97.5% of electricity coming from the Israel Electric Corporation. The monopoly of IEC has led to difficulties improving renewable energy infrastructure in Palestine. Awareness of renewable energy is low in many areas of the Palestinian Territories, which has been a significant barrier. In one university, it was found that students and faculty had low awareness of how much the Palestinian Authority and PENRA (Palestinian Energy and Natural Resources Authority) were making use of solar power, and believed it to be more successful than it was.
