= Energy in Angola =

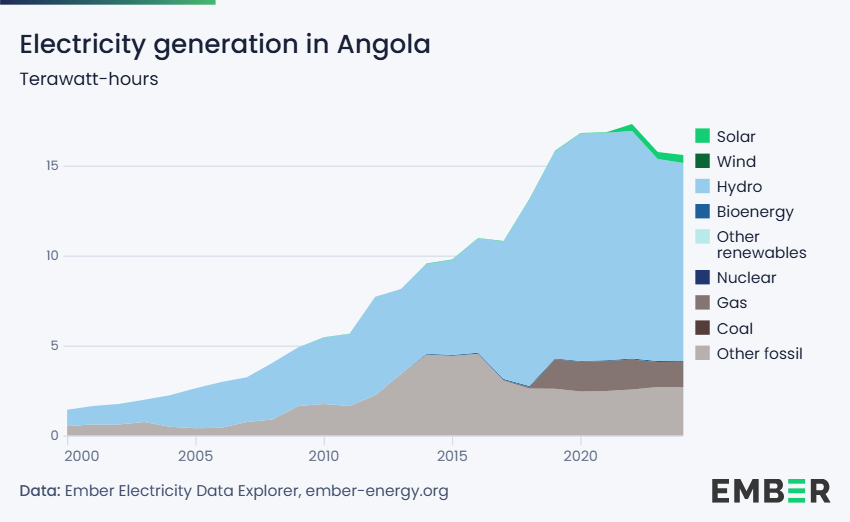
Electricity generation in Angola in terawatt-hours

Energy in Angola describes energy and electricity production, consumption and export from Angola. The energy policy of Angola reflects energy policy and the politics of Angola.

Biomass accounts for 58% of the country's energy consumption; oil accounts for 35%, gas 4% and hydroelectric power 3%.

Primary energy use in 2009 in Angola was 138 TWh and 7 TWh per million persons.

Angolans used to suffer frequent daily blackouts. In 2012, days before the election, the government announced $17B US in planned energy investment, designed to alleviate the paucity of available energy.

The International Renewable Energy Agency (IRENA) reports that Angola's renewable energy usage increased from 50% of the total energy supply in 2015 to 63% in 2020. Within this sector, bioenergy represents 85% of Angola's renewable energy supply as of 2020. This shift in Angola's energy strategy indicates a move towards sustainable resources, reducing the country's previous dependence on conventional fuels like oil and gas.

== Overview ==
Energy in Angola
	Capita	Prim. energy	Production	Net export	Electricity	CO_{2}-emission
	Million	TWh	TWh	TWh	TWh	Mt
2004	15.49	110	667	547	1.92	17.69
2007	17.02	124	1,104	979	3.24	10.66
2008	18.02	128	1,231	1,090	3.41	19.12
2009	18.50	138	1,174	1,033	3.75	12.92
2012	19.62	139	1,013	864	5.01	24.72
2015	28.12	152	1,037	873	9.30	33.09
2020	33.43	160	745	573	14.90	20.54
2022	35.59	164	677	501	16.10	26.68
2024	37.90	163	669	494	16.70	28.10
Change 2004-2024	+144.7%	+48.0%	+0.3%	-9.7%	+769.8%	+58.8%
Mtoe = 11.63 TWh, Prim. energy includes energy losses. Net Export calculated as Production minus Primary Energy.

Angolan population has been increased by 144.7 percent over the twenty-year period between 2004 and 2024.

== Overview of energy and macroeconomics ==
Angola's economic performance remains highly linked to its hydrocarbon sector, exposing it to cyclical global markets. Macroeconomic growth reached 5.0% in 2024 but moderated to 3.1% in 2025 due to scheduled inspections, maintenance shutdowns, and softer international oil prices. However, the non-oil domestic sector has shown resilience, expanding by 4.1% in 2025. Inflationary pressures have also eased significantly, dropping from a peak of 27.5% in late 2024 to 15.7% by December 2025, and further declining to 12.42% in early 2026. The government has prioritized fiscal consolidation, successfully reducing public debt from 59.9% of GDP in 2024 to 51.3% in 2025, while phasing out expensive fuel subsidies.

== Electricity and hydroelectricity ==
Electricity generation and transmission are managed by state utilities, including the primary public entities. Hydropower is the cornerstone of Angola's domestic grid electricity, supplying the vast majority of its generated power (Gerbens-Leenes et al., 2024). To counter historical grid constraints and vulnerabilities associated with variable renewable energy, the Angolan government has executed a $23.5 billion utility investment strategy, allocating $12 billion toward modern generation facilities, $4 billion for grid transmission infrastructure, and $7.5 billion for regional distribution systems.

== Crude oil ==
Angola is one of the top two crude oil producers in sub-Saharan Africa, competing directly with Nigeria for the continent's top spot. Together, the two nations contribute nearly 50% of Africa's total oil output. Globally, Angola ranks among the top 20 producers, sustaining an output of approximately 1.1 million barrels of oil per day.

=== Offshore production and infrastructure ===
The majority of Angola's oil production is extracted from technically complex, energy-intensive offshore deep-water and ultra-deep-water fields. These deep-water projects generally utilize newer infrastructure, such as tethered floating production storage and offloading (FPSO) vessels that aggregate production from multiple distinct fields. Conversely, older shallow-water platforms located closer to the coast utilize aging infrastructure. Airborne scientific monitoring has shown that these older, shallow-water facilities produce higher intermittent methane (CH4) emissions due to maintenance profiles and operational variances compared to the newer deep-water FPSO facilities.

=== Lobito refinery ===
Development has been planned but much delayed, of a new 200,000-barrel-per-day (32,000 m^{3}/d) refinery in the city of Lobito, on the coast. The Angolan state-owned oil company Sonangol would have a 70 percent stake in the Sonaref refinery at Lobito, its then-head Carlos Saturnino said in 2006, and the Chinese oil company Sinopec would retain the remainder.

=== Oil in the Angolan economy ===
Angola's economy was profoundly affected by the sharp drop in oil prices in 2014 and in 2020. This is even though new skyscrapers, appeared in Luanda; offices, shopping centres and apartment buildings proliferated in a "mini-golden age" as leading economist Alves da Rocha called it, from 2003-2008. Yet "probably three quarters" of the population of Luanda live in "tumbledown slums". Two thirds of the 16.5 million people in Angola live on less than $2 a day, according to the World Bank, and the oil industry employs less than one percent of the workforce.

Foreigners, including Chinese construction companies and several hundred thousand Chinese workers, and as many or more Portuguese and Brazilian trade and finance consultants and managers. Oil companies set up shop in Angola.

=== Oil spills ===
Angola fined Chevron Texaco $2m for causing environmental damage in 2002 to fisheries caused by obsolete tubes at the Cabinda oilfield. Chevron promised to spend $108 m replacing the pipes. The company pumps almost three-quarters of Angola's oil, and also reduced crude production about 12%, after a pipeline leak.

== Natural gas ==
Angola LNG made its first shipment in June 2013. A system failure brought a design flaw to light in 2014, and production resumed only in 2015. In order to maintain the supply of gas to the facility, oil majors in Angola have formed a New Gas Consortium that took a final investment decision (FID) in 2022 on developing the Quiluma and Maboqueiro non-associated gas fields.

== See also ==
- Oil megaprojects (2011)
- Renewable energy by country
