= Energy in Zambia =

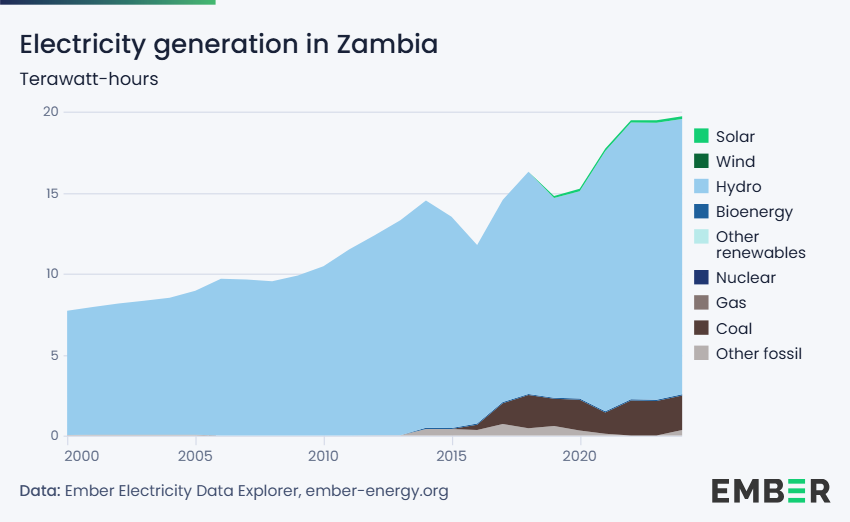
Electricity generation in Zambia in terawatt-hours

Zambia is potentially self-sufficient in sources of electricity, coal, biomass and renewable energy. The only energy source where the country is not self-sufficient is petroleum energy. Many of the sources of energy where the country is self-sufficient are largely unexploited. As of 2017, the country's electricity generating capacity stood at 1,901 megawatts.

== Overview ==
As of 2016, it was estimated that 28 percent of Zambia's population had access to electricity, with 62 percent of the urban population and 5 percent of the rural population having access. At that time, about 500,000 urban households and approximately 1.8 million rural households did not have access to electricity. It is estimated that electricity demand in the country is growing at about 3 percent annually.

There are three power producing and distribution companies in Zambia; (a) Zambia Electricity Supply Corporation Limited (ZESCO), a government-owned company (b) Lunsemfwa Hydro Power Limited and (c) Ndola Energy. ZESCO, the largest of the three owns and maintains 94.7 percent (2306/2434) of installed hydropower capacity, as of 2016.

== Hydroelectricity ==
As of 2022, the country had 3,456 megawatts (4,635,000 hp) of installed hydropower capacity against a peak national demand of 2,300 megawatts (3,100,000 hp), resulting in a surplus of 1000MW which is exported to the Central and Southern African region. Zambia has an estimated 6,000 megawatts (8,000,000 hp) of untapped hydropower potential. Hydroelectricity constitutes 90 percent of Zambia's electricity generation pool. Several existing large hydro facilities are currently being upgraded. Some of the new large hydropower projects in the pipeline include the 2,400 megawatts Batoka Gorge Hydroelectric Power Station and the 1,000 megawatts Luapula Hydroelectric Power Station. Substantial untapped hydropower potential exists for small scale rural electrification projects.

== Thermal power ==
There are three grid-ready thermal power stations. The 50 megawatts (67,000 hp) heavy fuel oil plant owned by Ndola Energy, the six gas turbines with combined capacity of 80 megawatts (110,000 hp) owned by the Copperbelt Energy Corporation and the Maamba Coal power plant with a capacity of 300 megawatts (400,000 hp).

Zambia has proven coal reserves of at least 80,000,000 tonnes in the country's Southern Province. Potential reserves exist elsewhere in the county, although the size of that potential has not yet been quantified.

== Oil and natural gas ==
Although Zambia has no proven commercial deposits of oil, the country hosts an oil refinery, the Indeni Petroleum Refinery, a 24,000 barrels-a-day facility, based in Ndola, in the Copperbelt Province.

== Renewable energy ==
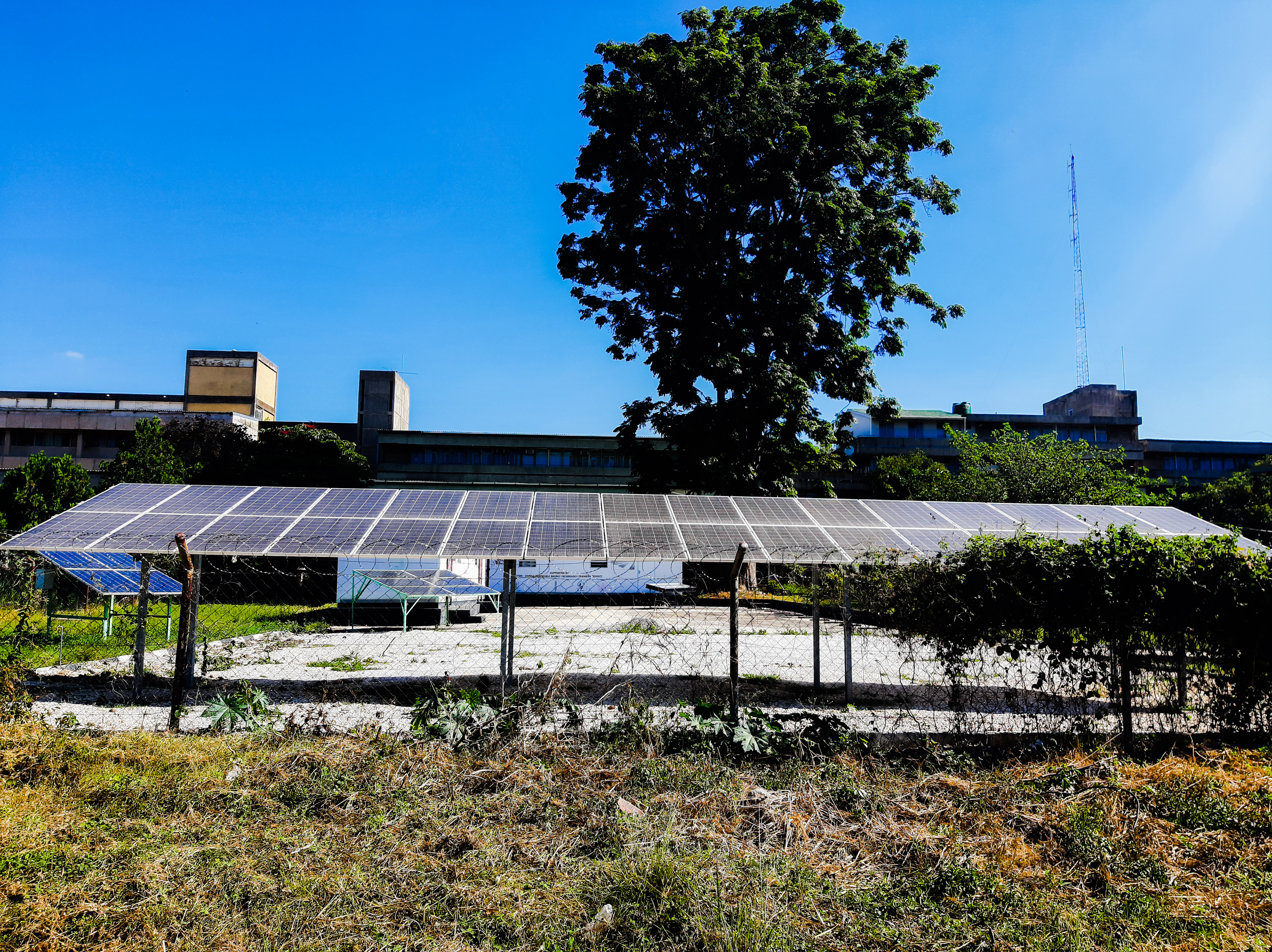

Zambia has a diversity of potential sources of renewable energy, such as its abundant water resources for hydropower generation. Renewable energy development in the country is supported by a renewable energy strategy and a national climate change response strategy that promote low emissions, as well as the implementation of sustainable land management practices.

Hydropower accounts for 85 percent of the country's total installed capacity, while there is a potential to increase production from wind and photovoltaic energy systems.

As of April 2016, the peak electricity demand outstripped peak energy production by 560 megawatts. The government, ZESCO, civil society and other stakeholders are exploring opportunities in the solar, wind, and geothermal spaces to meet the deficit and to plan for future energy needs. A 54MW solar plant opened in 2019 two years after signing the contract, at a non-indexed cost of US$0.06/kWh for 25 years.

As the percentage of people with access to electricity remains small, the use of solar energy has become increasingly common.

Zambia has significant potential for floating solar on its reservoirs, primarily Lake Kariba.

== See also ==
- List of power stations in Zambia
- Economy of Zambia
