= Energy in Botswana =

Energy in Botswana is dominated by coal-fired electricity generation. No proven oil reserves have been identified, and all petroleum products are imported in refined form, mostly from South Africa. Botswana also has woody biomass resources, estimated at 3 to 10 t/ha.

The country has developed a strategy to attract investment in renewable energy, including wind, solar and biomass energy. Botswana's power stations include Morupule Power Stations B (600 MW) and A (132 MW), Orapa Power Station (90 MW) and Phakalane Power Station (1.3 MW).

The International Renewable Energy Agency (IRENA) undertook an evaluation of the national energy sector in 2021 and found that Botswana could meet 15% of its energy needs in 2030 from its indigenous solar, wind, and bioenergy resources.

== Renewable Energy ==
Solar insolation is one of the highest levels in the world, but until recently there were no reports of significant use of solar energy. As of September 2012, the first solar power generation plant in the country has been opened.

The Botswana Renewable Energy Conference was held 11–12 August 2014. The Sustainable Development Goals were cited for development of renewable energy through "green and environmentally sound technologies" at the 5th plenary meeting, 70th Session of the United Nations General Assembly: the Sustainable Development Summit 2015.

== See also ==
- Post-2015 Development Agenda
- Sustainable Development Goals
- Tragedy of the Commons
