= Energy in Cameroon =

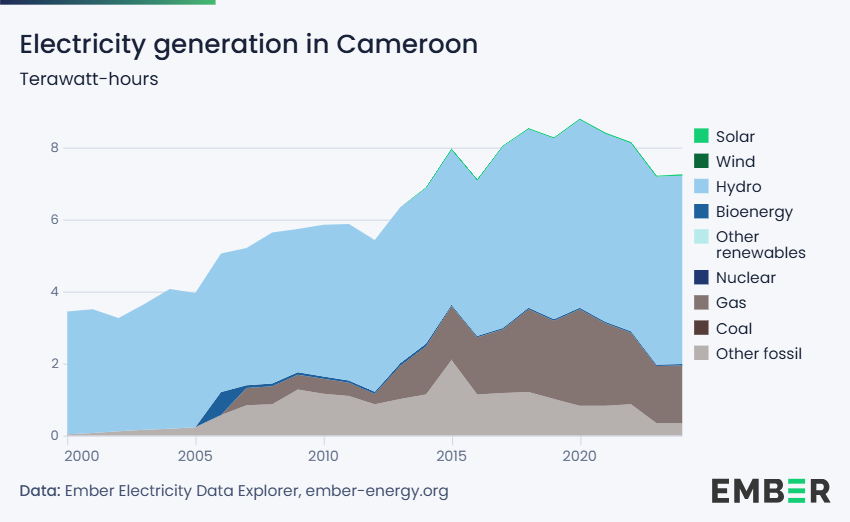
Electricity generation in Cameroon in terawatt-hours

Energy in Cameroon is a growing industry with tremendous potential, especially with the hydroelectric industry. With a total installed capacity of 1,292 MW, the mix of energy production of Cameroon consists of 57% of hydraulic power source, 21% of thermal springs in the gas, 10% of heat source to light fuel oil and 13% of heat source to heavy fuel oil.

The oil sector is managed by the national oil company Société Nationale des Hydrocarbures.

In cooperation with GDF Suez, Société Nationale des Hydrocarbures is planning to build a liquefied natural gas plant.

== See also ==
- List of power stations in Cameroon
