= Energy in Eritrea =

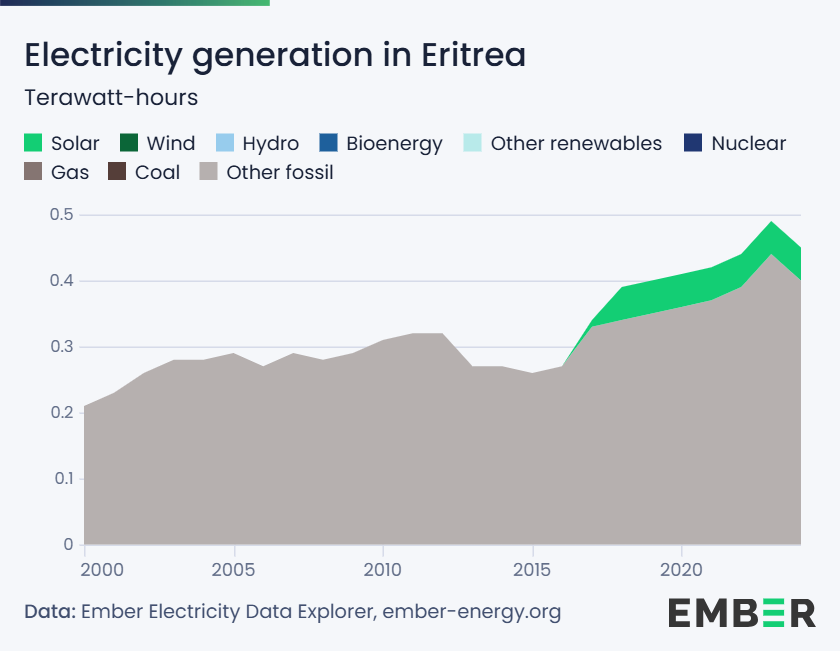
Electricity generation in Eritrea in terawatt-hours

Energy in Eritrea is an industry lacking in natural resources, though it has plenty of potential.

Eritrea's final consumption of electricity is 33 kilotonne of oil equivalent (ktoe).

== Electricity ==
In 2019, some off-the-grid community systems rely on a combination of solar power, diesel generators and grid batteries.

== Renewable energy ==
Eritrea is developing building its sustainable energy capacity from such sources as wind and solar. Development of renewable energy sources helps give the country access to reliable energy and lower greenhouse gas emissions.

The government of Eritrea built a wind energy pilot project in the city of Assab in the Southern Red Sea region in 2010 with the help of the United Nations Development Programme. The wind farm has a capacity of 750 kilowatts. It also installed six small stand-alone decentralized wind turbines in the villages of Beilul, Berasole, Dekemhare, Edi, Gahro, and Rahayta.

Eritrea has two hybrid mini-grids (solar-diesel) with a total capacity of 2.25 MW. One is in the town of Areza with a production capacity of 1.25 MW; another is in Maidma with a production capacity of 1 MW. Both use photovoltaic solar panels connected to lithium batteries.
