= Mykolaiv Port Elevator =

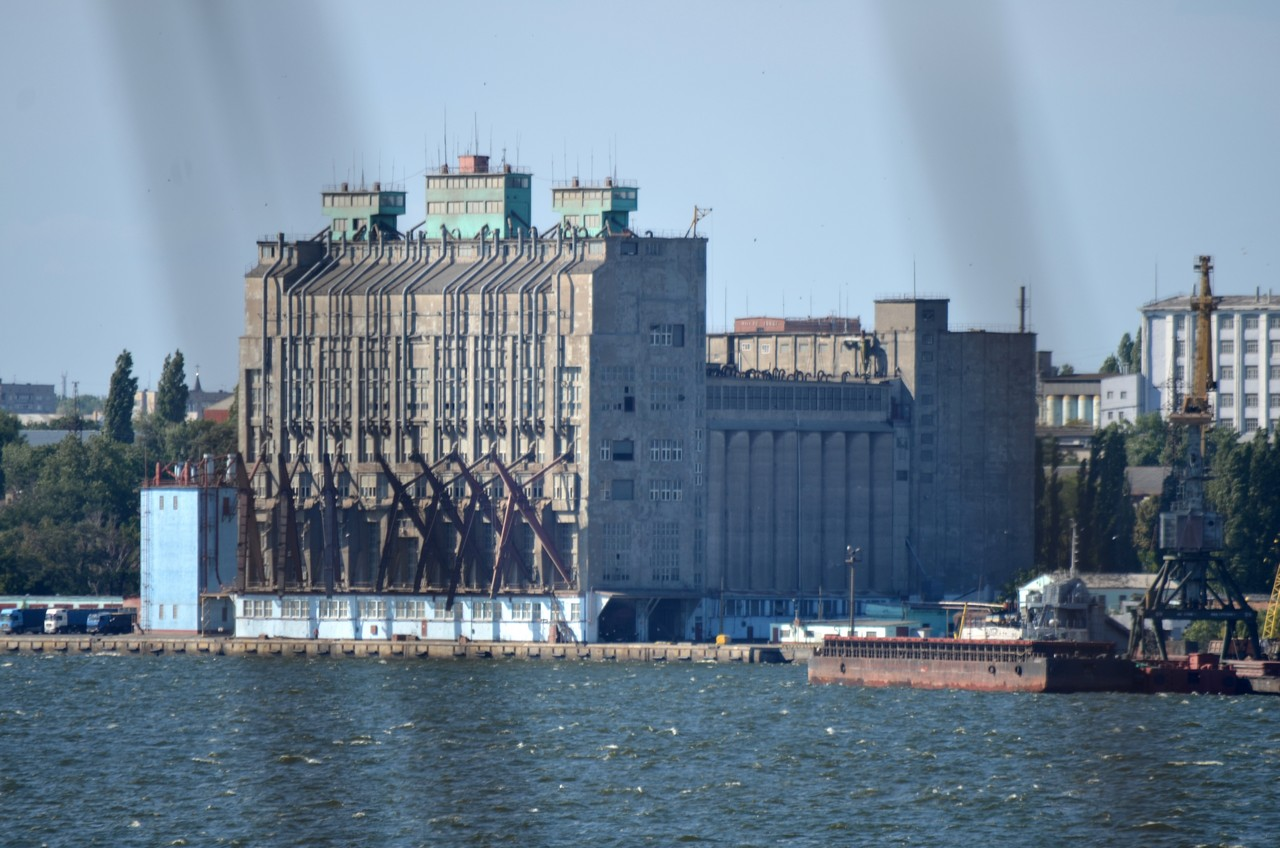
Elevator in 2013

The Mykolaiv Port Elevator is a food industry enterprise on the territory of the sea trade port in Mykolaiv. It is a subsidiary of "Bread of Ukraine" JSC.

== History ==
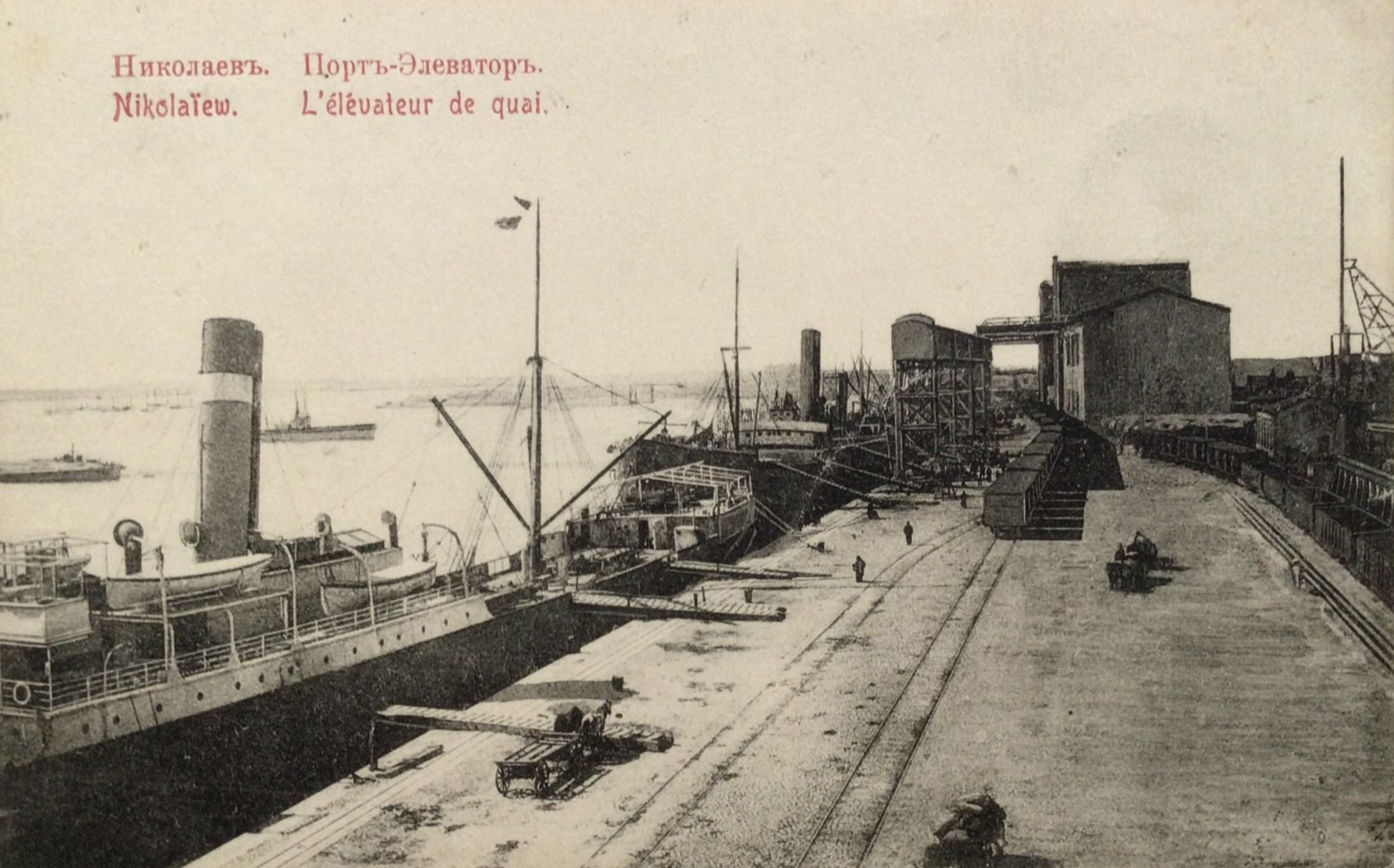
Mykolaiv seaport and the first elevator at the beginning of the 20th century

The construction of the first elevator on the territory of the Mykolaiv seaport began in February 1891 and was completed in November 1892. The total cost of the project was 831,000 rubles. On February 10, 1893, the elevator began operating. The total capacity of both elevator buildings was 1,760,000 poods of ten-pound wheat, or more than 2,800 wagons. The elevator was capable of receiving 24 wagons and giving out 36 wagons of grain in one hour and could feed the cargo simultaneously to 3 steamboats that stood near the quay. At the beginning of the 20th century, the elevator was modernized. In 1911, the mechanical transmission for the elevator equipment was replaced with an electric one, and the following year, the three pipes for releasing the grain to the steamer were replaced by a conveyor gallery, which made it possible to load the grain onto the steamer, which stood anywhere on the quay. Several branches of the railway track were built to supply wagons with bread to the elevator.

=== Mykolaiv port elevator in the early 1930s ===
The Mykolaiv port elevator was enlarged in 1930, after which it became one of the largest elevators in the country and Europe and the third largest in the world.

At the height of the Holodomor, a significant quantity of grain was brought to the Mykolaiv elevator for export. In the resolution of the office of the Mykolaiv City Party Committee dated November 20, 1933, "On Measures for Loading Export Vessels with Bread", it was stated: "To ensure uninterrupted loading of export steamships with bread, adopt a daily schedule of delivering 6,000 tons of bread to the elevator. ... Ensure that 30 wagons are loaded during the day shift for the export of bread and ... 30 wagons in the evening load". In November 1933, 6,000 tonnes of grain were loaded per day, falling in December to around 3,500 tonnes per day.

=== Characteristics ===
The height of the working tower is 63 m, the silo body consists of 144 cylindrical silos with a diameter of 4 m and seams – 22 m, as well as 119 star silos.

=== Scandals ===
In 2011, the Mykolaiv City Council registered the right of private ownership of the elevator for a joint-stock company, which later received certificates of ownership for it. In May 2018, the Supreme Court of Ukraine made a decision to return the elevator to the state.
