= List of countries by food energy intake =

Map of average daily dietary energy availability per capita in 2006–2008. No data <6,700 kJ (1,600 kcal) 6,700–7,500 kJ (1,600–1,800 kcal) 7,500–8,400 kJ (1,800–2,000 kcal) 8,400–9,200 kJ (2,000–2,200 kcal) 9,200–10,000 kJ (2,200–2,400 kcal) 10,000–11,000 kJ (2,400–2,600 kcal) 11,000–12,000 kJ (2,600–2,800 kcal) 12,000–13,000 kJ (2,800–3,000 kcal) 13,000–13,000 kJ (3,000–3,200 kcal) 13,000–14,000 kJ (3,200–3,400 kcal) 14,000–15,000 kJ (3,400–3,600 kcal) >15,000 kJ (3,600 kcal)

Daily supply of food energy per person in different countries, 1700 to 2018

Food consumption is the amount of food available for human consumption as estimated by Our World in Data. However, the actual food consumption may be lower than the quantity shown as food availability depends on the magnitude of wastage and losses of food in the household, for example during storage, in preparation and cooking, as plate-waste or quantities fed to domestic animals and pets, thrown or given away.

According to the FAO, the average minimum daily energy requirement is approximately 8,400 kilojoules (2,000 kcal) per adult and 4,200 kilojoules (1,000 kcal) a child. This data is presented in kilojoules, as most countries today use the SI unit kilojoules as their primary measurement for food energy intake, with the exception of the USA, Canada, and the UK, which use kilocalories or both.

Rank	Country	Average daily caloric food supply per capita (n.b. includes food waste)	
Rank	Country	Kilojoules (kJ)	Year
1	Ireland	16,250	2018
2	United States	15,820	2018
3	Belgium	15,770	2018
4	Turkey	15,530	2018
5	Austria	15,460	2018
6	Iceland	15,290	2018
7	Romania	14,980	2018
8	Canada	14,920	2018
9	Germany	14,870	2018
10	Poland	14,800	2018
11	Israel	14,760	2018
12	Italy	14,660	2018
13	France	14,650	2018
14	Montenegro	15,000	2018
15	Portugal	14,600	2018
16	Kuwait	14,520	2018
17	Luxembourg	14,500	2018
18	Tunisia	14,400	2018
19	South Korea	14,300	2018
20	Malta	14,300	2018
21	Morocco	14,280	2018
22	Lithuania	14,270	2018
23	Denmark	14,230	2018
24	Australia	14,190	2018
25	Greece	14,150	2018
26	Norway	14,100	2018
27	Albania	14,100	2018
28	Switzerland	14,030	2018
29	Russia	14,000	2018
30	United Kingdom	13,990	2018
31	Cuba	13,990	2018
32	Finland	13,990	2018
33	Algeria	13,900	2018
33	Spain	13,900	2018
35	Hungary	13,870	2018
36	United Arab Emirates	13,870	2018
37	Argentina	13,840	2018
38	Bosnia and Herzegovina	13,840	2018
39	Saudi Arabia	13,840	2018
40	Brazil	13,810	2018
41	Netherlands	13,790	2018
42	Egypt	13,770	2018
43	Czech Republic	13,710	2018
44	Belarus	13,700	2018
45	Hong Kong (China)	13,670	2018
46	Estonia	13,590	2018
47	Latvia	13,510	2018
48	China	13,410	2018
49	Uruguay	13,400	2018
50	New Zealand	13,350	2018
51	Slovenia	13,350	2018
52	Sweden	13,320	2018
53	Mexico	13,210	2018
54	Azerbaijan	13,180	2018
55	Colombia	13,030	2018
56	Ukraine	12,980	2018
57	Iran	12,920	2018
58	Kiribati	12,880	2018
59	Croatia	12,860	2018
60	North Macedonia	12,850	2018
61	Kazakhstan	12,830	2018
62	Mauritius	12,770	2018
63	Ghana	12,700	2018
64	Samoa	12,700	2018
65	Chile	12,670	2018
66	Costa Rica	12,670	2018
67	Vietnam	12,660	2018
68	Cyprus	12,630	2018
69	Uzbekistan	12,600	2018
70	Armenia	12,540	2018
71	Trinidad and Tobago	12,510	2018
72	Brunei	12,490	2013
73	Taiwan	12,480	2018
74	Saint Vincent and the Grenadines	12,420	2018
75	Barbados	12,370	2018
76	Dominica	12,350	2018
77	Oman	12,300	2018
78	Guyana	12,190	2018
79	South Africa	12,130	2018
80	Dominican Republic	12,100	2018
81	Indonesia	12,070	2018
82	Mauritania	12,040	2018
83	Mali	12,020	2018
84	Slovakia	12,010	2018
85	New Caledonia (France)	11,960	2017
86	Lebanon	11,950	2018
87	Bulgaria	11,940	2018
88	Panama	11,930	2018
89	Malaysia	11,900	2018
90	Georgia	11,860	2018
91	Turkmenistan	11,800	2018
92	Serbia	11,830	2018
93	Thailand	11,730	2018
94	Jamaica	11,680	2018
95	Fiji	11,640	2018
96	Ivory Coast	11,620	2018
97	Peru	11,610	2018
98	Belize	11,610	2018
99	Nepal	11,590	2018
100	Paraguay	11,580	2018
101	Laos	11,540	2018
102	Benin	11,530	2018
103	Guinea	11,490	2018
104	Burkina Faso	11,450	2018
105	Sri Lanka	11,450	2018
106	Cameroon	11,430	2018
107	Jordan	11,430	2018
108	Kyrgyzstan	11,420	2018
109	Japan	11,320	2018
110	Suriname	11,290	2018
111	El Salvador	11,280	2018
112	Djibouti	11,270	2018
113	Honduras	11,180	2018
114	Myanmar	11,180	2018
115	Philippines	11,140	2018
116	Bahamas	11,110	2018
117	Gabon	11,020	2018
118	Saint Lucia	10,950	2018
119	Iraq	10,910	2018
120	Vanuatu	10,910	2018
121	Ecuador	10,900	2018
122	Niger	10,880	2018
123	Nicaragua	10,800	2018
124	Saint Kitts and Nevis	10,800	2018
125	Mongolia	10,790	2018
126	Sudan	10,790	2018
127	Nigeria	10,760	2018
128	Bangladesh	10,720	2018
129	Guatemala	10,670	2018
130	Senegal	10,650	2018
131	Cape Verde	10,630	2018
132	India	10,600	2018
133	Gambia	10,600	2018
134	Cambodia	10,430	2018
135	Pakistan	10,400	2018
136	Namibia	10,330	2018
137	São Tomé and Príncipe	10,230	2018
138	Antigua and Barbuda	10,230	2018
139	Togo	10,220	2018
140	Eswatini	10,150	2018
141	Solomon Islands	10,100	2018
142	Bolivia	10,090	2018
143	Grenada	10,050	2018
144	Malawi	10,010	2018
145	Angola	9,980	2018
146	Moldova	9,970	2018
147	Tanzania	9,930	2018
148	Sierra Leone	9,910	2018
149	Botswana	9,800	2018
150	Ethiopia	9,780	2018
151	Lesotho	9,720	2018
152	Timor-Leste	9,570	2018
153	Republic of the Congo	9,560	2018
154	Maldives	9,350	2018
155	Guinea-Bissau	9,330	2018
156	Kenya	9,190	2018
157	Rwanda	9,150	2018
158	Liberia	9,070	2018
159	Yemen	9,010	2018
160	Venezuela	8,900	2018
161	Haiti	8,870	2018
162	Chad	8,850	2018
163	Tajikistan	8,820	2018
164	Mozambique	8,800	2018
165	Afghanistan	8,500	2018
166	North Korea	8,450	2018
167	Zambia	8,380	2018
168	Uganda	8,290	2018
169	Madagascar	8,110	2018
170	Zimbabwe	7,980	2018
171	Central African Republic	7,470	2018

== Historical development ==
Daily supply of food energy per person in world regions, 1961 to 2018

Regions of the world by food consumption per capita in kilojoules per capita per day from 1961 to 2018.

Average daily dietary energy consumption per capita in kilojoules
Region	1961	1970	1980	1990	2000	2010	2018
Africa	7,680	8,080	8,520	8,800	9,280	9,850	9,750
Asia	7,460	8,530	9,060	10,000	10,770	11,370	11,850
Europe	12,540	13,420	13,810	14,000	13,600	14,130	14,290
North America	11,230	11,750	12,500	13,240	14,070	13,900	14,520
Oceania	10,730	10,910	10,530	10,730	9,950	10,000	10,820
South America	9,740	10,310	11,150	10,870	11,700	12,500	12,900
World	9,050	9,830	10,230	10,770	11,210	11,620	11,970

== See also ==
- Food power
- Food politics
- List of countries by energy consumption per capita
