= Grain trade =

Trade in cereals and other food grains

The grain trade refers to the local and international trade in cereals such as wheat, barley, maize, rice, and other food grains. Grain is an important trade item because it is easily stored and transported with limited spoilage, unlike other agricultural products. Healthy grain supply and trade is important to many societies, providing a caloric base for most food systems as well as important role in animal feed for animal agriculture.

The grain trade began as early as agricultural settlement, identified in many of the early cultures that adopted sedentary farming. Major societal changes have been directly connected to the grain trade, such as the fall of the Roman Empire. From the early modern period onward, grain trade has been an important part of colonial expansion and foreign policy. The geopolitical dominance of countries like Australia, the United States, Canada, and the Soviet Union during the 20th century was connected with their status as grain surplus countries.

More recently, international commodity markets have been an important part of the dynamics of food systems and grain pricing. Speculation, as well as other compounding production and supply factors leading up to the 2008 financial crisis, created rapid inflation of grain prices during the 2007–2008 world food price crisis. More recently, the dominance of Ukraine and Russia in grain markets such as wheat meant that the Russian invasion of Ukraine in 2022 caused increased fears of a global food crisis in 2022. Changes to agriculture caused by climate change are expected to have cascading effects on global grain markets.

== History ==
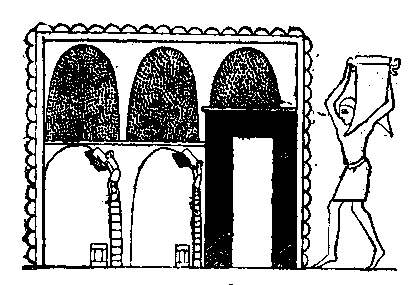
Ancient Egyptian art depicting a worker filling a grain silo

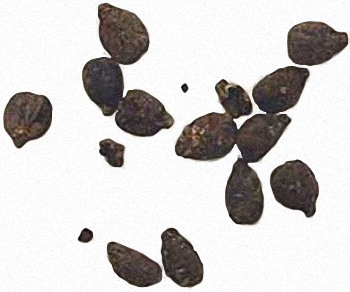
Ancient Roman grain

The grain trade is probably nearly as old as grain growing, going back to the Neolithic Revolution (around 9,500 BCE). Wherever there is a scarcity of land (e.g. cities), people must bring in food from outside to sustain themselves, either by force or by trade. However, many farmers throughout history (and today) have operated at the subsistence level, meaning they produce for household needs and have little leftover to trade. The goal for such farmers is not to specialize in one crop and grow a surplus of it, but rather to produce everything their family needs and become self-sufficient. Only in places and eras where production is geared towards producing a surplus for trade (commercial agriculture) does a major grain trade become possible.

=== Classical world ===
In the ancient world, grain regularly flowed from the hinterlands to the cores of great empires: maize in ancient Mexico, rice in ancient China, and wheat and barley in the ancient Near East. With this came improved technologies for storing and transporting grains; the Hebrew Bible makes frequent mention of ancient Egypt's massive grain silos.

Merchant shipping was important for the carriage of grain in the classical period (and continues to be so). A Roman merchant ship could carry a cargo of grain the length of the Mediterranean for the cost of moving the same amount 15 kilometres by land. The large cities of the time could not exist without the supplies delivered. For example, in the first three centuries AD, Rome consumed about 150,000 tons of Egyptian grain each year.

During the classical age, the unification of China, and the pacification of the Mediterranean basin by the Roman Empire created vast regional markets in commodities at either end of Eurasia. The grain supply to the city of Rome was considered to be of the utmost strategic importance to Roman generals and politicians.

The American Elevator and Grain Trade periodical front cover of 1904

In Europe, with the fall of the Roman Empire and the rise of feudalism, many farmers were reduced to a subsistence level, producing only enough to fulfill their obligation to their lord and the Church, with little for themselves, and even less for trading. The little that was traded was moved around locally at regular fairs.

=== Early modern and modern expansion ===
A massive expansion in the grain trade occurred when Europeans were able to bring millions of square kilometers of new land under cultivation in the Americas, Russia, and Australia, an expansion starting in the fifteenth and lasting into the twentieth century. In addition, the consolidation of farmland in Britain and Eastern Europe, and the development of railways and the steamship shifted trade from local to more international patterns.

During this time, debate over tariffs and free trade in grain was fierce. Poor industrial workers relied on cheap bread for sustenance, but farmers wanted their government to create a higher local price to protect them from cheap foreign imports, resulting in legislation such as Britain's Corn Laws.

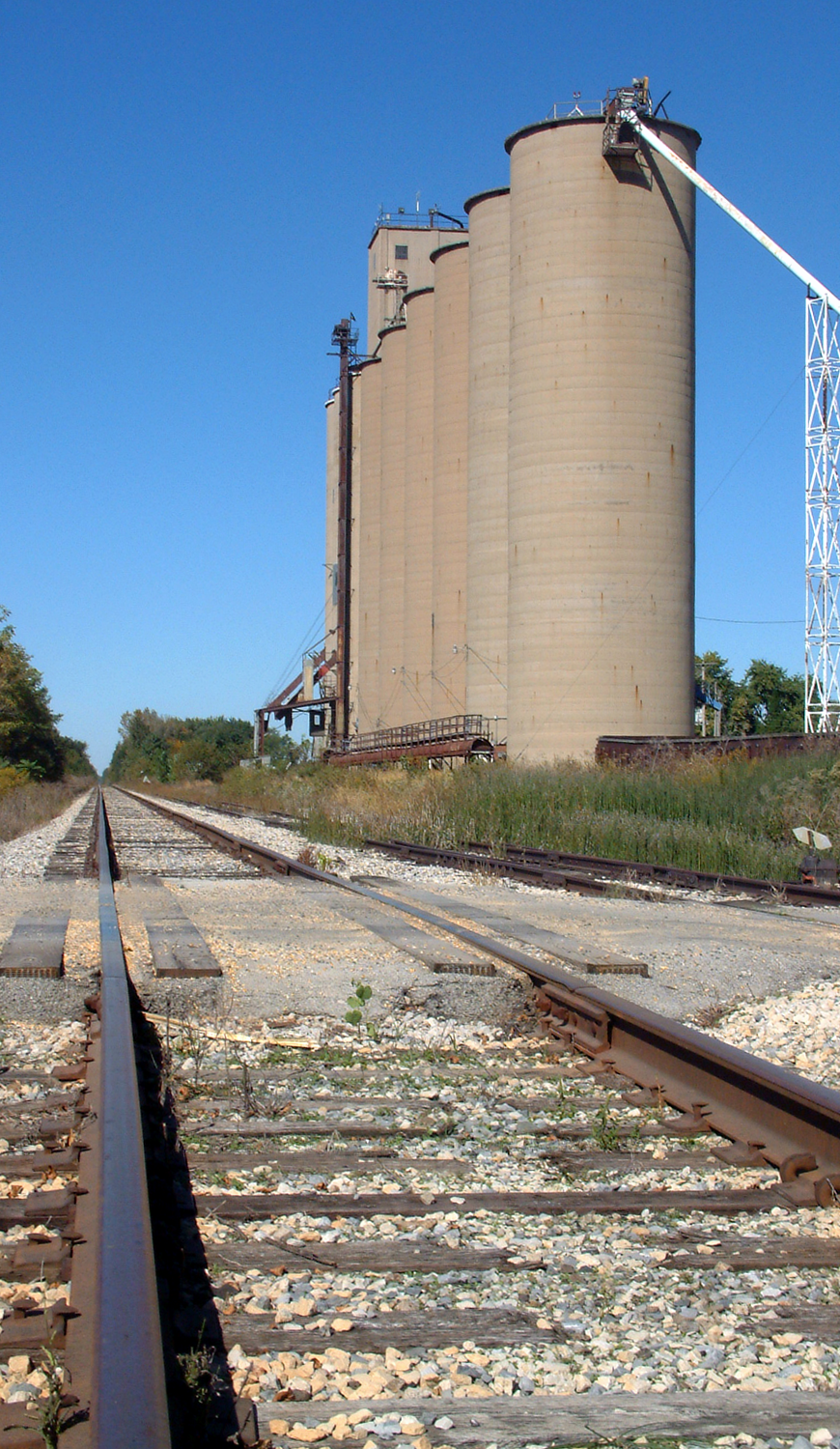
A grain elevator in Indiana, United States

As Britain and other European countries industrialized and the urban population increased, they became net importers of grain from the various breadbaskets of the world. In many parts of Europe, as serfdom was abolished, great estates were accompanied by many inefficient smallholdings, but in the newly colonized regions massive operations were available to not only great nobles, but also to the average farmer. In the United States and Canada, the Homestead Act and the Dominion Lands Act allowed pioneers on the western plains to gain tracts of 160 acres (65 ha) or more for little or no fee. This moved grain production, and hence trading, to a much more massive scale. Grain elevators were built to take in farmers' produce and move it out via the railways to port. Transportation costs were a major concern for farmers in remote regions, however, and any technology that allowed the easier movement of grain was of great assistance; meanwhile, farmers in Europe struggled to remain competitive while operating on a much smaller scale.

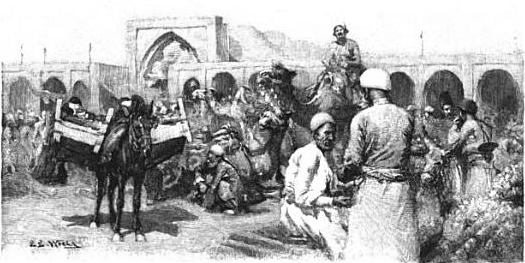
Illustration of a Grain market in Tehran in 1893 from Harpers Magazine. Grain markets have been important centers of commerce in many parts of the world for the last 500 years.

=== 20th century changes ===
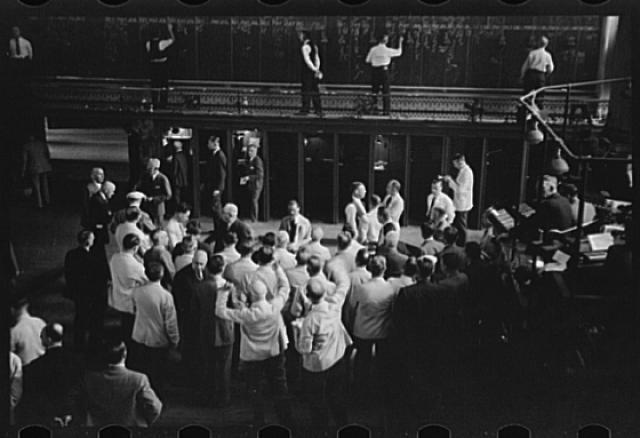
Bidders at the Minneapolis Grain Exchange in 1939

During the Great Depression, farmers in Australia and Canada reacted against the pricing power of the large grain-handling and shipping companies. Their governments created the Australian Wheat Board and the Canadian Wheat Board as monopsony marketing boards, buying all the wheat in those countries for export. Together, those two boards controlled a large percentage of the world's grain trade in the mid-20th century. Additionally, farmers' cooperatives such the wheat pools became a popular alternative to the major grain companies.

At the same time in the Soviet Union and soon after in China, disastrous collectivization programs effectively turned the world's largest farming nations into net importers of grain.

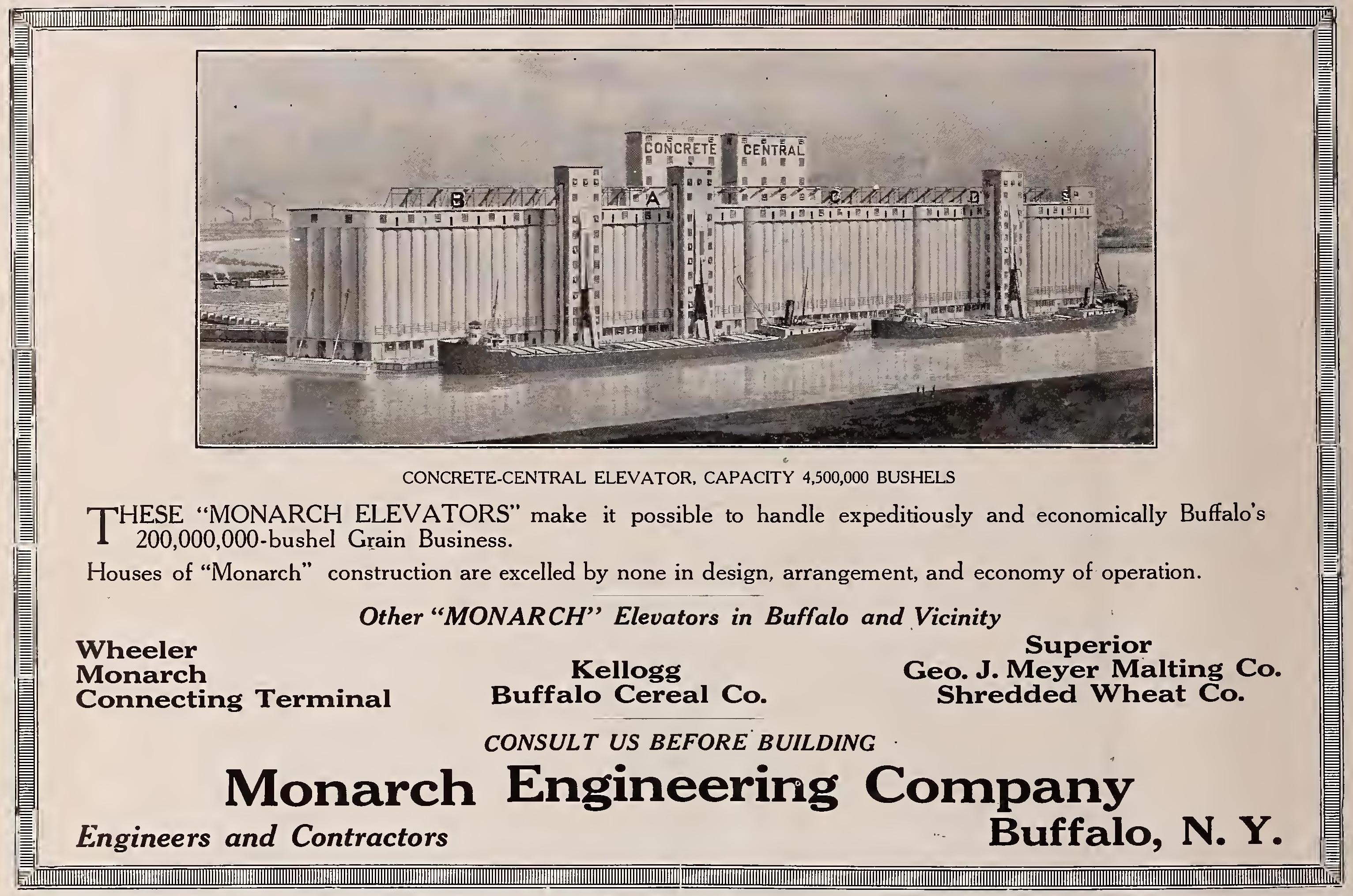
Concrete-Central Elevator of Buffalo, New York with a 4,500,000 bushel capacity built by Monarch Engineering Company before January 1919

By the second half of the 20th century, the grain trade was divided between a few state-owned and privately owned giants. The state giants were Exportkhleb of the Soviet Union, the Canadian Wheat Board, the Australian Wheat Board, the Australian Barley Board, and so on. The largest private companies, known as the "big five", were Cargill, Continental, Louis Dreyfus, Bunge, and Andre, an older European company not to be confused with the more recent André Maggi Group from Brazil.

In 1972, the Soviet Union's wheat crop failed. To prevent shortages in their country, Soviet authorities were able to buy most of the surplus American harvest through private companies without the knowledge of the United States government. This drove up prices across the world, and was dubbed the "great grain robbery" by critics. Subsequently, Americans paid greater attention to large trading companies.

By contrast, in 1980, the US government attempted to use its food power to punish the Soviet Union for its invasion of Afghanistan with an embargo on grain exports. This was seen as a failure in terms of foreign policy and negatively impacted American farmers.

== Modern trade ==
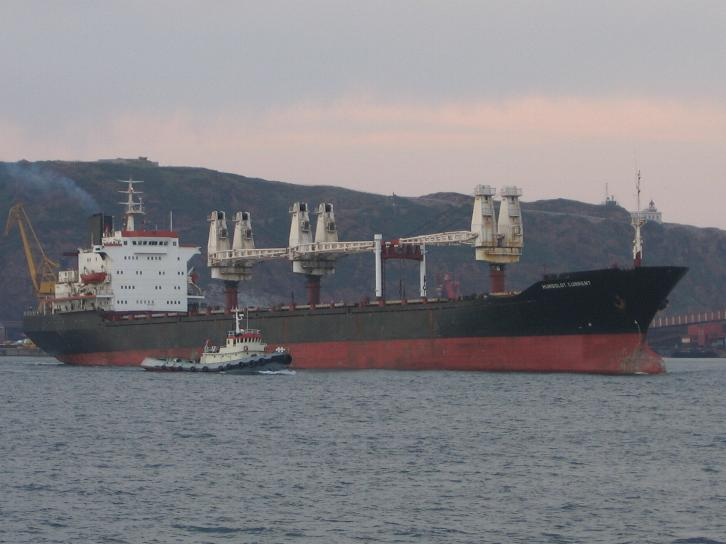
While once grain was sold by the sack, it is now moved in bulk in huge ships like this.

Since the Second World War, the trend in North America has been toward further consolidation of already vast farms. Transportation infrastructure has also promoted more economies of scale. Railways have switched from coal to diesel fuel, and introduced hopper car to carry more mass with less effort. The old wooden grain elevators have been replaced by massive concrete inland terminals and rail transportation has retreated in the face of ever larger trucks.

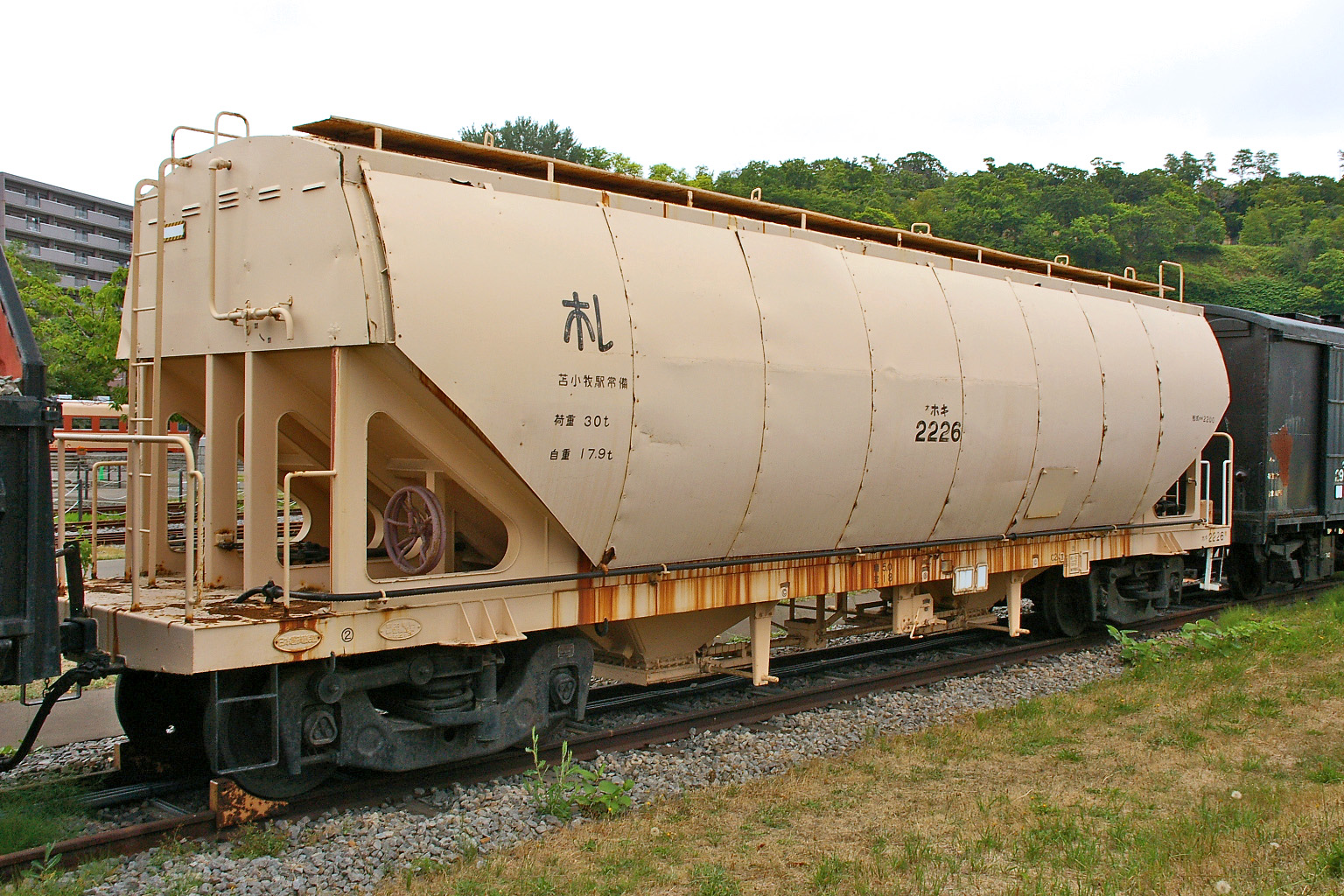
Hopper-bottomed railcars have made moving grain much more efficient.

Modern issues affecting the grain trade include food security concerns, the increasing use of biofuels, the controversy over how to properly store and separate genetically modified and organic crops, the local food movement, the desire of developing countries to achieve market access in industrialized economies, climate change and drought, shifting agricultural patterns, and the development of new crops.

=== Price volatility and protections ===
Price volatility greatly effects countries that are dependent on grain imports, such as certain countries in the MENA region. "Price volatility is a life-and-death issue for many people around the world" warned ICTSD Senior Fellow Sergio Marchi. "Trade policies need to incentivize investment in developing country agriculture, so that poor farmers can build resistance to future price shocks". Two major short-term price fluctuations crises in the early 21st century, during the 2007–2008 world food price crisis and 2022 food crises, have had major negative effects on grain prices globally. Climate change is expected to create major agricultural failures, that will continue to create volatile food price markets especially for bulk goods like grains.

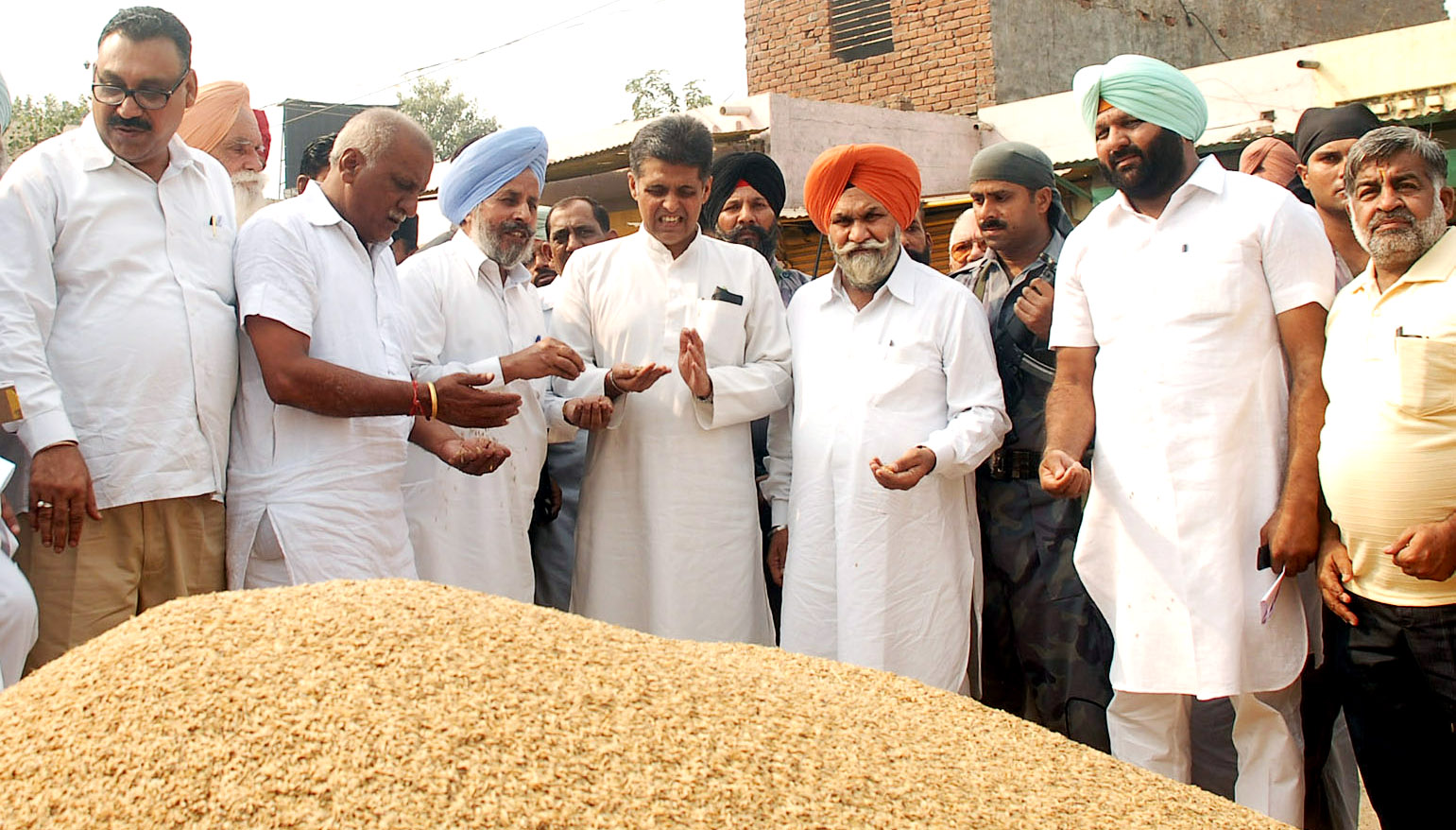
A politician, Manish Tewari, visiting a grain market in the important Punjab region of India, frequently described as the breadbasket of India. India's relation to the international grain market, was an important part of the 2020–2021 Indian farmers' protest -- with many of the more active protests in the Punjab region.

Protection against international market prices has been an important part of how some countries have responded to the volitility of market prices. For example, farmers in the European Union, United States, and Japan are protected by agricultural subsidies. The European Union's programs are organized under the Common Agricultural Policy. The agricultural policy of the United States is demonstrated through the "farm bill", while rice production in Japan is also protected and subsidized. Farmers in other countries has attempted to have these policies disallowed by the World Trade Organization, or attempted to negotiate them away though the Cairns Group, at the same time the wheat boards have been reformed and many tariffs have been greatly reduced, leading to a further globalization of the industry. For example, in 2008 Mexico was required by the North American Free Trade Agreement (NAFTA) to remove its tariffs on US and Canadian maize.

Similarly, protections in other contexts, such as guaranteed prices for grains in India, have been an important lifeline for small farmers in the context of further industrialization of agriculture. When the BJP Party government of Narendra Modi attempted to repeal guaranteed prices for farmers on key grains like wheat, farmers throughout the country rose in protest.

== See also ==
- Bread of Ukraine
- Cash crop
- Monoculture
