= List of countries by energy consumption per capita =

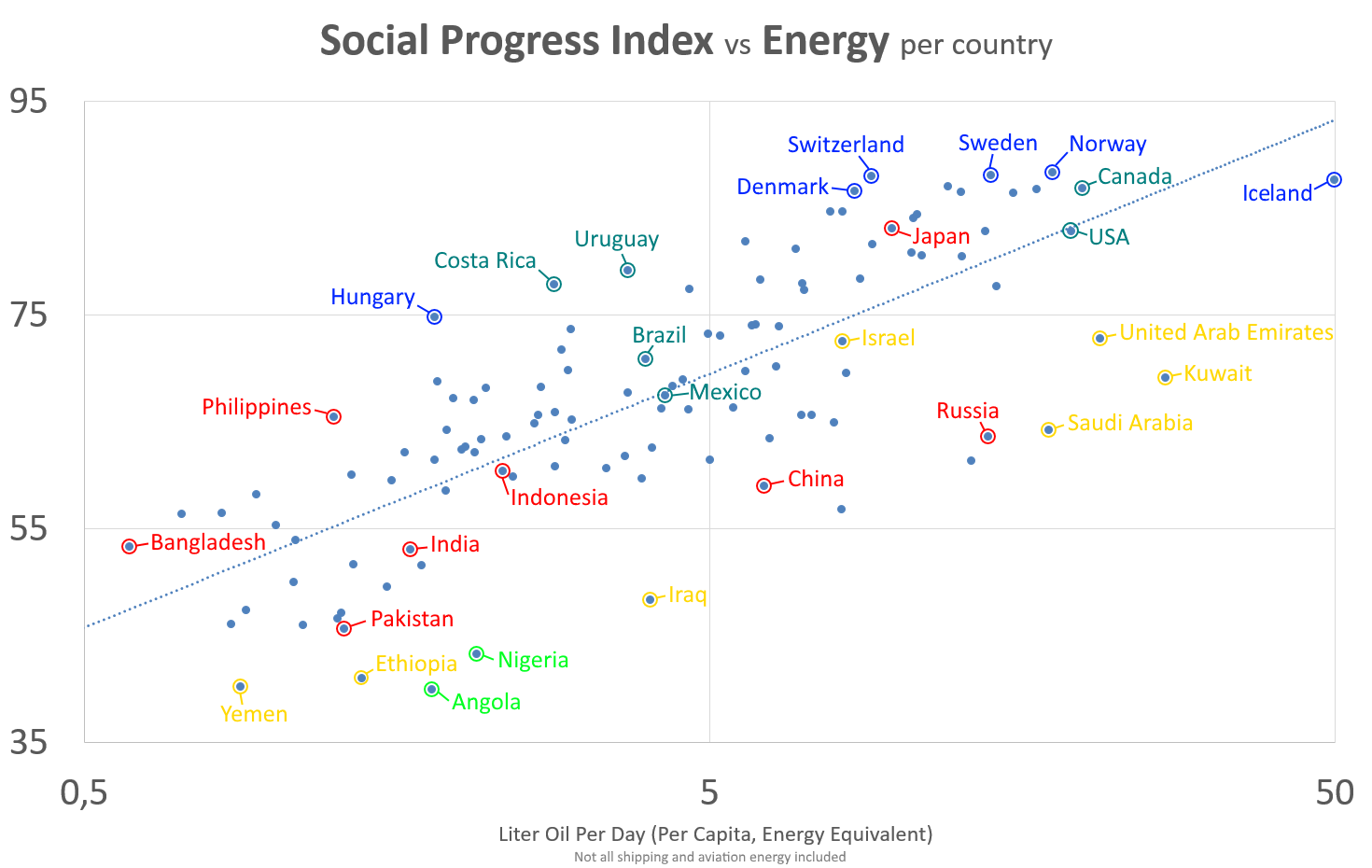
Social Progress Index vs Energy Use per capita, 2015. List of countries by Social Progress Index.

World energy consumption per capita based on 2021 data

This is a list of countries by total energy consumption per capita. This is not the consumption of end-users but all energy needed as input to produce fuel and electricity for end-users. It is known as total primary energy supply (TPES), a term used to indicate the sum of production and imports subtracting exports and storage changes (see also Worldwide energy supply). Numbers are from The World Bank - World Development Indicators.

The data is given in kilograms of oil equivalent per year, and gigajoules per year, and in watts, as average equivalent power.

Notes on conversions

- 1 kg of oil equivalent (kgoe) = 11.63 kWh or 1 kWh = 0.08598 kgoe
- 1000 kgoe = 42 GJ
- 1 GJ/a = 31.7 W average
- 1 W average = 8.76 kWh per year (365 × 24 Wh per year)

== List ==
Total energy consumption per capita
Country/Territory	World Bank (2022)	Our World in Data (2021/22)
Country/Territory	kgoe/a	kWh
Afghanistan		677
Albania	780.7	14,100
Algeria	1,500.3	15,252
Angola	423.1	2,791
Antigua and Barbuda		29,464
Argentina	1,809.0	21,994
Armenia	1,347.6	17,685
Australia	4,889.6	63,459
Austria	3,465.3	42,685
Azerbaijan	1,720.3	18,748
Bahamas		35,448
Bahrain	10,701.8	161,111
Bangladesh	297.1	2,912
Barbados		23,026
Belarus	2,862.5	31,133
Belgium	4,333.0	58,396
Belize		7,438
Benin	375.8	2,485
Bhutan		27,785
Bolivia	798.3	7,062
Bosnia and Herzegovina	2,270.7	23,013
Botswana	1,165.1	9,385
Brazil	1,429.0	17,300
Brunei Darussalam	9,537.1	103,268
Bulgaria	2,968.1	34,176
Burkina Faso	312.9	905
Burundi		294
Cambodia	501.6	4,035
Cameroon	384.1	1,594
Canada	7,632.3	102,160
Cape Verde		7,249
Central African Republic		286
Chad	198.5	
Chile	2,117.8	25,343
China	2,690.6	31,051
Colombia	775.5	11,747
Comoros		1,634
Congo, Dem. Rep.	390.9	411
Congo, Rep.	627.6	2,348
Costa Rica	1,009.4	11,958
Cote d'Ivoire	471.8	2,371
Croatia	2,155.0	23,468
Cuba	815.6	9,230
Cyprus	1,682.7	25,360
Czech Republic	3,897.1	44,242
Denmark	2,628.9	32,198
Djibouti		2,785
Dominica		10,548
Dominican Republic	950.5	9,988
Ecuador	904.7	12,150
Egypt	900.4	9,960
El Salvador	768.7	7,076
Equatorial Guinea	1,283.9	12,399
Eritrea	289.5	914
Estonia	3,558.5	46,505
Eswatini	958.9	5,981
Ethiopia	377.9	872
Fiji		9,223
Finland	5,681.9	58,966
France	3,102.4	36,052
Gabon	2,096.2	8,010
Gambia		931
Georgia	1,543.6	20,835
Germany	3,236.7	40,977
Ghana	359.2	3,483
Greece	1,960.7	30,410
Grenada		9,432
Guatemala	887.8	5,712
Guinea		1,282
Guinea-Bissau		677
Guyana		13,690
Haiti	377.5	1,031
Honduras	573.3	5,087
Hong Kong	1,566.4	29,152
Hungary	2,672.6	26,660
Iceland	15,856.4	165,871
India	712.2	7,143
Indonesia	935.8	9,854
Iran, Islamic Rep.	3,266.1	38,133
Iraq	1,411.6	14,392
Ireland	2,598.4	37,761
Israel	2,496.3	33,643
Italy	2,411.7	28,910
Jamaica	968.9	12,236
Japan	3,135.9	39,985
Jordan	754.3	9,183
Kazakhstan	3,562.3	44,702
Kenya	539.8	1,953
Kiribati		2,447
North Korea	640.5	3,834
South Korea	5,413.4	68,126
Kosovo		16,777
Kuwait	9,129.6	103,883
Kyrgyzstan	645.0	9,275
Laos	815.1	18,847
Latvia	2,254.0	21,436
Lebanon	617.5	18,832
Lesotho		2,133
Liberia		1,065
Libya	2,539.2	28,270
Lithuania	2,428.0	23,151
Luxembourg	4,875.2	60,334
Macao		21,400
Madagascar	308.7	508
Malawi		465
Malaysia	2,867.1	39,587
Maldives		17,669
Mali		1,169
Malta	1,456.2	74,324
Mauritania		3,989
Mauritius	1,095.7	19,725
Mexico	1,419.8	19,009
Moldova	1,422.6	16,006
Mongolia	1,890.6	22,408
Montenegro	1,674.1	18,940
Morocco	603.0	6,855
Mozambique	358.6	2,241
Myanmar	399.5	3,065
Namibia	692.5	8,748
Nauru		21,610
Nepal	520.0	1,608
Netherlands	3,575.8	56,001
New Zealand	3,729.8	44,939
Nicaragua	608.2	4,265
Niger	162.0	410
Nigeria	333.1	2,548
North Macedonia	1,480.6	13,875
Norway	4,629.7	96,926
Oman	5,867.3	90,751
Pakistan	470.7	4,243
Palestine		3,999
Panama	1,062.7	27,067
Papua New Guinea		2,123
Paraguay	1,045.0	15,782
Peru	826.7	9,835
Philippines	550.8	5,067
Poland	2,803.4	30,065
Portugal	1,948.5	25,094
Qatar	16,683.7	194,222
Romania	1,655.8	18,347
Russia	5,601.1	55,459
Rwanda	373.0	471
Saint Lucia		13,600
Saint Vincent and the Grenadines		8,245
Samoa		7,302
São Tomé and Príncipe		3,310
Saudi Arabia	7,529.6	87,707
Senegal	316.0	2,505
Serbia	2,441.2	27,641
Seychelles		45,934
Singapore	6,630.4	147,085
Slovakia	3,087.7	33,888
Slovenia	3,039.0	34,391
Solomon Islands		1,892
Somalia		217
South Africa	1,976.6	22,351
South Sudan	69.0	732
Spain	2,406.6	33,615
Sri Lanka	473.9	4,348
Sudan	411.8	2,317
Suriname	1,739.2	20,285
Sweden	4,326.6	59,927
Switzerland	2,591.2	33,351
Syrian Arab Republic	454.5	5,507
Taiwan		55,607
Tajikistan	375.2	7,675
Tanzania	405.1	907
Thailand	1,857.3	19,617
Togo	425.4	1,116
Tonga		6,699
Trinidad and Tobago	11,038.4	107,269
Tunisia	956.0	9,524
Turkey	1,841.6	22,824
Turkmenistan	5,625.6	71,367
Uganda	482.8	767
Ukraine	1,493.0	16,309
United Arab Emirates	8,335.8	148,577
United Kingdom	2,263.4	30,098
United States	6,505.6	78,754
Uruguay	1,626.1	18,317
Uzbekistan	1,381.8	16,930
Vanuatu		2,957
Venezuela	1,478.1	21,683
Vietnam	1,023.1	12,983
Yemen	68.9	1,080
Zambia	800.7	3,419
Zimbabwe	416.6	2,635

== Historical ==
Historical total energy consumption per capita
Country/Territory	2003			2013		
Country/Territory	kgoe/a	GJ/a	W	kgoe/a	GJ/a	W
Afghanistan	90	3.78	119.8			
Albania	648.3	27.23	863.2	800.6	33.62	1065.9
Algeria	1138.2	47.81	1515.5	1246.0	52.33	1658.9
Angola	716.5	30.09	953.9	654.9	27.51	871.9
Argentina	1846.8	77.57	2458.9	1894.6	79.57	2522.5
Armenia	790.8	33.22	1052.9	969.3	40.71	1290.5
Australia	5593.2	234.92	7446.8	5586.3	234.63	7437.7
Austria	4033.6	169.41	5370.3	3917.8	164.55	5216.2
Azerbaijan	1307.5	54.91	1740.8	1474.0	61.91	1962.5
Bahrain	7753.7	325.65	10323.2	10171.7	427.21	13542.6
Bangladesh	208.8	8.77	278.1	215.5	9.05	286.9
Belarus	2922.0	122.73	3890.4	2881.5	121.02	3836.4
Belgium	5585.6	234.59	7436.6	5039.0	211.64	6708.9
Benin	412.8	17.34	549.6	393.4	16.52	523.8
Bolivia	737.4	30.97	981.7	785.5	32.99	1045.8
Bosnia and Herzegovina	1703.4	71.54	2267.9	1688.0	70.89	2247.4
Botswana	1127.8	47.37	1501.6	1098.4	46.13	1462.4
Brazil	1362.5	57.23	1814.1	1437.8	60.39	1914.3
Brunei Darussalam	8308.4	348.95	11061.9	7392.9	310.50	9842.9
Bulgaria	2370.1	99.55	3155.6	2327.4	97.75	3098.7
Cambodia	355.4	14.93	473.1	396.2	16.64	527.5
Cameroon	362.7	15.23	482.9	330.7	13.89	440.3
Canada	7379.6	309.94	9825.2	7202.2	302.49	9589.0
Chile	1806.7	75.88	2405.5	2201.2	92.45	2930.6
China	1806.8	75.88	2405.5	2226.3	93.50	2964.1
Colombia	696.3	29.24	927.1	668.5	28.08	890.0
Congo, Dem. Rep.	360.2	15.13	479.5	292.3	12.28	389.1
Congo, Rep.	363.5	15.27	483.9	555.8	23.34	740.0
Costa Rica	997.8	41.91	1328.5	1029.0	43.22	1370.0
Cote d'Ivoire	484.9	20.37	645.6	605.3	25.42	805.9
Croatia	1931.9	81.14	2572.2	1813.9	76.19	2415.1
Cuba	975.3	40.96	1298.5	1030.9	43.30	1372.5
Cyprus	2215.2	93.04	2949.3	1691.1	71.03	2251.5
Czech Republic	4192.8	176.10	5582.3	3989.9	167.58	5312.2
Denmark	3470.4	145.76	4620.5	3107.1	130.50	4136.9
Dominican Republic	840.0	35.28	1118.4	731.3	30.72	973.7
Ecuador	836.3	35.12	1113.5	979.8	41.15	1304.4
Egypt	903.1	37.93	1202.4	885.0	37.17	1178.3
El Salvador	676.9	28.43	901.2	693.4	29.12	923.3
Eritrea	141.7	5.95	188.7			
Estonia	4154.5	174.49	5531.3	4623.3	194.18	6155.4
Ethiopia	400.3	16.81	532.9	507.0	21.29	675.0
Finland	6787.2	285.06	9036.5	6074.7	255.14	8087.9
France	4030.5	169.28	5366.2	3839.9	161.27	5112.4
Gabon	1417.6	59.54	1887.4	1434.9	60.27	1910.4
Georgia	700.3	29.41	3142.8	1032.1	43.35	1374.2
Germany	4003.3	168.14	5329.9	3867.6	162.44	5149.4
Ghana	382.2	16.05	508.9	343.6	14.43	457.5
Greece	2440.5	102.50	3249.3	2134.1	89.63	2841.3
Guatemala	712.8	29.94	949.0	767.6	32.24	1022
Haiti	229.0	9.62	304.9	393.2	16.51	523.5
Honduras	600.9	25.24	800.1	662.4	27.82	882
Hong Kong	1951.3	81.96	2598.0	1938.4	81.41	2580.7
Hungary	2566.7	107.80	3417.3	2280.4	95.78	3036.1
Iceland	16882.5	709.06	22477.4	18177.3	763.44	24201.2
India	565.6	23.76	753.1	606.1	25.45	806.9
Indonesia	866.5	36.39	1153.7	850.2	35.71	1132
Iran, Islamic Rep.	2816.8	118.30	3750.2	2960.4	124.34	3941.5
Iraq	1180.3	49.57	1571.4	1466.6	61.6	1952.6
Ireland	3217.7	135.14	4284.0	2840.2	119.29	3781.4
Israel	3005.4	126.23	4001.3	2970.8	124.77	3955.3
Italy	2814.6	118.21	3747.4	2579.5	108.34	3434.3
Jamaica	1130.2	47.47	1504.7	1083.6	45.51	1442.7
Japan	3898.4	163.73	5190.3	3570.4	149.96	4753.7
Jordan	1191.4	50.04	1586.2	1071	44.98	1426
Kazakhstan	4595.1	193.00	6118.0	4786.7	201.04	6373
Kenya	482.9	20.28	642.9	491.7	20.65	654.7
North Korea	761.2	31.97	1013.4	580.6	24.38	773
South Korea	5059.9	212.52	6736.8	5253.5	220.65	6994.5
Kosovo	1372.1	57.63	1826.9	1296.7	54.46	1726.4
Kuwait	12204.3	512.58	16248.8	9757.4	409.81	12991.1
Kyrgyzstan	535.6	22.50	713.2	690.4	29	919.2
Latvia	1971.3	82.79	2624.6	2159.2	90.69	2874.8
Lebanon	1526.1	64.10	2031.8	1337.2	56.16	1780.3
Libya	3013.0	126.54	4011.5	2711.3	113.87	3609.8
Lithuania	2107.0	88.49	2805.2	2356.6	98.98	3137.6
Luxembourg	8342.5	350.39	11107.3	7310.3	307.03	9732.9
Malaysia	2557.8	107.43	3405.5	3019.8	126.83	4020.6
Malta	2012.9	84.54	2680.0	3019.8	126.83	4020.6
Mexico	1570.3	65.95	2090.8	1545.8	64.92	2058
Moldova	730.7	30.69	972.8	862.7	36.23	1148.5
Mongolia	1188.7	49.92	1582.6	1826.5	76.71	2431.7
Montenegro	1303.5	54.75	1735.5	1651.3	69.35	2198.5
Morocco	516.7	21.70	687.9	564.4	23.7	751.4
Mozambique	436.0	18.31	580.5	407.4	17.11	542.4
Myanmar	291.8	12.26	388.6	312.8	13.14	416.4
Namibia	702.5	29.50	935.3	742.3	31.18	988.4
Nepal	341.1	14.32	454.1	369.7	15.53	492.2
Netherlands	5021.0	210.88	6685.0	4605.4	193.43	6131.7
New Zealand	4166.4	174.99	5547.2	4391.6	184.45	5846.9
Nicaragua	542.0	22.76	721.6	593.7	24.93	790.4
Nigeria	713.6	29.97	950.1	773	32.47	1029.2
North Macedonia	1402.3	58.90	1867.0	1349.5	56.68	1796.7
Norway	6637.4	278.77	8837.0	6438.8	270.43	8572.6
Oman	7187.7	301.88	9569.7	6232.5	261.76	8297.9
Pakistan	487.3	20.47	648.8	474.9	19.94	632.2
Panama	1072.7	45.05	1428.2	1057.5	44.41	1407.9
Paraguay	741.9	31.16	987.7	764.1	32.09	1017.4
Peru	667.1	28.02	888.2	708.3	29.75	943.1
Philippines	434.0	18.23	577.8	457.1	19.2	608.6
Poland	2657.0	111.59	3537.5	2565.4	107.75	3415.6
Portugal	2213.1	92.95	2946.5	2082.8	87.48	2773.1
Qatar	12799.4	537.58	17041.2	19120.3	803.05	25456.8
Romania	1632.2	68.55	2173.1	1592.1	66.87	2119.8
Russia	4943.1	207.61	6581.2	5093.1	213.91	6780.9
Saudi Arabia	6167.9	259.05	8212.0	6363.4	267.26	8472.2
Senegal	272.0	11.42	362.1	261	10.96	347.5
Serbia	2141.0	89.92	2850.5	2078.5	87.3	2767.3
Singapore	6455.7	271.14	8595.2	4833.4	203	6435.2
Slovakia	3280.5	137.78	4367.6	3178.3	133.49	4231.6
Slovenia	3520.2	147.85	4686.7	3323.2	139.58	4424.6
South Africa	2737.8	114.99	3645.1	2655.9	111.55	3536
Spain	2772.7	116.45	3691.5	2503.8	105.16	3333.6
Sri Lanka	477.9	20.07	636.3	487.5	20.48	649.1
Sudan	370.9	15.58	493.9	374.8	15.74	499
Sweden	5468.2	229.67	7280.4	5131.5	215.52	6832.1
Switzerland	3348.8	140.65	4458.5	3304	138.77	4399
Syrian Arab Republic	1063.0	44.64	1415.2	668.1	28.06	889.6
Tajikistan	335.5	14.09	446.7	302.7	12.71	403.1
Tanzania	447.8	18.81	596.1	469.7	19.73	625.4
Thailand	1698.9	71.35	2261.9	1987.6	83.48	2646.3
Togo	446.1	18.74	593.9	462.6	19.43	615.9
Trinidad and Tobago	15913.3	668.36	21187.0	14537.6	610.58	19355.3
Tunisia	912.8	38.34	1215.3	956.5	40.17	1273.5
Turkey	1445.1	60.69	1924.0	1528.2	64.18	2034.6
Turkmenistan	4225.9	177.49	5626.3	5011.6	210.49	6672.5
Ukraine	2844.9	119.49	3787.7	2553.2	107.23	3399.3
United Arab Emirates	8271.5	347.40	11012.6	7691	323.02	10239.8
United Kingdom	3254.1	136.67	4332.5	2977.7	125.06	3964.5
United States	7164.5	300.91	9538.8	6915.8	290.47	9207.8
Uruguay	1240.9	52.12	1652.1	1350.5	56.72	1798.1
Uzbekistan	1533.0	64.39	2041.1	1419.5	59.62	1889.9
Venezuela	2668.6	112.08	3553.0	2271.2	95.39	3023.9
Vietnam	681.4	28.62	907.2	667.6	28.04	888.9
Yemen	297.9	12.51	396.6	323.7	13.6	431
Zambia	627.8	26.37	835.9	631.5	26.52	840.7
Zimbabwe	764.0	32.09	1017.2	757.5	31.82	1008.6

== See also ==
- List of countries by carbon dioxide emissions per capita
- List of countries by energy intensity
- List of countries by renewable electricity production
- List of countries by food energy intake
- European countries by fossil fuel use (% of total energy)
- European countries by electricity consumption per person
