= Bread of Ukraine =

- Industry: Food industry, agriculture
- Predecessor: Main Directorate of Bread Products; Main Directorate of Compound Feed Industry
- Founded: 22 August 1996
- Headquarters: Dubno
- Services: Grain operator of Ukraine

State joint-stock company Bread of Ukraine or Khlib Ukrainy (Ukrainian: ДАК «Хліб України») is a state-owned company, a leading operator on the Ukrainian grain market, in the field of production of bread and other flour products. JSC "Bread Ukraine" as the legal successor of the Main Directorate of Bread Products and the Main Directorate of Compound Feed Industry of the Ministry of Agriculture and Food of Ukraine was one of the leading operators on the domestic grain market.

== History ==
It was created on August 22, 1996. In 1999–2002 and 2008–2010, the "Bread of Ukraine" was headed by Ivan Rishniak.

On May 28, 2010, Andriy Yefimchenko was appointed deputy chairman of the board of the JSC "Bread of Ukraine".

In 2010, on the basis of "Bread Investbud" (a subsidiary of JSC "Bread of Ukraine", created in 2004 to repair elevators and supply fuel), the State Food and Grain Corporation of Ukraine was created, to which 36 of the best elevators of JSC "Bread of Ukraine" (linear and port), as well as some bread factories. According to the government, the new corporation was to become the main grain trading operator and a competitor to private grain traders.

The organizational structure of JSC "Bread Ukraine" was a centralized, regionally branched network consisting of 125 subsidiaries in all regions of Ukraine and the company's head office in Kyiv. Subsidiary enterprises of the company were the harvesting capacities of elevators, grain-receiving enterprises, bread bases, a seed processing plant for seed preparation, two port elevators, the production facilities of bread product plants, which include mills, grain and compound feed plants, and a research institute for bread products.
