= Food power =

Use of agriculture as a means of political control

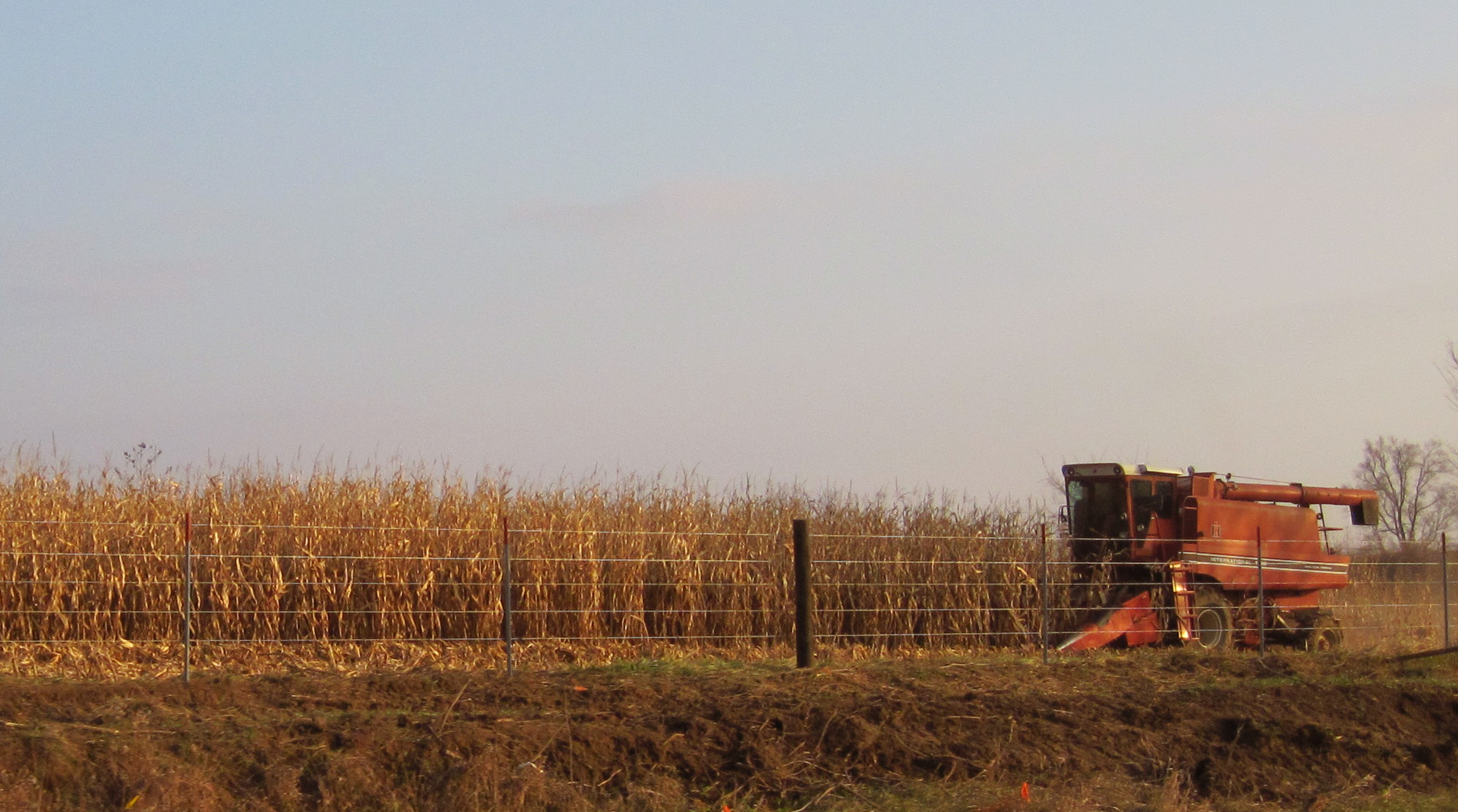
Harvesting corn in Iowa, United States.

In international politics, food power is the use of agriculture as a means of political control whereby one nation or group of nations offers or withholds commodities from another nation or group of nations in order to manipulate behavior. Its potential use as a weapon was recognised after OPEC’s earlier use of oil as a political weapon. Food has a major influence on political actions of a nation. In response to acts of food power, a nation usually acts in the interest of its citizens to provide food.

Food power is an integral part of the politics of food. The idea of food power is used in embargoes, employment, and food politics. In order for a nation to utilize food power effectively, the nation must effectively apply and display scarcity, supply concentration, demand dispersion, and action independence. On the smaller scale, particularly in some African countries, food power has been used as a weapon by opposing sides in internal wars and conflicts against their own people.

== Historical background ==
There are five global exporters that export enough agriculture to exert this hypothetical food power: the European Union, the United States, Brazil, China, and Canada. Forced to rely on these nations in times of shortage, food-importing countries may face food crises if needed supplies are withheld. But while political leaders in food-importing countries have expressed misgivings over their dependence, food-exporting nations generally do not withhold food, as agricultural producers in these nations press their governments to continue to export.

== Policy ==
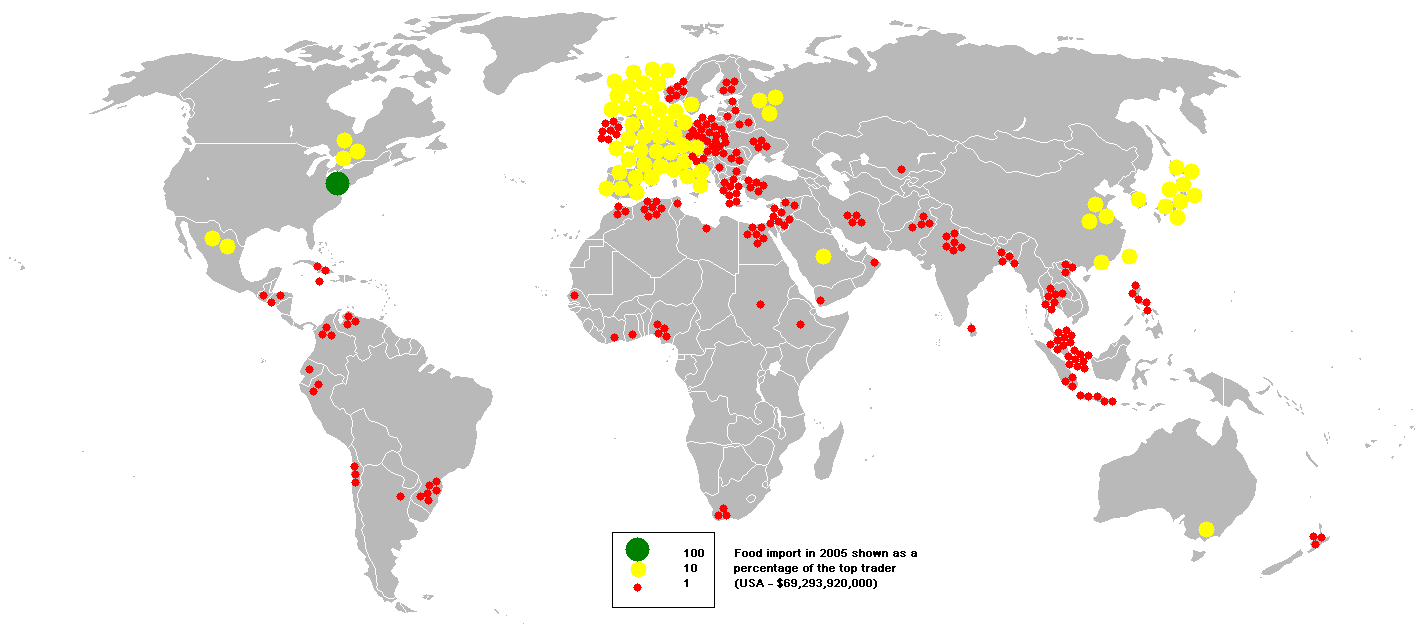
Food imports in 2005

Food politics are the political aspects of the production, control, regulation, inspection and distribution of food. The politics can be affected by the ethical, cultural, medical and environmental disputes concerning proper farming, agricultural and retailing methods and regulations. Food power is an integral part of the politics of food.

“Food is a weapon”, stated Earl Butz, the United States Secretary of Agriculture, in 1974. OPEC's use of oil as a political weapon brought on the possibility for America to use food as a tool against other states and to further the US's goals. There are alternative uses of food power as well. An importer can refuse to continue import unless political concessions are made. This would have the same effects that an exporter refusing to export would have. An example of this would be American reduction of the Cuban sugar quota. In simple terms, the demand concentration (one importer being the dominant buyer) and supply dispersion (several exporters competing to sell the same product) an importer can try to use this exchange politically to their favor; this is especially effective if the exporter has little else to export (low action independence).

=== Food power and food security ===
Food security and food power are not the same thing. However, they are often directly related. Food security is when all people of a region at all times have enough food for an active, healthy life. Food power is related when a government, company, leader, country etc. takes this security away in order to get something in return. Many countries employ the exploit of food power to threaten another country's food security. A country's welfare correlates directly with the welfare of its people therefore each country wants to have an appropriate supply of food for its citizens. This want, however, can easily be used as leverage in the politics of food, demonstrating food power.

=== Food power and embargoes ===
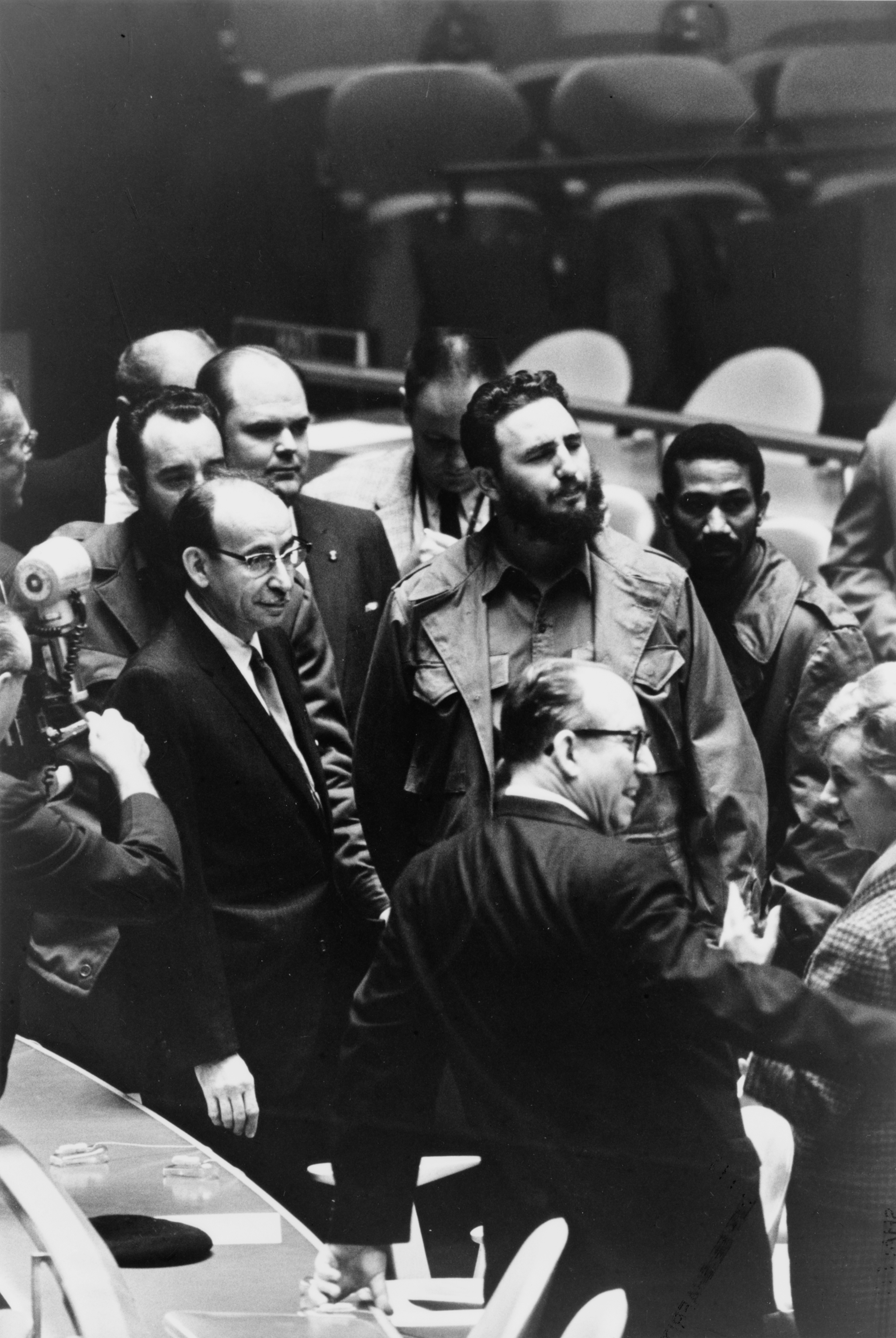
Fidel Castro at a meeting of the United Nations General Assembly

An embargo is not the same as Food Power, however, food power can be used in an embargo. In fact, embargoes that do not involve food in their list of restricted items often fail. For example, on August 20, 1914 the Allied Powers began an embargo on important items that were normally shipped to Germany. However, the embargo was not complete nor effective until food was added to the list of restricted materials. Food has the real power. After food was introduced the blockade began to strangle Germany's economy because they were dependent on imports for food. Because the Allied Powers used the power of food in their embargo, Germany was forced to resort to desperate measures and eventually failed despite them.

In the early 1980s, the United States posed a grain embargo upon the Soviet Union. This was an attempt by the US to utilize food power, however, it was not confirmed. The Soviets thus imported grain from different suppliers, leading to an increase in grain imports during that time period, only at a higher cost. Another unsuccessful embargo food power attempt was imposed by the UN Security Council in 1990 upon Iraq.

Another example of an embargo is the United States embargo against Cuba. This is still an ongoing embargo, and, due to the declining situation and health of Cuba's people, the embargo has been subject to much protest.

== Employment ==
=== Structural conditions ===
Food power can only be used effectively if certain structural conditions apply:

1. Scarcity: If demand is high and supply is limited the value of a given commodity increases. The price often reflects the potential of the goods as a weapon; as it indicates the importance attached to it. Example: If a consumer is prepared to pay a high price for monetary terms he may also be willing to pay a high price in political concessions.
2. Supply Concentration: Supply should only be in the hands of few producers/ sellers, as this makes possible for limited competition, price fixes, or potentially a monopoly.
3. Demand Dispersion: Allows sellers to play the consumers against each other as well as increase prices or make terms conditional. This favors the use of economic goods food as a weapon.
4. Action Independence: In order to ensure affectivity the seller/producer most control his own assets. Either the seller/producer must be able to control the production process, perhaps through governmental control over companies carrying out the production), or he must have access to means on the other dimensions to ensure that he can maintain or extend control over his assets.

The four conditions listed above MUST be simultaneously present in order to turn an economic asset food into a political instrument. This does not necessarily mean that the asset will be used whenever the four conditions above are present. Such a decision would be considered only if there were further conditions, for example, the nature of a given conflict and judgment, goals, alternative means, and judgment of utility.

=== Employment as an economic weapon ===
There are several uses for employing economic weapons against one country or another. One use for using economic weapons would concern the seller/buyer bargaining on the conditions of a business contract. This would include price, transportation, timetable for consignment and payment, etc. Although this is an example of the successful application of food power, it is not a political objective. Another use concerns the economic objectives other than these relating to the transaction of goods; to the general economic policy of the buyer. This would be balance of payments, general problems, such as inflation or taxation and land holding. What distinguishes this from the first is the fact that there is no link between the conditions laid down and the transfer of product. The conditions refer to the economic realm of life. A political use would be one concerning the buyer’s foreign and defense policies. Many believe there is a moral threshold between economy and politics, making the use of economic means for political gains questionable. Examples of the use of economic weapons for political aims are boycotts against certain countries as well as the buying of votes in the UN. A fourth purpose pertains to the basic assumption of the third category: the governments no longer accept each other as legitimate. The economic goals are no longer seen as a means of influencing an opposite government but rather to stimulate opposition and achieve the overthrow or capitulation of the government.

=== United States ===
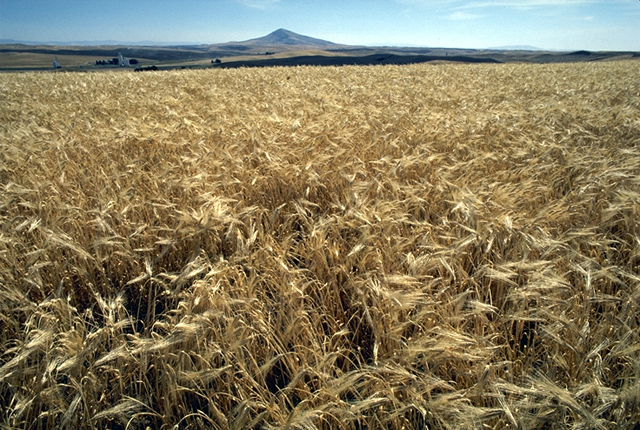
Barley is a major animal feed crop.

During the time the United States was the most dominant in all areas like military, energy, exports, etc. Food Power was not really thought about. However, since some of those powers have since diminished, the power of food has come to the surface. In the realm of food, The United States remains at the top, unchallenged. The United States has the position of being the largest producer and exporter of food. While other nations, predominantly developing nations but even some of the richest oil-exporting nations, are beginning to have food shortages and becoming more and more dependent on imported food from the United States, giving it more and more power. This allows the United States to expect friendly behavior from the countries that import American food. It is also likely that the United States would have some form of influence over these countries. Even some of the poorest OPEC countries have become dependent on U.S. wheat. Therefore, there is a possibility that the United States could restrict its food exports for political purposes. The United States could use this Food power as a means of exerting pressure on OPEC countries. Food power will be most effective in times of food shortage or famine because this is when those countries that have some dependence on the United States are most desperate.

The U.S. has imposed restrictions on certain food items imported to the country from other countries. One of the ways the U.S. does this is by holding back on exporting food. Reasons for the punishment of another country vary; however, they can be broken down into two main groups: Foreign containment objective and market development/humanitarian objectives. The foreign containment objective tends to punish those countries who are threatening to the U.S. An example of such a threat would be countries under other forms of government. More examples related to the containment objective would be no aid to communist countries, socialist governments, countries who support radical regimes, regimes with an inadequate democracy who are too weak to be anti-communist (effectively), and countries who will not accept U.S. agreements. An example of market development and humanitarian objectives would fall under a category of countries that are trying to compete with the U.S. economically. The U.S. will execute foreign aid punishments to countries trying to nationalize property of U.S. companies, countries who want to take over functions by U.S. companies, and countries trying to initiate nationalistic economic policies.

The U.S. has modified its stance since the 1970s, when the State Department and the CIA issued reports exploring the potential of food embargoes. Congressional Bill H.R. 5426, the Trade Sanctions Reform and Export Enhancement Act of 2000, removed agricultural export sanctions applied to Libya, Sudan, and North Korea (agricultural trade with Cuba remained under some restrictions) and gave Congress veto power over unilateral presidential actions in this regard.

=== Africa ===
Food politics in Africa differs from the cases in North America and Europe in that there is a case of small scale food power in Africa, particularly in Sudan. Some experts say that the cases of famine and food insecurity in Africa are due to inconsistent output of food production and the downward spiral of the interaction between population growth and environmental sustainability. But upon closer inspection, it is revealed that nature is not the only catalyst for Africa’s numerous food insecurity issues.

==== Sudan ====
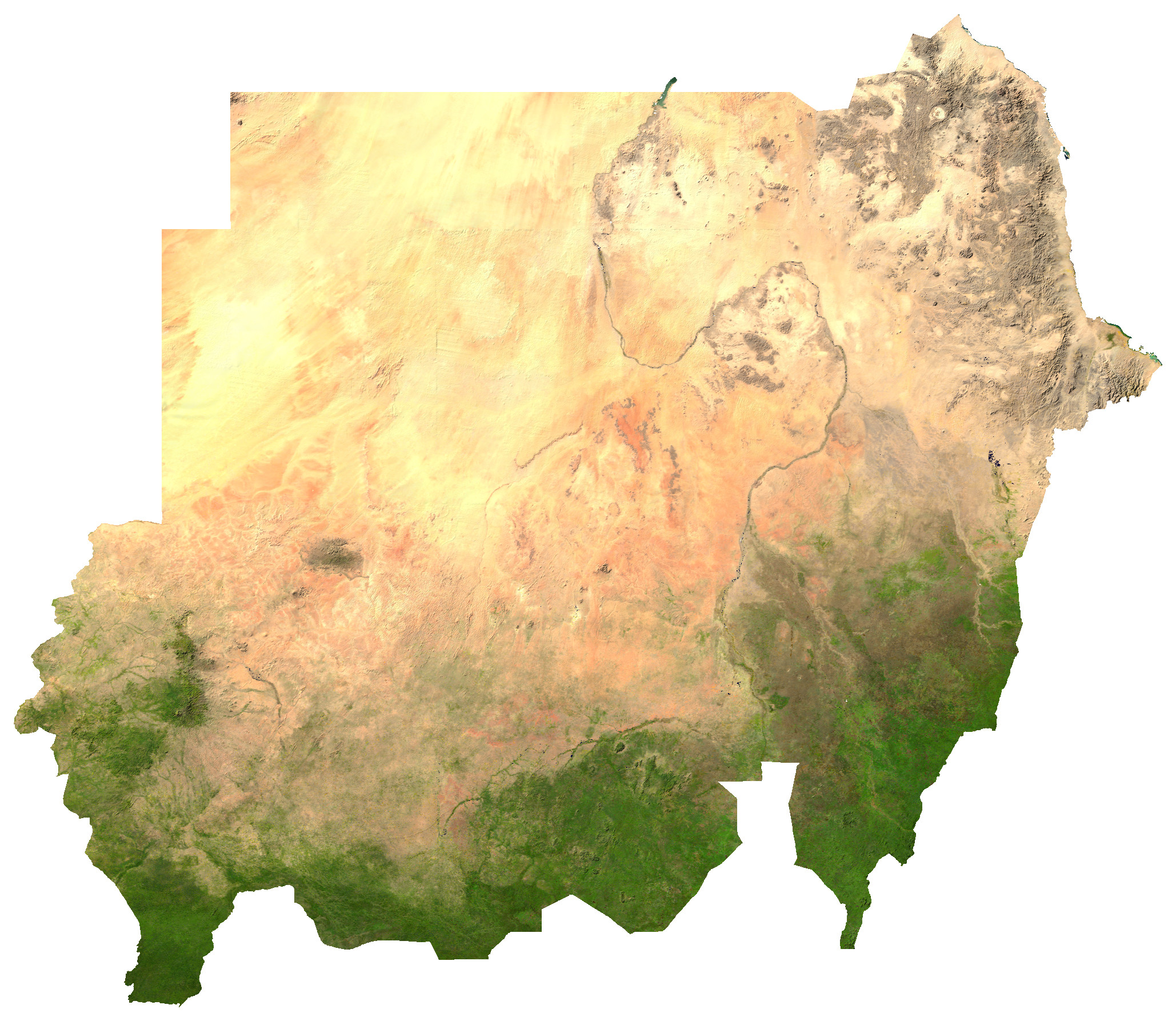
Satellite image of Sudan

Famine is shaped by generally two theories. The first is FAD, Food Availability Decline. This is the result of a drought, a war, or some other drastic change to the agricultural system. This is the natural cause for famine. The other theory deals primarily with the population’s ability to access or become entitled to food. In this case, food power makes itself known on a small scale, as opposing political forces in Sudan compete for the votes of the people by instigating or encouraging the famine.

For example, Sudan’s famine in the 1980s was completely intentional, and was only a pawn for a varied collection of different elites to improve their political and economic statuses. These political parties weren’t the only beneficiaries, though. Merchants were also known to hoard grain and buy livestock at inappropriately low prices when the famines shifted the terms of trade. Western Sudanese merchants during the famine of 1987 were described as heartless because they refused to sell grain to needy villages in Darfur at reasonable prices. Ergo, the Sudanese Famine was another example of food power in which food was and used as a policy, and which completely ignored the needs of the people and fostered the political and power-hungry intentions of opposite warring forces in the country.

The famine in Sudan in 1998 was a humanitarian disaster caused mainly by human rights abuses, as well as drought and the failure of the international community to react to the famine risk with adequate speed. The worst affected area was Bahr El Ghazal in southwestern Sudan. In this region over 70,000 people died during the famine.

== See also ==
- List of countries by real population density based on food growing capacity
