= National Renewable Energy Action Plan =

A National Renewable Energy Action Plan (NREAP) is a detailed report submitted by countries outlining commitments and initiatives to develop renewable energy that all member states of the European Union were obliged to notify to the European Commission by 30 June 2010. The plan provides a detailed road map of how the member state expects to reach its legally binding 2020 target for the share of renewable energy in their total energy consumption, as required by article 4 of the Renewable Energy Directive 2009/28/EC. In the plan, the member state sets out sectoral targets, the technology mix they expect to use, the trajectory they will follow, and the measures and reforms they will undertake to overcome the barriers to developing renewable energy.

Each NREAP report provides details of the expected share of energy provided by renewable sources up to and including 2020. The overall target for EU countries is to use 20% of their energy use from renewable energy sources although targets for each country vary considerably. In addition targets are broken down further by energy use sector including transport, electricity and the heating and cooling sectors.

== National targets for renewable energy sources ==
The overall EU target for renewable energy use is 20% by the year 2020. Targets for renewable energy in each country vary from a minimum of 10% in Malta to 72% of total energy use in Iceland.

National overall targets for the share of energy from renewable sources in gross final consumption of energy in 2020
National overall targets	2005 share	2020 target
Austria	23.3%	34%
Belgium	2.2%	13%
Bulgaria	9.4%	16%
Cyprus	2.9%	13%
Czech Republic	6.1%	13%
Denmark	17.0%	30%
Estonia	18.0%	25%
Finland	28.5%	38%
France	10.3%	23%
Germany	5.8%	18%
Greece	6.9%	18%
Hungary	4.3%	13%
Iceland *	63.4%	72%
Ireland	3.1%	16%
Italy	5.2%	17%
Latvia	32.6%	40%
Lithuania	15.0%	23%
Luxembourg	0.9%	11%
Malta	0.0%	10%
Netherlands	2.4%	14%
Norway *	60.1%	67.5%
Poland	7.2%	15%
Portugal	20.5%	31%
Romania	17.8%	24%
Slovak Republic	6.7%	14%
Slovenia	16.0%	25%
Spain	8.7%	20%
Sweden	39.8%	49%
United Kingdom	1.3%	15%
* Iceland and Norway have submitted Renewable Energy Action Plans to the EU Commission with 2020 targets and details of their development steps.

== Individual Renewable Energy Action plans (NREAP) ==
Each NREAP report provides a roadmap to development of renewable energy as well as details of the expected share of energy provided by renewable sources up to and including 2020. The overall target for EU countries is to use 20% of their energy use from renewable energy sources although targets within each country may vary considerably. In addition targets are broken down further by energy use sector including transport, electricity and the heating and cooling sectors.

- Finland National Renewable Energy Action Plan
- France National Renewable Energy Action Plan
- Germany National Renewable Energy Action Plan
- Italy National Renewable Energy Action Plan
- Poland National Renewable Energy Action Plan
- Sweden National Renewable Energy Action Plan
- United Kingdom National Renewable Energy Action Plan
- Complete list of National Renewable Energy Action Plans

== National Energy Efficiency Action Plans (NEEAP) and Annual Reports ==
In addition to NREAP and the associated progress reports, each country provides energy efficiency reports which provides further details of how each country will meet its energy efficiency objectives. These reports are submitted every three years with details of achievements on targets reported on an annual basis.

- German National Action Plan on Energy Efficiency
- Complete list of National Energy Efficiency Plans and Annual Reports.

== Progress Reports in the EU ==
The European Commission evaluated the National Action Plans, assessing their completeness and credibility. The Member States must adopt and publish, initially every five years, a report setting the indicative Member State targets for future RES-E consumption for the following ten years and showing what measures have or are to be taken to meet those targets. As of March 2012, ten of the member states were on track to surpass the national goal, and 12 others will meet their target. So far, only five participating member states have not met their goals. Iceland and Norway have also submitted NREAP reports outlining their 2020 targets.

Countries are also obliged to submit country progress reports every two years detailing the progress they have made towards meeting their long term action plans. These provide a detailed breakdown of the development of renewable energy by sector and represents actual results as opposed to targets contained in the action plans. The reports provide useful information on country achievements in renewable energy use by sector. In addition the European Commission can compile an overview of the overall EU wide target and report on progress as in its 2015 report.

- Complete list of Progress Reports
- EU commission 2015 Renewable Energy Report

== See also ==
- EU Renewable energy directive
- European Union directive
- EU Energy efficiency directive
