= Renewable energy in the European Union =

Share of renewable energy in gross final energy consumption in selected European countries: 10–20% 20–30% / 30–40% 40–50% / 50–60% >60%

Renewable energy progress in the European Union (EU) is driven by the European Commission's 2023 revision of the Renewable Energy Directive, which raised the EU's binding renewable energy target for 2030 to at least 42.5%, up from the previous target of 32%. Effective since November 20, 2023, across all EU countries, this directive includes reducing greenhouse gas emissions by at least 55% by 2030 and achieving climate neutrality by 2050. The Energy 2020 strategy exceeded its goals, with the EU achieving a 22.1% share of renewable energy in 2020, surpassing the 20% target. Renewable energy and green energy are not synonymous; some renewable sources emit significant CO₂, whilst some low-carbon sources are not renewable.

The largest renewable energy category for Europe in 2023 was solid, liquid, and gaseous biomass, which comprised half of all renewable energy consumption that year. In particular, wood is the leading source of renewable energy in Europe, far ahead of solar and wind. In 2023, renewables provided 26.2% of total EU energy consumption in heating and cooling, marking an 11.7% increase since 2004. In electricity, renewables accounted for 45.3% of gross energy consumption, led by wind (38.5%) and hydro-power (28.2%), followed by solar (20.5%), solid biofuels (6.2%) and other renewable sources (6.6%). In transport, the share of renewable energy used reached 10.8%. Renewable electricity generation reached 50% of total EU electricity in the first half of 2024.

According to provisional Eurostat data, renewable energy accounted for 26.2% of the European Union's gross final energy consumption in 2025, up from 25.2% in 2024. Renewables also accounted for 49.9% of gross electricity consumption in 2025. Sweden recorded the highest share of renewable energy in gross final energy consumption (65.4%), followed by Finland (53.0%) and Denmark (48.2%). The lowest shares were recorded in Belgium (14.9%), Slovakia (16.3%) and Ireland (17.2%).

The renewable energy directive enacted in 2009 lays out a framework for individual member states to share the overall EU-wide 20% renewable energy target for 2020. Promoting the use of renewable energy sources is important both to the reduction of the EU's energy dependence and in meeting targets to combat global warming. The directive sets targets for each individual member state taking into account the different starting points and potentials. Targets for renewable energy use by 2020 among different member states varied from 10% to 49%. 26 EU member states met their national 2020 targets. The sole exception was France, which had aimed for 23% but only reached 19.1%.

raw data

chart page
History of the percentage-share of renewables on the gross final energy consumption in the European Union since 2004

== Policy ==
Share of renewable energy in gross final energy consumption in EU27 countries in 2025

View chart definition.
Gross electricity production in the EU27 in TWh:

The Maastricht Treaty signed in 1992 set an objective of promoting stable growth while protecting the environment. The Amsterdam Treaty of 1997 added the principle of sustainable development to the objectives of the EU. Since 1997, the EU has been working towards a renewable energy supply equivalent to 12% of the total EU's energy consumption by 2010.

The Johannesburg Summit in 2002 failed to introduce the radical changes targeted for ten years after the Rio Summit. No specific goals were set for the energy sector, which disappointed many countries. While the EU had proposed an annual increase in the use of renewable energy at a rate of 1.5% worldwide until 2010, Johannesburg's action plan did not recommend such a "substantial" increase, with no concrete goals nor dates being set. The EU was unwilling to accept this result and with other nations formed a group of "pioneer countries" that promised to establish ambitious national or even regional goals to achieve global targets. The Johannesburg Renewable Energy Coalition (JREC) has a total of more than 80 member countries; the EU members, Brazil, South Africa and New Zealand amongst them.

In the European Conference for Renewable Energy in Berlin in 2004, the EU defined ambitious goals of its own. The conclusion was that by 2020, the EU would seek to obtain 20% of its total energy consumption requirements with renewable energy sources. Up until that point, the EU had only set targets up to 2010, and this proposal was the first to represent the EU's commitment up to 2020.

=== Renewable energy directives and targets ===
In 2009, the Renewables Directive set binding targets for all EU Member States, such that the EU will reach a 20% share of energy from renewable sources by 2020 and a 10% share of renewable energy specifically in the transport sector. By 2014, the EU realized a 16% share of energy from renewable sources with nine member states already achieving their 2020 goals. By 2018, this had risen to 18% with twelve member states meeting their 2020 targets early.

Article 4 of the Renewables Directive required Member States to submit National Renewable Energy Action Plans by 30 June 2010. These plans, to be prepared in accordance with the template published by the commission, provide detailed roadmaps of how each Member State expects to reach its legally binding 2020 target for the share of renewable energy in their final energy consumption. Member States must set out the sectoral targets, the technology mix they expect to use, the trajectory they will follow, and the measures and reforms they will undertake to overcome the barriers to developing renewable energy. The plans are published by the EC upon receipt in the original language, allowing public scrutiny. The commission will evaluate them, assessing their completeness and credibility. In parallel, the plans will be translated into English. In addition, the Energy Research Centre of the Netherlands was contracted by the European Environment Agency to create an external database and quantitative report of the reports received so far.

In 2014, negotiations about EU energy and climate targets until 2030 were initiated. Whilst seven Central and Eastern European member states had already met their 2020 targets by 2016 (amongst the eleven EU wide), a small number of others are likely to attempt to slow down the transformation process. The key parts of the European renewable energy targets agreement set in 2014 are as proposed by a Shell lobbyist in October 2011. Shell is the sixth biggest lobbyist in Brussels, spending between €4.25-4.5m a year lobbying the EU institutions. Agreement has no binding targets for member states on energy efficiency or renewable energy.

On 30 November 2016, the Commission presented a proposal for a revised Renewable Energy Directive to ensure that the target of at least 27% renewables in the final energy consumption in the EU by 2030 is met and to ensure that the EU is a global leader in renewable energy.

In April 2024, the Ember think tank released a report titled "Empowering Central and Eastern Europe." The report focuses on the progress and potential of renewable energy in Central and Eastern European (CEE) countries, with an emphasis on the Three Seas Initiative (3SI) participants. According to the report, renewable energy surpassed coal for the first time in 2023, accounting for 39% of electricity generation in Three Seas countries. The decreasing costs of wind and solar energy have made them the most cost-effective sources of electricity in the region. The updated National Energy and Climate Plans (NECPs) demonstrate heightened ambition, with some countries having already achieved their 2030 renewable electricity targets. The analysis presented in the report suggests that the 3SI countries have the capacity to deploy 200 GW of solar, 60 GW of onshore wind, and 23 GW of offshore wind by 2030, potentially raising the renewable energy share in electricity generation to 67%. Nonetheless, the report acknowledges challenges, including inadequate progress in offshore wind targets and a lack of policy support in specific regions. The report recommends measures such as prioritizing funding, implementing risk mitigation strategies, and enhancing cross-border infrastructure to maximize the CEE region's renewable energy potential.

By 2023, greentech was one of the few sectors in the EU where venture capital investments matched those in the United States, highlighting the impact of the EU's ambitious climate goals and government subsidies. This targeted investment has helped narrow the gap between the US and EU in sectors such as energy storage, the circular economy, and agricultural technology, and can be attributed to the European Green Deal and other government regulations.

=== Links to climate policy ===
Underlying many of the European Union's energy policy proposals is the goal to limit global temperature changes to no more than 2 °C above pre-industrial levels, of which 0.8 °C has already taken place and another 0.5–0.7 °C (for total warming of 1.3-1.5 °C) is already committed. 2 °C is usually seen as the upper temperature limit to avoid 'dangerous global warming'. However some scientists, such as Kevin Anderson, professor of energy and climate change in the School of Mechanical, Aeronautical and Civil Engineering at the University of Manchester and former director of the Tyndall Centre, the UK's leading academic climate change research organisation, have argued that to be consistent with the science, 1 °C is a more accurate threshold for "dangerous" climate change.

=== Initiatives ===
Specific EU renewable energy and energy efficiency initiatives includes:

- BUILD UP
- The Covenant of Mayors is a cooperative network of mayors and local authorities working to implement energy initiatives.
- Sustainable Energy Europe Campaign
- CONCERTO
- ManagEnergy
- Intelligent Energy – Europe (IEE)
- U4energy is an initiative funded under the IEE programme to improve energy consumption in schools and their local communities.
- Eco-innovation

== Member states ==
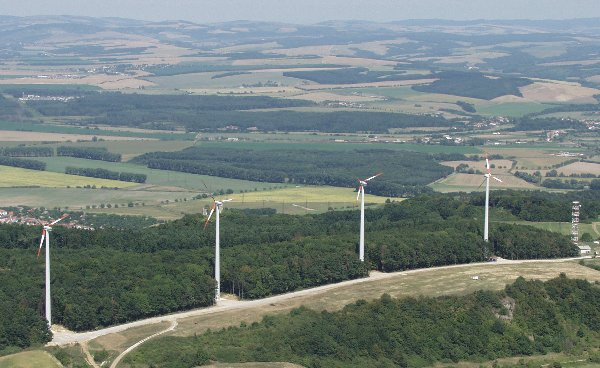
Wind power stations in Cerová, Slovakia

=== Croatia ===
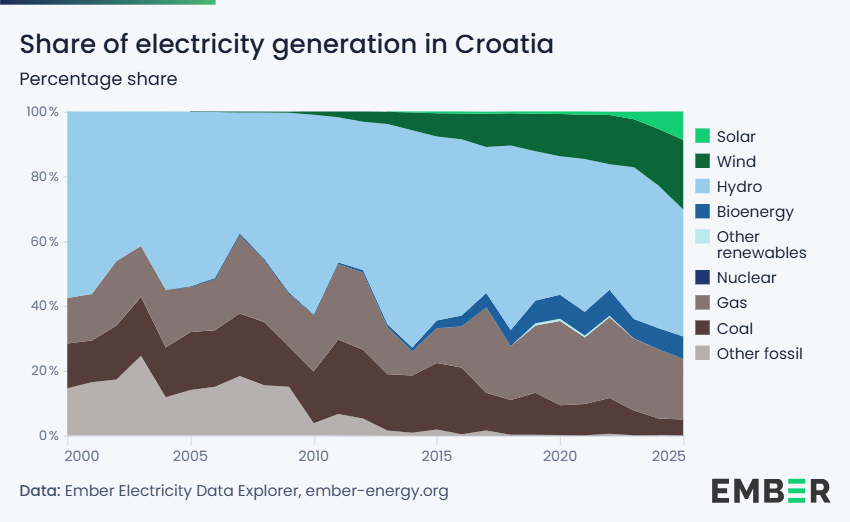
Share of electricity generation in Croatia - percentage share

One of the earliest Hydro-electric projects in the world and Europe's first Hydro electric power plant was built in Croatia near town of Šibenik in 1895, some 127 years ago, ever since Croatian energy strategy was based on Hydroelectric power generation, which today accounts for more than half of Croatia's power generation. Other sources of renewable energy in Croatia are Solar with 109MW of installed power in use and with further 350MW of solar generating power to be added to the grid in 2022 and 2023 with further 330MW to be added in 2024 and 2025. Croatia hopes to meet its 2030 renewable energy targets well ahead of schedule in 2025. with 109MW of Solar, 1400MW of Hydroelectric and 671MW Wind energy already commissioned, Croatia hopes to add further 1500MW of renewable energy to the power grid by or in 2025, increasing its Solar generation to 770MW, Hydroelectric to 1700MW and Wind to 1270MW. Croatia meets EU renewable energy targets, and is currently among the top 5 nations in the EU in terms of renewable energy target, with renewable energy accounting for the majority of energy power generation in the country. By 2023 Croatia hopes to install further 1500MW of Solar and Wind capacity, increasing the renewable energy share energy mix to over 80% of energy produced through renewable energy sources, reaching its 2050 renewable energy strategy 20 years ahead of schedule.

Croatia aims to reduce CO_{2} emissions by 45% by 2030 and phase out coal by 2033. However, the shift to a low-carbon economy will need significant expenditures in new energy infrastructure and additional renewable energy resources. Croatia established a 2030 National Energy and Climate Plan to attain its aim. The national policy targets for a 36.4% renewable energy share by 2030, as well as major investment in the energy industry, including hydropower, wind farms, solar photovoltaic facilities, and hydrogen energy.

Korlat is home to Croatia's largest wind farm, which consists of 18 wind turbines with a total installed capacity of 3.6 megawatts. The power station generates around 170 gigatonnes of electricity each year. That equates to around 1% of Croatia's yearly electricity use and energy for over 50 000 families. Five small solar photovoltaic facilities (totaling 22 megawatts) are being built in Croatia's southern counties of Split-Dalmatia, Zadar, Istria, and Primorje-Gorski Kotar – the projects initiated in 2022, backed by the European Investment Bank, are expected to save 66 kilotons of CO_{2} emissions per year and 28.8 gigatonnes of electricity per year.

=== France ===
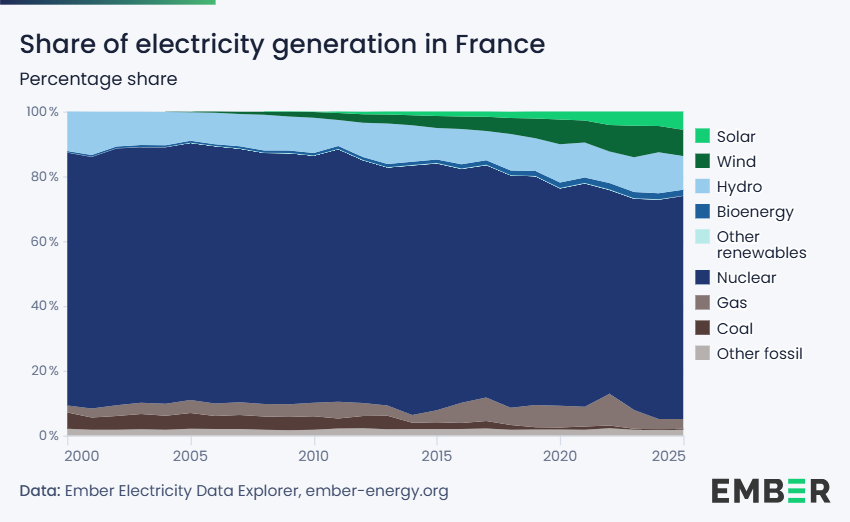
Electricity generation in France - percentage share

In July 2015, the French parliament passed a comprehensive energy and climate law that includes a mandatory renewable energy target requiring 40% of national electricity production to come from renewable sources by 2030.

In 2016, renewable electricity accounted for 19.6% of France's total domestic power consumption, of which 12.2% was provided by hydroelectricity, 4.3% by wind power, 1.7% by solar power and 1.4% by bio energy.

In 2023, France was able to be the second largest producer of renewable energy in the European Union after Germany.

=== Germany ===
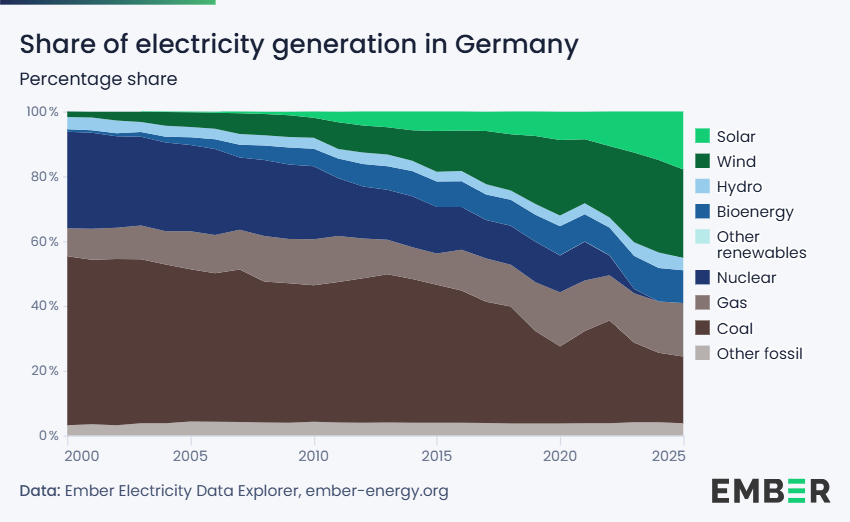
Electricity generation in Germany - percentage share

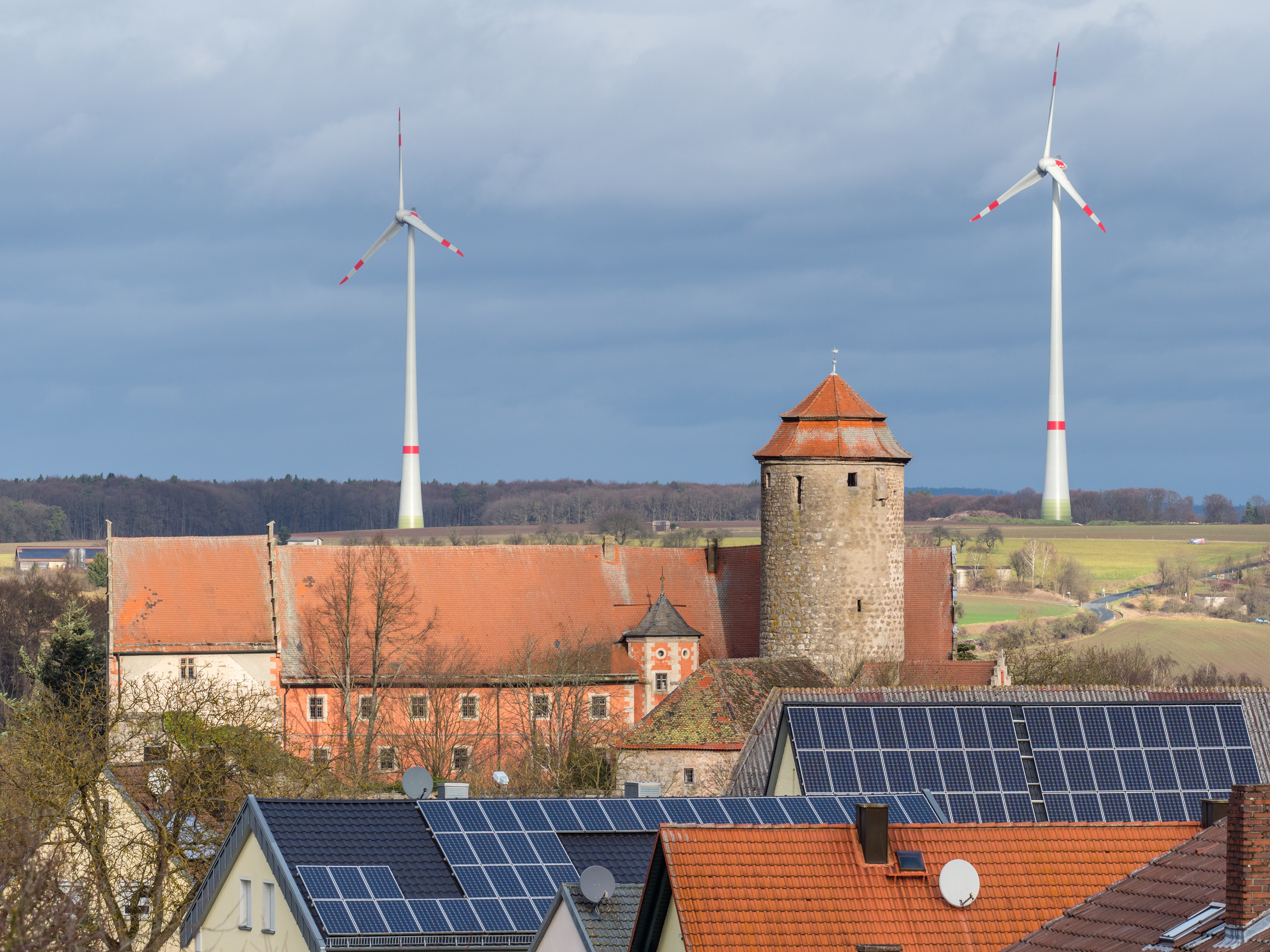
Wind turbines and solar panels at Lisberg Castle in Germany

In 2014, Germany's share of renewable energy in gross final energy consumption increased by 1.4% to 13.8%. In 2004, renewables accounted for only 5.8% or about the same share as for the Netherlands in 2014 (5.5%).

In 2016, net generated electricity from renewable sources accounted for about 33.9%. Compared to the previous year, biomass, solar and wind changed their production by +4.8%, -3.1% and -1.7%, respectively, while weather permitting hydro power decreased by 10.3%. Wind and solar combined generated more energy than nuclear in 2016 (see pie-chart). Nuclear decreased production by 7.7%, while electricity generation from natural gas, brown and hard coal changed by +50.2%, -3.3% and -5.8%, respectively.

In 2022, Germany was ranked among the top 10 renewable energy producing countries.

In April 2023, Germany shutdown its last three nuclear reactors, completely halting the production of nuclear power.

=== Italy ===
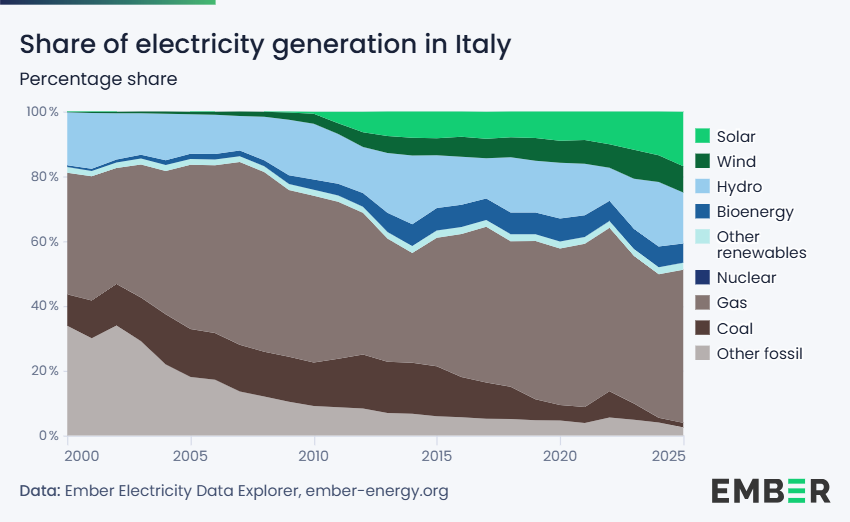
Electricity generation in Italy - percentage share

In 2014, 38.2% of Italian electric energy consumption came from renewable sources (in 2005 this value was 15.4%), covering 16.2% of the total energy consumption of the country (5.3% in 2005).

Solar energy production accounted for almost 9% of the total electric consumption in the country in 2014, making Italy the country with the highest contribution from solar energy in the world.

=== Lithuania ===
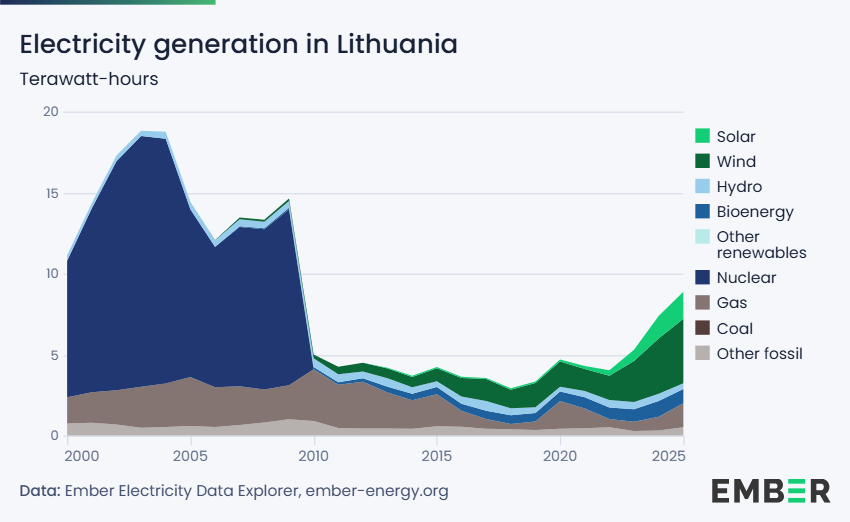
Electricity generation in Lithuania in terawatt-hours

In 2016 Renewable energy in Lithuania constituted 28% of the country's overall electricity generation. The majority of renewable energy in Lithuania is from biofuel. The principal source of electricity from renewable resources is from hydropower.

Lithuania has many yet undeveloped renewable energy sources, such as wind, solar, geothermal energy, municipal waste, and biomass. The amount of biomass per capita in Lithuania is one of the highest in the European Union and it is estimated that in 2020 Lithuania will be the first in the EU according to the quantity of available biomass for biofuel production. The projected production of biofuels by 2020 is 0.25 tons per capita.

=== Portugal ===
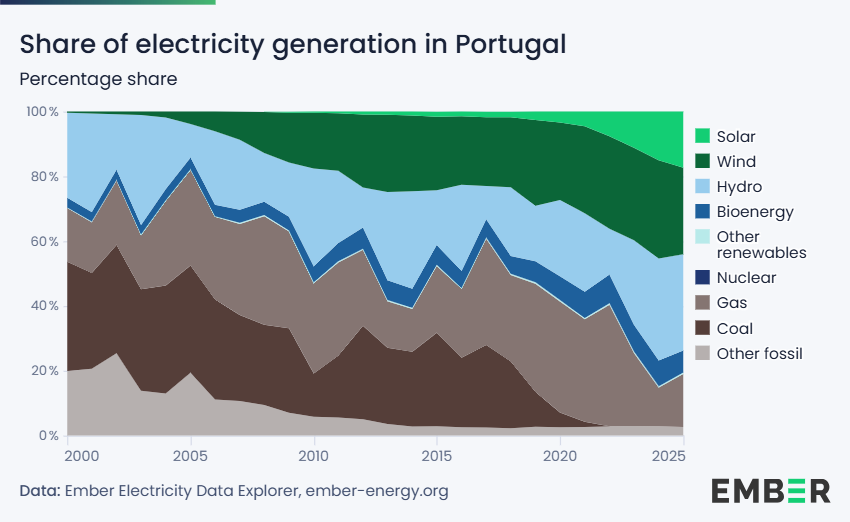
Electricity generation in Portugal - percentage share

In 2010, more than 50% of all yearly electricity consumption in Portugal was generated from renewable energy sources. The most important generation sources were hydroelectric (30%) and wind power (18%), with bioenergy (5%) and photovoltaic solar power (0.5%) accounting for the rest. In 2001, the Portuguese government launched a new energy policy instrument – the E4 Programme (Energy Efficiency and Endogenous Energies), consisting of a set of multiple, diversified measures aimed at promoting a consistent, integrated approach to energy supply and demand. By promoting energy efficiency and the use of endogenous (renewable) energy sources, the programme seeks to upgrade the competitiveness of the Portuguese economy and to modernize the country's social fabric, while simultaneously preserving the environment by reducing gas emissions, especially the CO_{2} responsible for climatic change. As a result, in the five years between 2005 and 2010, energy production from renewable sources increased 28%.

In January 2014, 91% of the monthly needed Portuguese electricity consumption was generated by renewable sources, although the real figure stands at 78%, as 14% was exported.

The renewable energy produced in Portugal fell from 55.5% of the total energy produced in 2016 to 41.8% in 2017, due to the drought of 2017, which severely affected the production of hydro electricity. The sources of the renewable energy that was produced in Portugal in 2017 were Wind power with 21.6% of the total (up from 20.7% in 2016), Hydro power with 13.3% (down from 28.1% in 2016), Bioenergy with 5.1% (same as in 2016), Solar power with 1.6% (up from 1.4% in 2016), Geothermal energy with 0.4% (up from 0.3% in 2016) and a small amount of Wave power in the Azores. 24% of the energy produced in the Azores is geothermal.

Portugal had the second largest photovoltaic power station in the world, which was completed in December 2008. The complex, called Amareleja photovoltaic power station, covers an area of 250-hectare. The 46-megawatt solar power plant produces enough electricity for 30,000 homes and saves more than 89,400 tons a year in greenhouse gas emissions. Also in production since January 2007, the Serpa solar power plant with an installed capacity 11MW, covers an area of 60-hectare, produces enough energy for 8,000 homes and saves more than 30,000 tons a year in greenhouse gas emissions. These solar parks are approximately 30 km apart.

In 1999, Central de Ondas do Pico, one of the first Wave power centers in the world, started to work in the Pico Island, in the Azores. It has a capacity of 400 KW.

=== Spain ===
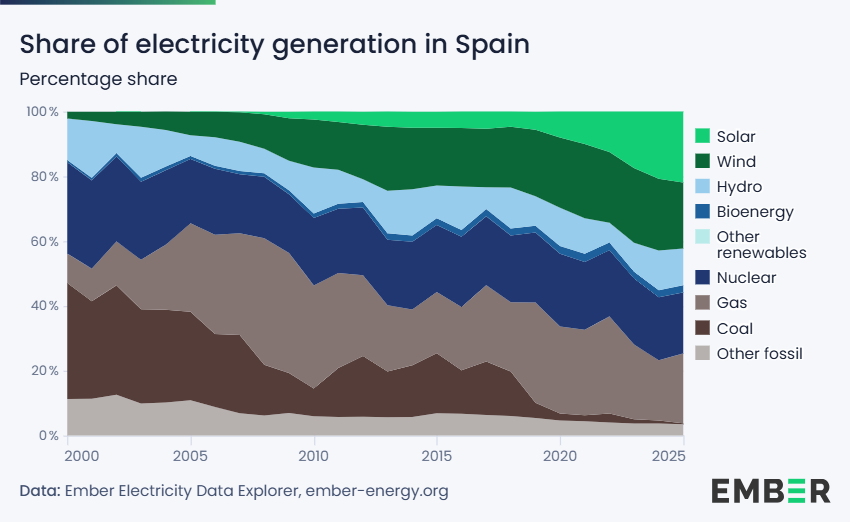
Electricity generation in Spain - percentage share

Spain as a whole has the target of generating 30% of its electricity needs from renewable energy sources by 2010, with half of that amount coming from wind power. In 2006, 20% of the total electricity demand was already produced with renewable energy sources, and in January 2009 the total electricity demand produced with renewable energy sources reached 34.8%.

Some regions of Spain lead Europe in the use of renewable energy technology and plan to reach 100% renewable energy generation in few years. Castilla y León and Galicia, in particular, are near this goal. In 2006 they fulfilled about 70% of their total electricity demand from renewable energy sources.

Through the use of nuclear power, two autonomous communities in Spain managed to fulfill their total 2006 electricity demand free of CO_{2} emissions: Extremadura and Castilla-La Mancha.

In 2005, Spain became the first country in the world to require the installation of photovoltaic electricity generation in new buildings, and the second in the world (after Israel) to require the installation of solar hot water systems.

== Energy Community countries ==
Also the Contracting Parties of the Energy Community, Albania, Bosnia and Herzegovina, Kosovo*, North Macedonia, Moldova, Montenegro, Serbia and Ukraine implement the Directive 2009/28/EC since September 2012. The shares for the Contracting Parties were calculated based on the EU methodology and reflect an equal level of ambition as the targets fixed for EU Member States. The targets for the share of renewable energy in Contracting Parties in 2020 are the following: Albania 38%, Bosnia and Herzegovina 40%, Kosovo* 25%, North Macedonia 28%, Moldova 17%, Montenegro 33%, Serbia 27% and Ukraine 11%. The deadline for transposing the Directive 2009/28/EC and the adoption of the National Renewable Energy Action Plan (NREAP) was set for 1 January 2014.

With the Decision 2012/03/MC-EnC and the acceptance of binding targets Contracting Parties can participate in all cooperation mechanisms. This means in particular that statistical transfers of renewable energy for the purposes of target achievement will be possible independently from physical flow of electricity. In addition, the decision lays down a number of adaptations to the rules for statistical transfers and joint support schemes between the Contracting Parties and EU Member States to ensure the original objectives of the RES Directive are preserved.

== Renewable energy sources ==
As a source of electric power in the EU, renewables overtook fossil fuels by 2020, and solar and wind together exceeded fossil fuels by 2025.

The share of electricity coming from renewable sources continues to vary widely among European nations. A few countries generate more electricity from renewables than is consumed in total.

=== Bioenergy ===
==== Biomass ====
Biomass is material from plants or animals such as wheat stalks, yard waste, corn cobs, manure, wood or sewage. In 2017, solid biomass was the main type of bioenergy in the EU, accounting for 70% of bioenergy production. In 2016, bioenergy was the leading source of renewable energy in the European Union, at 59.2% of gross energy consumption, most of which was used for heating and cooling (74.6%), followed by electricity generation (13.4%) and biofuels (12.0%). Biomass is burned both for heating and electrical generation, often in the form of pellet fuel. In many member States, wood was the single most important source of renewable energy, such as in Latvia (29%), Finland (24%), Sweden (20%), Lithuania (17%) and Denmark (15%). The European Union has established sustainability criteria for biomass to be counted towards renewable energy targets. The EU subsidises wood energy to incentivise its use over oil and natural gas, and consumes more wood pellets than any other world region.

Wood pellets are sourced from grinded trees extracted from forests in Scandinavia, Eastern Europe, the Baltic states and the southeastern United States. Some of the forests belong to natural protected areas such as the ones located in northern Romania. Although in Europe wood is considered a zero-emissions fuel and a renewable energy, this has been considered controversial and scientists have urged policy-makers to stop treating wood as a green source of energy in order to reduce the cutting down of trees.

For example, in 2018 hundreds of scientists wrote an open letter to the EU Parliament stating that “cutting down trees for bioenergy releases carbon that would otherwise stay locked up in forests, and diverting wood otherwise used for wood products will cause more cutting elsewhere to replace them.”

This critique has been echoed since, including in a peer reviewed study published in the scientific journal Nature in 2026, which contended that burning wood for power can be worse for the climate than burning gas. This was the case, the study found, even when the resulting carbon dioxide emissions are captured and stored.

==== Biofuel ====
Biofuels offer an alternative plant-based solution to rising problems regarding geological fuel sources. Chemically, biofuels are alcohols produced by fermenting raw materials from starch and sugars. While complete substitution is not yet common in Europe, countries like Germany have been using E10 fuel consisting of 10% ethanol since 2011. E10 fuels have replaced the previous E5 fuel, containing 5% ethanol.

Although this may seem like a slight increase in ethanol use, this progression reflects a more progressive Europe as improvements are being made based primarily upon environmentally conscious efforts, rather than geopolitical or economic pressures.

=== Geothermal ===
The earliest industrial exploitation began in 1827 with the use of geyser steam to extract boric acid from volcanic mud in Larderello, Italy.

According to the European Geothermal Energy Council (EGEC), which promotes geothermal energy, in 2025 the EU had an installed geothermal heat pump capacity of 36.3 GWth, 2.85 GWth of geothermal district heating and cooling capacity, and 1.02 GWe of geothermal electricity capacity.

=== Wind power ===
Share of wind power in total electricity demand in Europe in 2017 > 40% 20-30% 10-20% < 10%

Research from a wide variety of sources in various European countries shows that support for wind power is consistently about 80% among the general public.

Installed Wind power capacity in the European Union totalled 93,957 megawatts (MW) in 2011, enough to supply 6.3% of the EU's electricity. 9,616 MW of wind power was installed in 2011 alone, representing 21.4% of new power capacity. The EU wind industry has had an average annual growth of 15.6% over the last 17 years (1995-2011).

A 2009 European Environment Agency report, entitled Europe's onshore and offshore wind energy potential confirms wind energy could power Europe many times over. The report highlights wind power's potential in 2020 as three times greater than Europe's expected electricity demand, rising to a factor of seven by 2030. An EWEA report overviewing 2009 data estimated that 230 gigawatts (GW) of wind capacity will be installed in Europe by 2020, consisting of 190 GW onshore and 40 GW offshore. This would produce 14-17% of the EU's electricity, avoiding 333 million tonnes of CO_{2} per year and saving Europe €28 billion a year in avoided fuel costs.

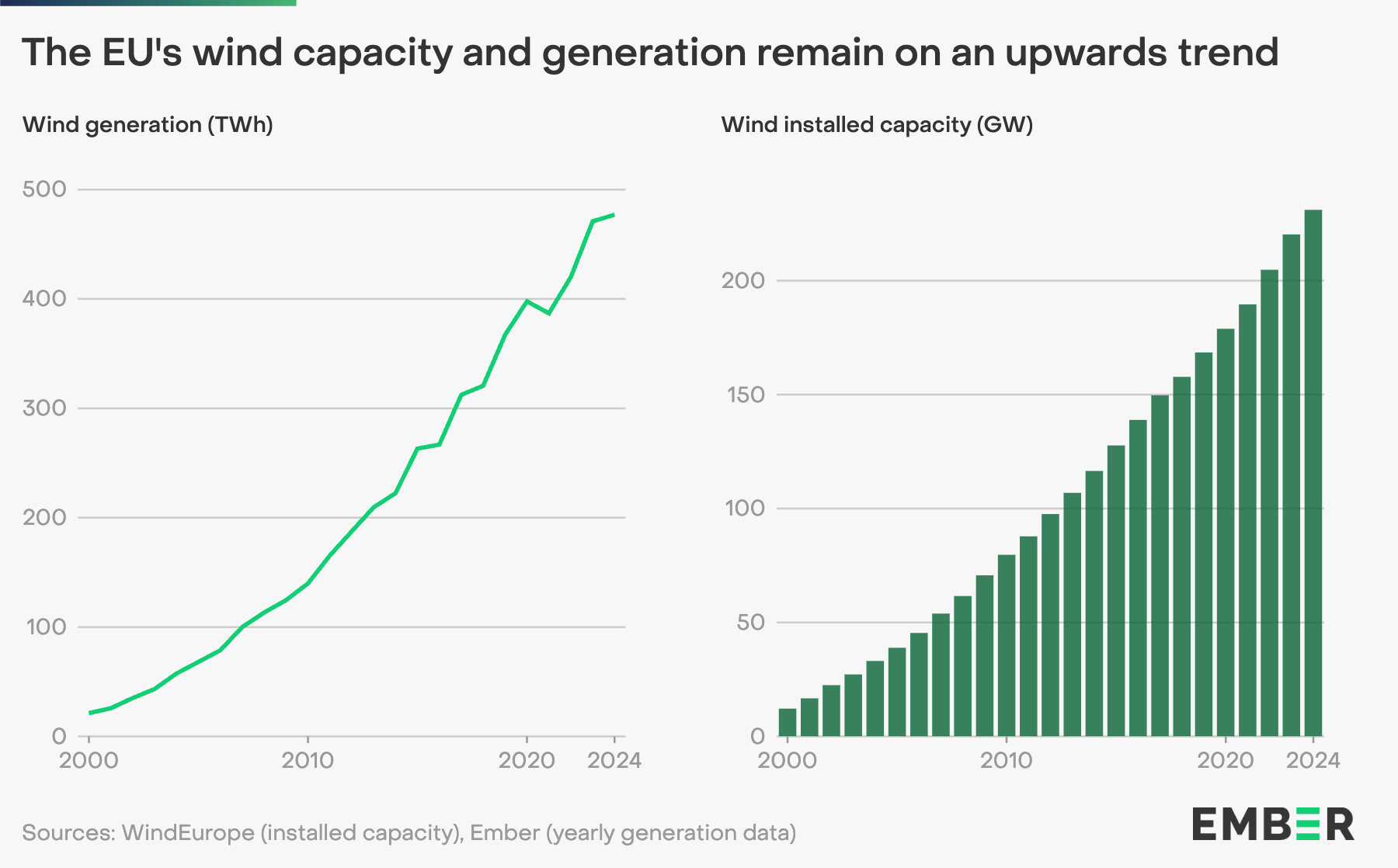
As of 2024, the EU's wind capacity and generation remain on an upwards trend.

In 2018 wind energy generated enough electricity to meet 14% of the EU's electricity demand. Denmark had the highest share of wind (41%) in Europe, followed by Ireland (28%) and Portugal (24%). Germany, Spain and the UK follow with 21%, 19% and 18% respectively. Out of the EU's total electricity consumption of 2,645 TWh in 2018, onshore wind contributed 309 TWh (12%) and offshore wind contributed 53 TWh (2%), bringing the total contribution of wind energy to 362 TWh (14%). The energy comes from a total onshore wind capacity of 160 GW and a total offshore wind capacity of 18.5 GW, with an average capacity factor of 24%.

=== Solar energy ===
European PV deployment in 'watts per capita' from 1992 to 2014: <0.1, n/a 0.1-1 1-10 10-50 / 50-100 100-150 150-200 200-300 / 300-450 450–600

==== Photovoltaic solar power ====
PV solar power are solar modules that are used to generate electricity.

2002, The world production of photovoltaic modules surpassed 550 MW, of which more than the 50% was produced in the EU. Within 15 years even a small country in Europe might expect to exceed this amount in domestic installations.

2004 79% of all European capacity was in Germany, where 794 MWp had been installed. The European Commission anticipated that Germany may have installed around 4,500 MWp by 2010.

2012 17.2 GW of PV capacity were connected to the grid in Europe, compared to 22.4 GW in 2011; Europe still accounted for the predominant share of the global PV market, with 55% of all new capacity in 2012.

==== Concentrated solar power ====
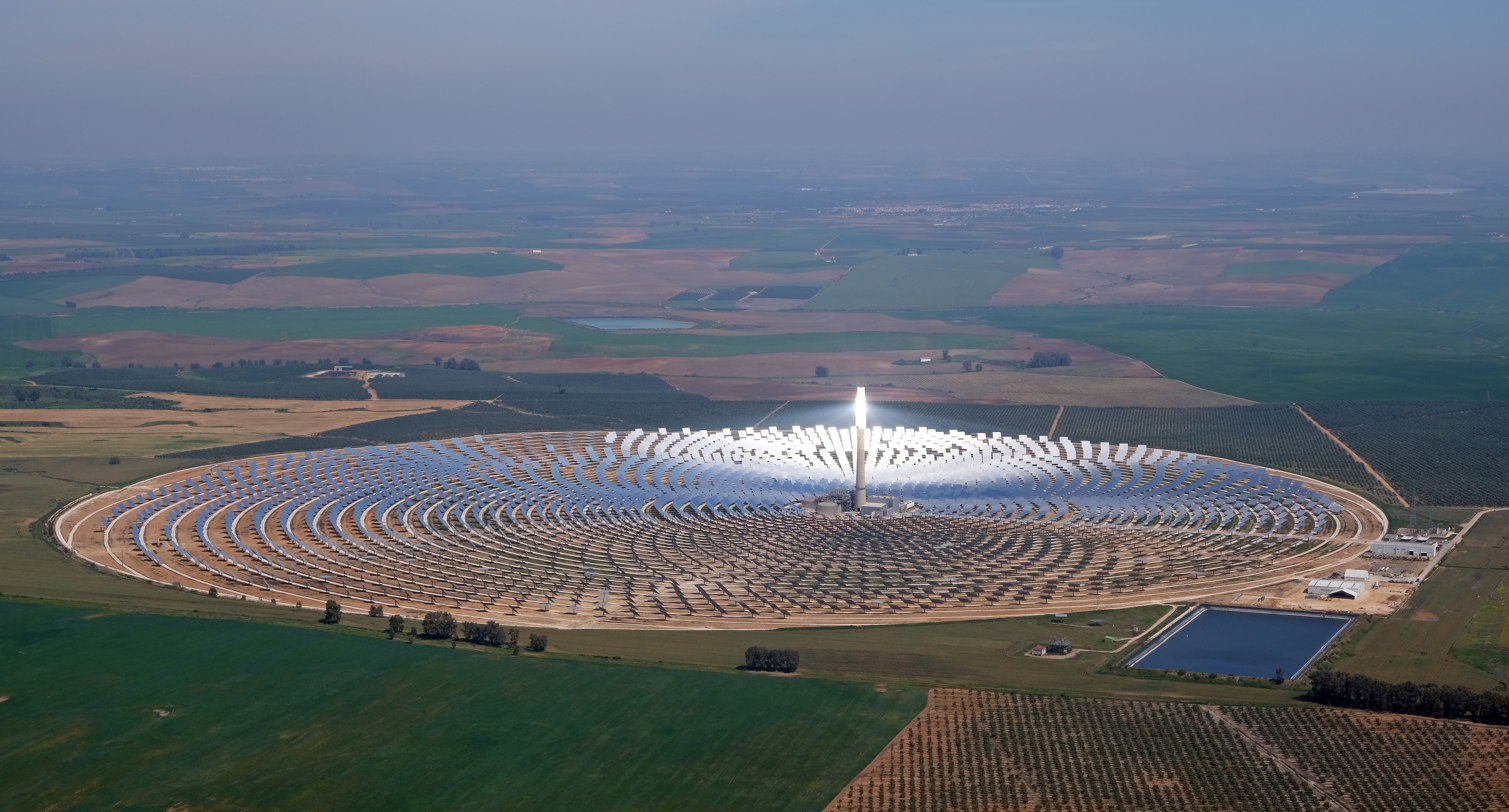
Gemasolar Thermosolar Plant, in Spain, was the first concentrated solar power plant to provide 24‑hour power.

CSV power can generate either heat or electricity according to the type used. One advantage of concentrated solar power (CSP) is the ability to include thermal energy storage to provide power up to 24 hours a day.

2012 By year end in the European Union, 2,114 MWp had been installed, mainly in Spain. Gemasolar, in Spain, was the first to provide 24‑hour power.

2015 The first commercial application of a new form of CSP called STEM will take place in Sicily . This has generated considerable academic and commercial interest internationally for off-grid applications to produce 24 hour industrial scale power for mining sites and remote communities in Italy, other parts of Europe, Australia, Asia, North Africa and Latin America. STEM uses fluidized silica sand as a thermal storage and heat transfer medium for CSP systems. It has been developed by Salerno-based Magaldi Industries.

==== Solar heating and cooling ====
Description: Solar heating is the usage of solar energy to provide space or water heating.

2016 At present the EU is second after China in the installations.

2010 If all EU countries used solar thermal as enthusiastically as the Austrians, the EU's installed capacity would already be 91 GWth (130 million m^{2} today, far beyond the target of 100 million m^{2} by 2010, set by the White Paper in 1997).

2008 The research efforts and infrastructure needed to supply 50% of the energy for space and water heating and cooling across Europe using solar thermal energy was set out under the aegis of the European Solar Thermal Technology Platform (ESTTP). Published in late December 2008, more than 100 experts developed the strategic research agenda (SRA), which includes a deployment roadmap showing the non-technological framework conditions that will enable this ambitious goal to be reached by 2050.

2007 ESTIF's minimum target is to produce solar heating equivalent to 5.600.000 tons of oil (by 2020). A more ambitious, but feasible, target is 73 million tons of oil per year (by 2020)

2005 Worldwide usage was 88 GW_{thermal} . Growth potential is enormous. Solar heating in the EU was equivalent to more than 686.000 tons of oil.

=== Wave power ===
Description: Wave power is used to generate electricity.

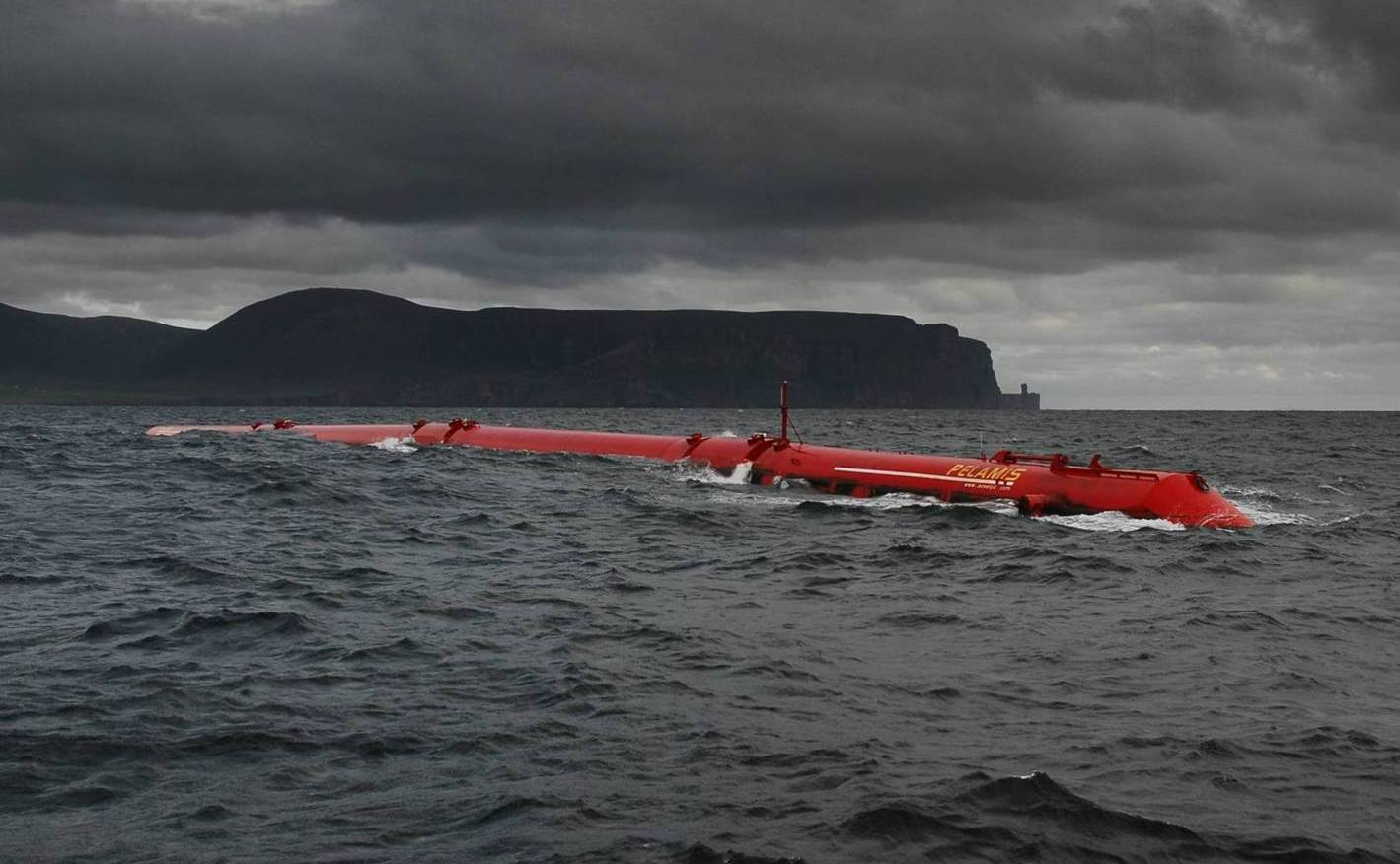
Pelamis wave energy converter

2008 The world's first commercial wave farm is located at the Aguçadoura Wave Farm near Póvoa de Varzim in Portugal. The farm which uses three Pelamis P-750 machines was officially opened in by the Portuguese minister for the economy.

2007 Funding for a wave farm in Scotland using four Pelamis machines was announced on 20 February by the Scottish Executive. The funding of just over £4 million is part of a £13 million funding package for marine power in Scotland. The farm, is to be located at the European Marine Test Centre (EMEC) off the coast of Orkney and will have an installed capacity of 3MW.

=== Hydrogen fuel ===
The Fuel Cells and Hydrogen Joint Undertaking, FCH JU, is a public private partnership supporting research, technological development and demonstration activities in fuel cell and hydrogen energy technologies in Europe. Its aim is to accelerate the market introduction of these technologies. The HyFLEET:CUTE is a project bringing together many partners from industry, government, academic and consulting organisations. It is intended that 47 hydrogen powered buses will operate in regular public transport service in 10 cities on three continents. Many of the HyFLEET:CUTE project partners have been involved in previous hydrogen transport projects, most notably the CUTE, ECTOS and STEP projects.

== Economics ==
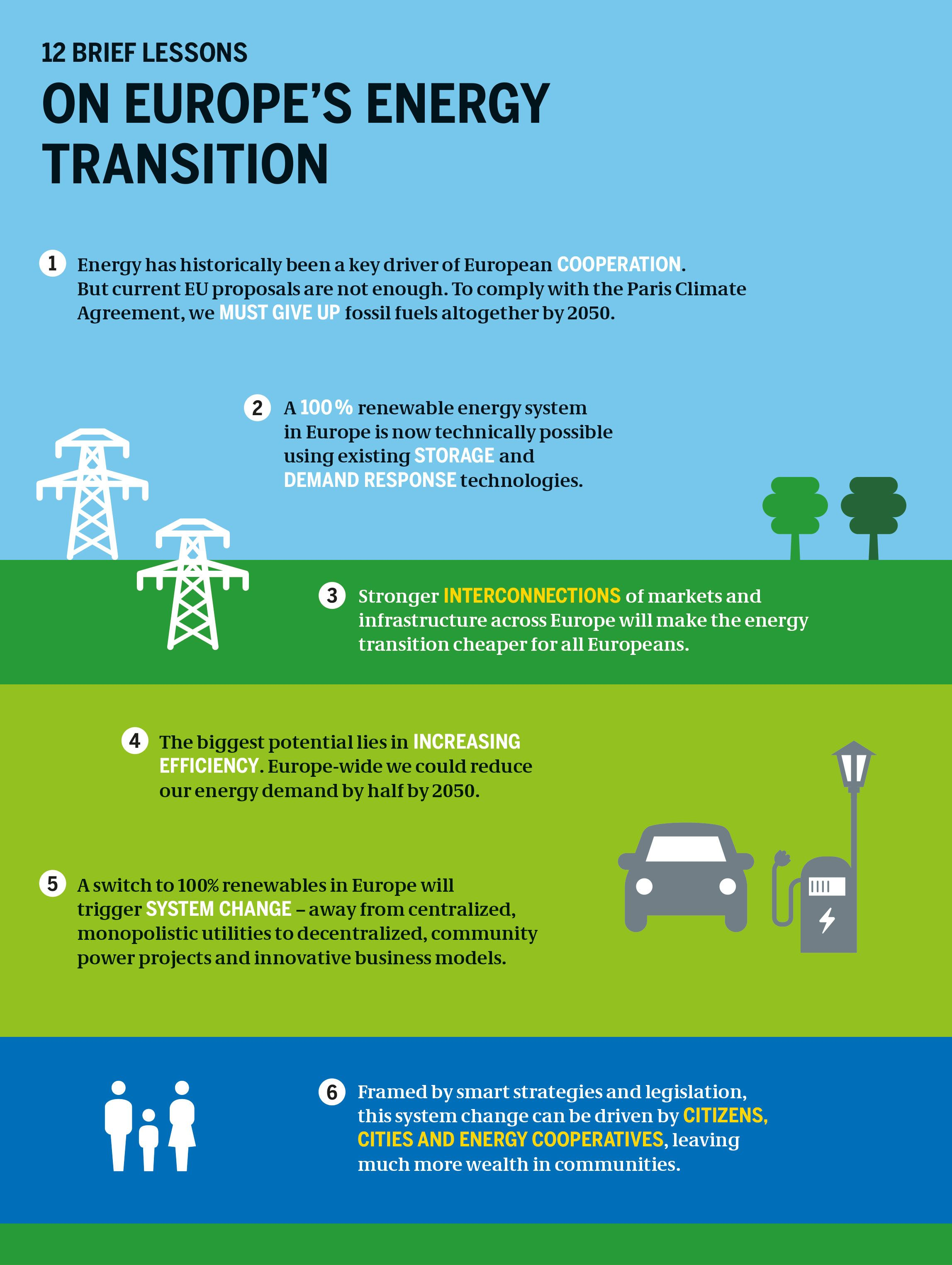
6 advantages of an energy transition in Europe - Energy Atlas 2018

=== Jobs ===
The renewable energy industry have offered new work opportunities in the EU during 2005–2009.

Jobs by the renewable energy industry in the EU
Year	Employees
2005	230,000
2006	300,000
2007	360,000
2008	400,000
2009	550,000

Employment in the renewable energy industry has however fallen every year since 2011, reaching 34,300 jobs in 2016, according to annual data from the International Renewable Energy Agency. IRENA says economic crises and adverse policy conditions led to reduced investments in renewable energy in the EU.

In 2012, the use of intermittent renewable energy caused, according to the German newspaper Der Spiegel, increasing electricity prices and grid instability induced power outages, created by renewable energy usage. It is also claimed by German heavy industry spokesmen that this has forced their industries to close, move overseas, and resulted in the loss of German heavy industry jobs.

=== Fuel costs ===
In 2010 renewables avoided €30bn in imported fuel costs. In 2010 EU supported renewable energy with €26bn.

== Statistics ==
In January 2026, Ember's European Electricity Review 2026 reported that in 2025, wind and solar energy provided 30% of EU electricity, surpassing fossil power (29%) for the first time, and generating more power than fossil sources in 14 of 27 EU countries.

=== Photovoltaics ===
As of the end of 2013, cumulative capacity of solar PV accounted for almost 79 gigawatts and generated more than 80 terawatt-hours in the European Union. Including non-EU countries, a total of 81.5 GW had been installed. Although Europe has lost its leadership in solar deployment, the continent still accounts for about 59 percent of global installed photovoltaics. Solar PV covered 3 percent of the electricity demand and 6 percent of the peak electricity demand in 2013. Grid-connected photovoltaic power systems account for more than 99 percent of the overall capacity, while stand-alone photovoltaic power system have become insignificant.

2013 - photovoltaic Barometer Report - PV Capacity in the European Union
Country	Added 2014 (MW)			Total 2014 (MW)				Generation 2014	
Country	off- grid	on- grid	Capacity	off- grid	on- grid	Capacity	Watt per capita	in GWh	in %
Austria	–	140.0	140.0	4.5	766.0	770.5	90.6	766.0	–
Belgium	–	65.2	65.2	0.1	3,105.2	3,105.3	277.2	2,768.0	–
Bulgaria	–	1.3	1.3	0.7	1,019.7	1,019.8	140.8	1,244.5	–
Croatia	0.2	14.0	14.2	0.7	33.5	34.2	8.1	35.3	–
Cyprus	0.2	29.7	30.0	1.1	63.6	44.8	75.5	104.0	–
Czech Republic	–	–	–	0.4	2,060.6	2,061.0	196.1	2,121.7	–
Denmark	0.1	29.0	29.1	1.5	600.0	601.5	106.9	557.0	–
Estonia	–	–	–	0.1	–	0.2	0.1	0.6	–
Finland	–	–	–	10.0	0.2	10.2	1.9	5.9	–
France	0.1	974.9	975.0	10.8	5,589.2	5,600.0	87.6	5,500.0	–
Germany	–	1,899.0	1,899.0	65.0	38,236.0	38,301.0	474.1	34,930.0	–
Greece	–	16.9	16.9	7.0	2,595.8	2,602.8	236.8	3,856.0	–
Hungary	0.1	3.2	3.3	0.7	37.5	38.2	3.9	26.8	–
Ireland	–	–	0.1	0.9	0.2	1.1	0.2	0.7	–
Italy	1.0	384.0	385.0	13.0	18,437.0	18,450.0	303.5	23,299.0	–
Latvia	–	–	–	–	1.5	1.5	0.8	n.a.	–
Lithuania	–	–	–	0.1	68.0	68.1	23.1	73.0	–
Luxembourg	–	15.0	15.0	–	110.0	110.0	200.1	120.0	–
Malta	–	26.0	26.0	–	54.2	54.2	127.5	57.8	–
Netherlands	–	361.0	361.0	5.0	1,095.0	1,100.0	65.4	800.0	–
Poland	0.5	19.7	20.2	2.9	21.5	24.4	0.6	19.2	–
Portugal	1.2	115.0	116.2	5.0	414.0	419.0	40.2	631.0	–
Romania	–	270.5	270.5	–	1,292.6	1,292.6	64.8	1,355.2	–
Slovakia	–	2.0	2.0	0.1	590.0	590.1	109.0	590.0	–
Slovenia	–	7.7	7.7	0.1	255.9	256.0	124.2	244.6	–
Spain	0.3	21.0	21.3	25.	4,761.8	4,787.3	102.9	8,211.0	–
Sweden	1.1	35.1	36.2	9.5	69.9	79.4	8.2	71.5	–
United Kingdom	–	2,448.0	2,448.0	2.3	5,228.0	5,230.3	81.3	3,931.0	–
European Union	4.9	6,878.4	6,883.3	167.1	86,506.8	86,673.9	171.5	91,319.8	–
Country	off- grid	on- grid	Capacity	off- grid	on- grid	Capacity	Watt per capita	in GWh	in %
Country	Added 2014 (MW)			Total 2014 (MW)				Generation 2014	

Source: EUROBSER'VER (Observatoire des énergies renouvelables) Photovoltaic Barometer - installations 2014

=== Solar heating ===
Solar heating in the European Union (MW_{thermal})
	2008	2009	2010	2011	2012	2013
(European Union) EU total	19.08	21.60	23.49	25.55	29.66	31.39

=== Biofuels ===
Biofuels
		Consumption 2005 (GWh)	Consumption 2006 (GWh)			Consumption 2007 (GWh)		
No	Country	Total	Total	Biodiesel	Bioethanol	Total	Biodiesel	Bioethanol
1	Germany*	21,703	40,417	29,447	3,544	46,552	34,395	3,408
2	France	4,874	8,574	6,855	1,719	16,680	13,506	3,174
3	Austria	920	3,878	3,878	0	4,524	4,270	254
4	Spain	1,583	1,961	629	1,332	4,341	3,031	1,310
5	United Kingdom	793	2,097	1,533	563	4,055	3,148	907
6	Sweden*	1,938	2,587	523	1,894	3,271	1,158	2,113
7	Portugal	2	818	818	0	1,847	1,847	0
8	Italy	2 059	1,732	1,732	0	1,621	1 621	0
9	Bulgaria		96	96	0	1,308	539	769
10	Poland	481	1 102	491	611	1,171	180	991
11	Belgium	0	10	10	0	1,061	1,061	0
12	Greece	32	540	540	0	940	940	0
13	Lithuania	97	226	162	64	612	477	135
14	Luxembourg	7	6	6	0	407	397	10
15	Czech Republic	33	226	213	13	382	380	2
16	Slovenia	58	50	48	2	160	151	9
17	Slovakia	110	153	149	4	154	n.a.	154
18	Hungary	28	139	4	136	107	0	107
19	Netherlands	0	371	172	179	101	n.a.	101
20	Ireland	9	36	8	13	97	27	54
21	Denmark	0	42	0	42	70	0	70
22	Latvia	34	29	17	12	20	0	20
23	Finland	0	0	10	0	10	n.a.	n.a.
24	Romania	–	32	32	0	n.a.	n.a.	n.a.
25	Malta	8	10	10	0	n.a.	n.a.	n.a.
26	Estonia	0	7	0	n.a.	n.a.	n.a.	n.a.
27	Cyprus	0	0	0	0	n.a.	n.a.	n.a.
27	EU	34,796	65,148	47,380	10,138	89,482	67,154	13,563
*Total includes vegetable oils in Germany: 7309 GWh (2006) and 2018 GWh (2005) and biogas in Sweden: 225 GWh (2006) and 160 GWh (2005), n.a. = not available

== See also ==
- List of renewable energy topics by country and territory
- Climate change in Europe
- Desertec
- Economy of the European Union
- EKOenergy ecolabel for energy
- Energy Cities
- Energy Community
- Energy efficiency in Europe (study)
- European Commissioner for Environment, Oceans and Fisheries
- Eugene Green Energy Standard
- Energy policy of the European Union
- European Renewable Energy Council
- European Pollutant Release and Transfer Register
- Fraunhofer Society
- Competitiveness and Innovation Framework Programme
- Renewable Energy Directive 2018
- REN21
- Transport in the European Union
- EurObserv'ER
