= United Kingdom National Renewable Energy Action Plan =

The United Kingdom National Renewable Energy Action Plan was the National Renewable Energy Action Plan (NREAP) for the United Kingdom in the 2010s. The plan was commissioned by the Directive 2009/28/EC which required Member States of the European Union to notify the European Commission with a road map for achieving legally binding renewable energy targets.

The report described how the United Kingdom planned to achieve its legally binding target of 15 per cent share of energy from renewable sources by 2020.

== Background ==
The history of energy production in the UK had been based on natural resources of fossil fuels; meaning that the UK had not been active in exploitation of renewable resources. Compared to many other EU Member States in the 2010s, the UK started from a very low level of renewable energy consumption.

In 2008, one year before Directive 2009/28/EC, the UK adopted the Climate Change Act 2008, mandating a minimum 80 per cent reduction in greenhouse gas emissions compared with 1990 levels, to be achieved by 2050.

== Efforts under the United Kingdom National Renewable Energy Action Plan ==
The National Renewable Energy Action Plan stated that the United Kingdom aimed to source 30 per cent of electricity used, 12 per cent of heating and 10 per cent of transport energy from renewable sources. In 2013, the Energy Act 2013 set decarbonisation targets for the power sector and in 2015, the UK government announced that all coal-fired power plants without carbon capture technology would be closed by 2025.

By the time of the Brexit referendum in 2016, the UK's Climate Change Committee was reporting that the UK would miss its 2020 targets in the plan; although the government insisted it was on target.

== Post Brexit ==
In 2016, The Guardian newspaper reported that the UK was still required to meet the Plan's commitments, despite the country voting to leave the European Union. However, European think tank Centre for European Policy Studies reported in early 2017 that the UK could revoke its commitments after invoking Article 50 of the EU treaty, and in 2018, the European Commission confirmed that the EU's Renewable Energy Directive would no longer apply to the UK after Brexit was formalized (which happened in 2020).

== See also ==
- Energy in the United Kingdom
