= Poland National Renewable Energy Action Plan =

The Poland National Renewable Energy Action Plan is the National Renewable Energy Action Plan (NREAP) for Poland. The plan was commissioned by the Directive 2009/28/EC which required Member States of the European Union to notify the European Commission with a road map. The report describes how Poland planned to achieve its legally binding target of a 15% share of energy from renewable sources in gross final consumption of energy by 2020.

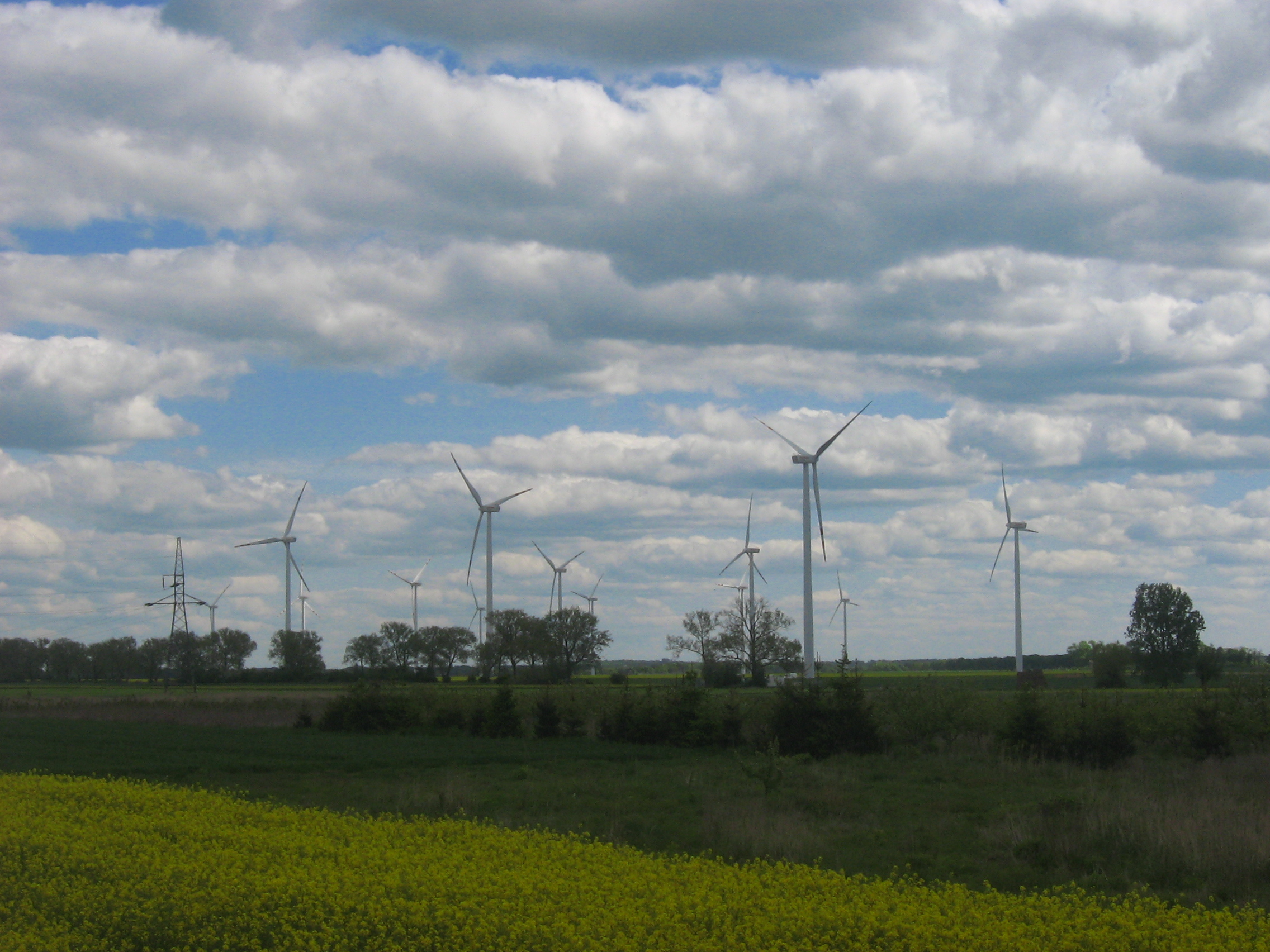
Renewable energy in the EU28. Wind farm in Ostrowo, Poland

== Main targets in Poland ==
Poland national target for the share of renewable sources in gross final consumption of energy in 2020 is 15%. The expected total energy consumption in 2020 is 69,200 ktoe and hence the amount of energy from renewable sources in target year 2020 should be 10,380.5 ktoe. National Renewable Energy Action Plan sets a target of the share of renewable energies to be 19.13% in electricity sector, 17.05% in heating/cooling sector and 10.14% in transport sector by 2020.

== Main incentives and laws in Poland ==
a) Based on the Energy Act and secondary legislation to this Act, inter alia:

- Obligation to purchase energy from RES imposed ex officio on sellers of electricity, who issued conditions of connections to the grid for a given source
- Obligation of energy grid operators to ensure priority to all entities in the provision of services involving transmission or distribution of electricity produced from renewable energy sources
- Reduction of the fee for connection to the grid, determined based on actual outlays incurred for installing the connection for renewable energy sources with total installed power not exceeding 5 MW and cogeneration units with power not exceeding 1 MW
- Special principles of wind farm balancing
- Additional support to small RES (below 5 MW) producing electricity (for instance: exemption from stamp duty for issuing the licence and certificates of origin).

b) Based on other legislation:

- Exemption of energy produced from renewable sources from excise duty that currently equals PLN 20 per 1 MWh

c) Financial support to investments in RES provided in form of grants or borrowings and investment loans bearing low interest rate:

- From public funds, including EU funds within financing of Operational Programme: Infrastructure and Environment and Regional Operational Programmes
- From regional funds, including from the budget of the European Union, within the scope of support to investment projects pertaining to RES
- From funds of the National Fund for Environmental Protection and Water Management
- From funds of the Eco-Fund that provided co-financing for investments in solar, wind, biomass and biogas energy, and highly efficient co-generation in the years 2005–2009
- From resources of the European Economic Area, including the Norwegian Financial Mechanism that provided co-financing for, inter alia, projects increasing the use of renewable energy sources in the years 2004–2009.

== See also ==
- Renewables Directive
