= Germany National Renewable Energy Action Plan =

The German National Renewable Energy Action Plan is the National Renewable Energy Action Plan (NREAP) for Germany. The plan was commissioned under EU Renewable Energy Directive 2009/28/EC which required member states of the European Union to notify the European Commission with a road map. The report describes how Germany plans to achieve its legally binding target of an 18% share of energy from renewable sources in gross final consumption of energy by 2020.

== Main targets in Germany ==
In the National Action Plan, the federal government estimates the share of renewable energies in gross final energy consumption to be 19.6% in 2020. The share of renewable energies in the electricity sector will therefore amount to 38.6%, the share in the heating/cooling sector will be 15.5%, while in the transport sector it will be 13.2%.

== Main incentives and laws in Germany ==
Under the Renewable Energy Sources Act (EEG), sector-specific tariffs are set for electricity from renewable energies fed into the public supply grid. The amount of compensation follows the principle of cost-covering compensation and is based on the specific electricity production costs of the specific sectors. KfW's funding program Renewable Energy (Erneuerbare Energien) section Standard provides low-interest loans for investments in installations for electricity production in accordance with the EEG, cogeneration plants and for small heat production installations. In program section Premium low interest loans with repayment subsidies are granted for renewable energy heat produced in large installations. KfW funding programs for energy-efficient construction and renovation (CO_{2} building renovation program), which promote the development of renewable energies, are Energy efficient Construction (Energieeffizient Baue), Energy Efficient Renovation (Energieeffizient Sanieren) or Energy-efficient Renovation – Local Authorities (Energieeffizient Sanieren – Kommunen) and Social Investment - Building Refurbishment (Sozial Investieren- Energetische Gebäudesanierung). The Heat-and-power Cogeneration Act (KWKG) regulates the funding of old and new combined heat and power (CHP) plants and the development and construction of heating networks into which heat from CHP-plants is fed. Guidelines on the promotion of mini-CHP plants promote through investment grants the new construction of CHP - plants up to 50 kW_{el}. The Energy Tax Act (EnergieStG) provides tax relief for energy products used for combined heat and power production if the CHP plant has a monthly or annual efficiency of at least 70%. There is also a tax exemption for biogas which is combusted immediately after production or is used in a CHP plant.

== See also ==
- Energiewende in Germany
- German National Action Plan on Energy Efficiency
- German Renewable Energy Sources Act
- National Renewable Energy Action Plan
- Renewable energy in Germany
- Renewables Directive
