= Finland National Renewable Energy Action Plan =

The Finland National Renewable Energy Action Plan is the National Renewable Energy Action Plan (NREAP) for Finland. The plan was commissioned by the Directive 2009/28/EC which required Member States of the European Union to notify the European Commission with a road map. The report describes how Finland planned to achieve its legally binding target of a 38% share of energy from renewable sources in gross final consumption of energy by 2020.

== Main targets in Finland ==
The main outlines of the approach to increasing the use of renewable energy are set out in the Long-term Climate and Energy Strategy submitted as a report to the [Finnish Parliament] in November 2008 (VNS 6/2008 vp). On account of the general development of the economy and the structural change taking place in the forestry industry, the government supplemented these outlines in April 2010.

In 2020 it is estimated that 56 TWh will be available in fuels dependent on forestry industry production (residual lyes and industrial wood waste). The estimate is based on the production of 13.7 m tons of paper and board. It is estimated that in the same year renewable energy sources yielding 77 TWh will be the subject of policy measures, as against 37 TWh in 2005. Final energy consumption in 2020 is estimated at 327 TWh.

== Main incentives and laws in Finland ==
=== Wind power ===
According to the Climate and Energy Strategy, wind power production will rise to 6 TWh by 2020. In order to promote wind power, there are plans to introduce a market-based feed-in tariff scheme in 2011. Wind power plants which were not covered by the feed-in tariff scheme would continue to receive a fixed subsidy of €6.90 per megawatt-hour.

=== Wood chips and other energy from wood ===
The use of wood chips in CHP production and separate heat production will be increased to 13.5 million m3. The target for use of wood chips in the Climate and Energy Strategy was 12 million m3 in 2020. In order to increase the use of forest energy, a three-part aid package has been devised which will increase the competitiveness of forest energy to a level at which the required growth can happen. The support package to be presented comprises energy support for small-sized wood, a feed-in tariff to compensate for the difference in costs between wood chips and alternative fuels, and a feed-in tariff for small CHP plants.

=== Hydro power ===
Hydro power production is to be increased by around 0.5 TWh per year of average water flow, to 14 TWh in 2020. The Ministry of Employment and the Economy is drafting an amendment to the guidelines for granting support which will make it possible to grant support for plants of up to 10 MW, rather than the current maximum of 1 MW.

=== Small-scale use of wood ===
There are plans to increase the flexibility of demand on the electricity market by means of hourly metering. Hourly metering makes it possible to apply electricity tariffs which vary hour by hour. This provides incentives to use wood as a source of extra heating when the market price of electricity is high.

=== Heat pumps ===
Renewable energy production by heat pumps should be increased to 8 TWh by 2020. Measures to promote this are currently being prepared.

=== Transport biofuels ===
The use of transport biofuels is to be increased to 7 TWh by 2020. Promotion of the use biofuels would be based primarily on a distribution obligation incumbent on vendors of transport fuels. Use of biofuels will also be promoted by means of the tax reform which is being prepared.

=== Biogas ===
The use of biogas should be increased to 0.7 TWh by 2020. In order to promote CHP production using biogas (reactor plants) a market-based feed-in tariff scheme will be introduced. Use of landfill gas will be promoted using the energy subsidy.

=== Pellets ===
The target for use of pellets is 2 TWh in 2020. Measures to promote this are currently being prepared.

=== Recycled fuels ===
The target for recycled renewables is 2 TWh. The use of recycled fuels is subsidized by means of a fixed subsidy payable on the basis of electricity generation.

=== Solar energy ===
Support for solar heating and solar power generation systems will continue with the aid of the energy subsidy in accordance with current practice. In the case of one-family houses, solar heating systems are promoted through the tax system by granting an offset for the household.

== See also ==
- Energy in Finland
- Renewable energy in Finland
