= Sweden National Renewable Energy Action Plan =

The Sweden National Renewable Energy Action Plan is the National Renewable Energy Action Plan (NREAP) for Sweden. The plan was commissioned by the Directive 2009/28/EC which required Member States of the European Union to notify the European Commission with a road map. The report describes how Sweden planned to achieve its legally binding target of a 49% share of energy from renewable sources in gross final consumption of energy by 2020.

== Main targets in Sweden ==
In the initial NREAP, the Swedish Government estimated the share of renewable energies in gross final energy consumption to reach 50.2% in 2020. Sweden ultimately exceeded its European Union targets, achieving a 56.4% renewable energy share by 2019. During this transition, Sweden also closed its last coal-fired power plant in 2020, two years ahead of schedule. According to updated Eurostat data, Sweden has consistently led the European Union in green energy transition, with renewable sources accounting for 62.8% of its gross final energy consumption by 2024, largely driven by solid biomass, hydropower, and wind energy. Furthermore, in the electricity sector, renewables supplied 88.1% of Sweden's gross electricity consumption in 2024.Sweden also recorded the highest integration of renewables in the transport sector across the EU, with renewable energy making up 26.4% of its transport fuel consumption.

== Main incentives and laws in Sweden ==
The Swedish licensing and legislative system is so structured that the Swedish Parliament and the Government govern through laws and regulations that are applied by national authorities that autonomously interpret and implement these laws and regulations. At a national level, there are regional government authorities and county administrative boards that have the task of coordinating and implementing the targets and mandates stipulated by the national authorities.

Special for Wind Power

There are four wind power coordinators and a national network for wind power within the area of wind power. Furthermore, the Swedish Energy Agency has, on behalf of the Government, developed an Internet-based manual about wind power (Vindlov.se) for all of the information that is needed for licensing matters regarding wind power and information on most things from concept stage to the commissioning of the completed wind farm.

Special for Solar Power

Solar heating installations need to meet certain quality standards in order to benefit from solar heating funding.

Financial Support Systems in Sweden

- The Electricity certificate scheme
- Support for planning initiatives for wind power
- Governmental support for solar photovoltaic cells
- Aid for investment in solar energy
