= Directive 2001/77/EC =

European Union Directive for promoting renewable energy

- European Union directive
- Title: Directive 2001/77/EC of the European Parliament and of the Council of 27 September 2001 on the promotion of electricity produced from renewable energy sources in the internal electricity market
- Made by: European Parliament and Council
- Journal reference: L283, 27 October 2001, pp. 33–40

Other legislation
- Replaced by: Directive 2009/28/EC

Directive 2001/77/EC is a European Union Directive for promoting renewable energy use in electricity generation. It is popularly known as the RES Directive.

The directive, which took effect in October 2001, sets national indicative targets for renewable energy production from individual member states. As the name implies, the EU does not strictly enforce these targets. However, The European Commission monitors the progress of the member states of the European Union – and will, if necessary, propose mandatory targets for those who miss their goals.

These objectives contribute toward achieving the overall indicative EU targets, which are listed in the white paper on renewable sources of energy. Regulators want a 12% share of gross renewable domestic energy consumption by 2010 and a 20% share by 2020.

The directive was superseded by Directive 2009/28/EC, published on 23 April 2009.

== National targets ==
The following table lists the indicative targets for each of the 15 original member states, and for comparison the share of renewable electricity in 1997 as well.

Country	1997 share	2010 target
Belgium	1.1%	6%
Denmark	8.7%	29%
(Germany)	4.5%	12.5%
Greece	8.6%	20.1%
Spain	19.9%	29.4%
France	15%	21%
Ireland	3.6%	13.2%
Italy	16%	25%
Luxembourg	2.1%	5.7%
Netherlands	3.5%	9%
Austria	70%	78.1%
Portugal	38.5%	39%
Finland	24.7%	31.5%
Sweden	49.1%	60%
United Kingdom	1.7%	10.0%
European Community overall	13.9%	22%

== See also ==
- Energy policy of the European Union
