= Renewable Fuels Regulators Club =

The Renewable Fuels Regulators Club (or REFUREC) is a network of governmental institutions that offers a pan-European platform for discussion, information exchange and tackling cross-border issues relating to the renewable transport fuels market in the European Union and beyond.

REFUREC was initiated in 2009 by the Renewable Fuels Agency, a UK Government non-departmental public body, created by the Department for Transport to implement the Renewable Transport Fuel Obligation or RTFO.

== Function ==
The Renewable Fuels Regulators Club was established to help address consistent implementation and regulation of the renewable transport fuels market. By facilitating and fostering stronger working relations between counterparts working in the field throughout Europe, REFUREC aims to minimise the regulatory burden of the new rules, and to maximise the overall effectiveness of the Renewables Directive.

== Structure ==
REFUREC is an informal network, participation is voluntary and not binding. There are no membership fees involved. The network organises frequent formal workshops to share knowledge, ideas and strategies on how best to implement workable interpretations of renewable energy directives across respective borders.

In addition to formal meetings, REFUREC hosts topic-specific ad-hoc meetings, facilitates internal working groups with interested member state organisations participating, and coordinates pan-European information exchange in between the formal meetings.

The administrative part is provided by an informal, rotating secretariat:

- April 2011 - June 2012: Spanish Comisión Nacional de Energía (CNE)
- July 2012 - September 2013: Dutch Emissions Authority (Nederlandse Emissieautoriteit, Netherlands)
- October 2013 - September 2015: Swedish Energy Agency (Energimyndigheten)
- October 2015 - September 2017: Finnish Energy Authority (Energiavirasto)
- October 2017 - September 2019: National Energy Authority Iceland (Orkustofnun)
- October 2019 - September 2021: National Oil Reserves Agency Ireland (NORA)
- October 2021 - September 2023: Danish Energy Agency (Energistyrelsen)
- October 2023 - September 2025: Dutch Emissions Authority (Nederlandse Emissieautoriteit, Netherlands)

== Meetings ==
The inaugural meeting was held on 4 February 2010 in London, and was attended by representatives from the UK, Denmark, France, Germany, Hungary, the Netherlands, Portugal, the Republic of Ireland, the Slovak Republic, Spain, Sweden, and the European Commission. To date, 30 workshops have been held all over Europe.

EU Member States meeting in Madrid, Spain

== Member organisations ==
Since its kick-off meeting in 2009, membership has grown rapidly and currently organisations from 31 countries are participating. REFUREC has matured into a successful network of renewable energy sustainability regulators, and into a positive model of Pan-European co-operation.
