= Energy in Sweden =

Historical energy consumption in Sweden by source. Renewables and nuclear is given as the electricity produced.

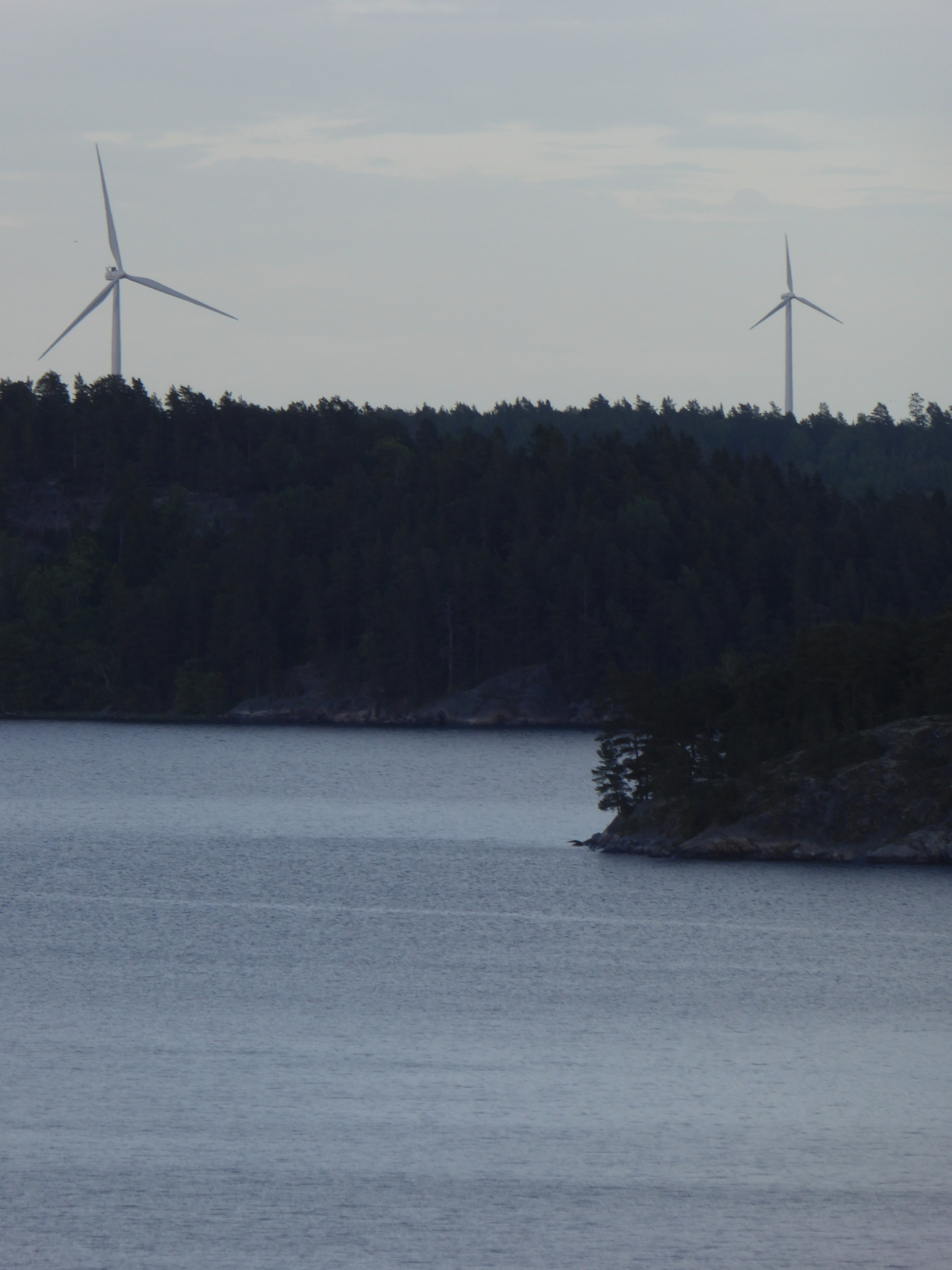
Wind turbines in Sweden

Energy in Sweden is characterized by relatively high per capita production and consumption, and a reliance on imports for fossil fuel supplies.

With 98% of electricity generation coming from renewables and nuclear in 2023, the electric grid is nearing zero emissions. Sweden is also a major net exporter of electricity, exporting over 20% of national electricity generation to the rest of Europe in 2023.

A high carbon tax on heating fuels has contributed to a noticeable uptake in biomass and electricity usage in the heating/cooling sector, with Eurostat reporting Sweden had the highest share of renewable energy for heating and cooling in the EU, at 69% (2022).

By contrast, the transport sector (especially plane fuel and automobiles) remain majority-powered by fossil fuels, a challenge for the government's 2045 target of carbon neutrality. Nevertheless, sustainability measures have reduced total emissions in Sweden, even as the population has increased; at 3.6 tonnes per person, Sweden's 2022 per capita Carbon dioxide (CO_{2}) emissions are 45% lower than 1990 levels and below the world average.

Eurostat data (2022) shows 66% of Sweden's total final energy consumption comes from renewables, broken down as 83.3% in electricity consumption, 69.4% in heating and cooling, and 29.2% in transport.

== Statistics ==
2020 energy statistics

Production capacities for electricity (billion kWh)
| Type | Amount |
|---|---|
| Hydro | 170.33 |
| Nuclear | 112.41 |
| Wind power | 65.54 |
| Biomass | 26.29 |
| Fossil fuel | 3.81 |
| Solar | 2.67 |
| Total | 336.04 |

Electricity (billion kWh)
| Category | Amount |
|---|---|
| Consumption | 124.61 |
| Production | 160.04 |
| Import | 11.83 |
| Export | 36.82 |

Natural Gas (billion m^{3})
| Consumption | 1.28 |
| Production | 1.31 |

Crude Oil (barrels per day)
| Consumption | 78,800,000 |
| Production | 107,970,000 |
| Import | 3,870,000 |
| Export | 147,170,000 |

CO_{2} emissions:
33.58 million tons

Energy in Sweden
| Year | Population (million) | Primary energy supply (Note: Primary energy supply is national production + net imports + supply for international aviation and shipping + stock changes. It includes energy losses, such as 2/3 for nuclear power.) (TWh) | Energy production (TWh) | Net energy imports (TWh) | Electricity consumption (Note: Gross production + imports – exports – losses.) (TWh) | CO_{2}-emissions (Note: Exclude emissions from non-energy.) (Mt) |
|---|---|---|---|---|---|---|
| 2004 | 8.99 | 627 | 408 | 236 | 138.7 | 52.2 |
| 2007 | 9.15 | 586 | 391 | 221 | 139.4 | 46.2 |
| 2008 | 9.26 | 577 | 387 | 229 | 137.1 | 45.9 |
| 2009 | 9.30 | 528 | 353 | 207 | 131.5 | 41.7 |
| 2010 | 9.38 | 596 | 390 | 229 | 140.1 | 47.6 |
| 2012 | 9.45 | 570 | 378 | 219 | 132.6 | 44.9 |
| 2012R (Note: CO2 calculation criteria changed, numbers updated.) | 9.52 | 583 | 421 | 179 | 136.0 | 40.4 |
| 2013 | 9.60 | 573 | 408 | 193 | 133.2 | 37.5 |
| 2015 | 9.80 | 529 | 395 | 170 | 133.2 | 37.1 |
| 2017 | 10.1 | 572 | 419 | 165 | 136.7 | 37.6 |
| Change 2004-17 | 12.3% | -8.8% | 2.7% | -30.1% | -1.4% | -28% |
Energy figures converted from Mtoe using conversion factor 1 Mtoe = 11.63 TWh.

== Energy plan ==
Sweden's energy plan is to have 65% of energy produced by renewables by 2030 and 100% by 2040.

== Energy sources ==
=== Renewable energy ===
Years in which the last three renewable power levels achieved
| Achievement | Year | Achievement | Year | Achievement | Year |
|---|---|---|---|---|---|
| 45% | 2009 | 50% | 2015 | 55% | 2020 |

Renewable energy includes wind, solar, biomass and geothermal energy sources.

Within the context of the European Union's 2009 Renewables Directive, Sweden was working towards reaching a 49% share of renewable energy in gross final consumption of energy - electricity, heating/cooling, and transportation - by 2020. Eurostat reported that Sweden had already exceeded the Directive's 2020 target in 2014 reaching 52.6% of total final energy consumption provided by renewables, up from 38.7% in 2004. This makes Sweden the leading country within the EU-28 group in terms of renewable energy use by share, followed by Finland and Latvia at 38.7%, Austria at 33.1% and Denmark on 29.2%. The two other signatories of the directive, Iceland and Norway, remain ahead of Sweden at 77.1% and 69.2% respectively.

The 2014 52.6% overall share of final energy consumption in Sweden breaks down as renewable energy providing the following shares to each sector: 68.1% of the heating and cooling sector, 63.3% of the electricity sector and 19.2% of the transport sector.

The share of renewable electricity use is high in Sweden. Hydro, wind, and solar power together accounted for 49.8% of the electricity produced in the country in 2014. When measured against national electricity consumption, the share rises to 55.5%. Since 2003, Sweden has supported renewable energy in the electricity sector with a "green electricity certificate" obligation for retail power suppliers. As of 2015 the plan of the certificate system was to support 25 TWh of new renewable electricity generation by 2020.

In June 2016, the Swedish centre-left minority coalition government reached a cross-party energy deal with three opposition parties (the Moderate Party, Centre Party (Sweden), and Christian Democrats (Sweden)), with the agreement targeting 100% renewable electricity production by 2040.

In 2013 renewable energy investment was more than US$1 billion in Sweden.

==== Wind power ====
Historical electricity production by source

Wind power accounted for 10% of the electricity generated in Sweden in 2015, up from 5% in 2012 and 2.4% in 2010.

Sweden has wind power potential of 510 TWh/a at land and 46 TWh/a at sea. Consumption was 140 TWh of power in 2010.

In 2013 Sweden was second top country for wind power capacity per inhabitant in the world: 488 W per person, only surpassed by Denmark (863 W per person). In correlation one must note that Swedish use of energy per inhabitant is much higher than average in Europe.

==== Solar power ====
Cumulative solar PV capacity in Sweden reached 4.8 GW in 2024, up from 0.14 GW in 2016.

Solar power accounted for 2.1% of Sweden's electricity generation in 2024, up from less than 0.1% in 2010.

In 2023, Sweden's largest solar park was an 18MW facility in Skurup built by solar developer Alight AB, which produces energy for Martin & Servera. In September 2025 Hultsfred Solar Farm in Småland with 100 MWp started operation.

==== Wave power ====
Sweden has a wave power station outside Lysekil run by Uppsala University. The wave energy research group at Uppsala University study and develop all different aspects of wave energy, ranging from power systems and generators, to hydrodynamical modelling, and environmental impact of wave energy parks.

CorPower Ocean's C4 buoy is a 100-ton wave power system. It was the first to pass the strictest safety test. It is a teardrop-shaped buoy 9 m (30 ft) wide, 18 m (59 ft) tall, and weighs around 100 tonnes (110 tons). C4 is tethered to the bottom. WaveSprint is the phase-control system. It works like a spring that amplifies the ocean's swells. in calm water, it can triple the energy captured. During storms, the system lets the waves pass, allowing the buoy to survive swells up to 18.5 m (61 ft) undamaged.

=== Hydroelectric power ===
Hydroelectric power accounts for more than half of Sweden's electricity production. More than 1900 hydroelectric power stations operate across the country. Forty-five produce 100 MW and over, 17 produce 200 MW and over, and 5 produce 400 MW and over. The largest station, the Harsprånget hydroelectric power station, is located on the upper Lule River and has a maximum production capacity of 977 MW. The Lule River is also the most productive river, with almost 18% of the Swedish installed capacity. Almost all of the medium to large plants are located in northern Sweden.

=== Fossil fuels ===
Coal ceased to be used for electricity production in 2020.

Most of Sweden, including Stockholm have no piped natural gas.

=== Biofuels ===
Sweden aims for a fossil fuel free vehicle fleet by 2030.

Sweden published the sustainability criteria for biofuels (2011) which consider the areas with high biological values to be protected in respect to fuels production. The feedstock origin used for production of bioliquids in Sweden during 2011 was Sweden 49% The Netherlands 17% United States 17% Finland 6% Belgium 3% and other 8% (Brazil, Malaysia and Russia). Palm oil is often pointed out as a dirty feed-stock for biofuels. None of the Swedish companies used palm oil in 2011. The largest share of feedstock for bioliquids comes from the forest industry in the form of tall oil pitch, tall oil and methanol.

In 2013 the bus fleets in more than a dozen cities relied entirely on biomethane, local plants produced more than 60% of the total biomethane used in Swedish natural gas vehicles, and more filling stations were opened in 2012 and 2013. Göteborg Energi (Gothenburg Energy) has a 20 MW facility that gasifies forest residues and then converts the synthesis gases—hydrogen and carbon monoxide—into biomethane.

=== Thermal and nuclear ===
Nuclear is dominating in this sector. The other operational plants are, in almost all cases, fueled with renewable fuels. Oil plants are few and are either decommissioned or used as a reserve.

==== Nuclear power ====
More than 35% of the Swedish electricity is produced by 6 nuclear reactors, spread out on three power stations:

- Ringhals Nuclear Power Plant - 2 Pressurized Water Reactor, ~3,1 GW
- Oskarshamn Nuclear Power Plant - 1 BWR (The largest BWR reactor in the world by energy output), ~1,5 GW
- Forsmark Nuclear Power Plant - 3 BWRs, ~3,2 GW

Before 2005, there were 12 reactors, but two BWR reactors (~1,2 GW) at the Barsebäck nuclear power plant were decommissioned in 1999 and 2005, two BWR reactors at the Oskarshamn Nuclear Power Plant were decommissioned in 2015 and 2017 (~1,1 GW), one PWR reactor was decommissioned at the Ringhals Nuclear Power Plant in 2019. (~1,8 GW). On 31 December 2020 the R1 reactor was permanently shut down.

===== Decommissioning and waste storage =====
Sweden is preparing to dismantle and demolish six large nuclear power reactors on three sites in coming years. It is also working on plans to provide long-term storage of high-level waste.

The total cost of spent fuel storage and decommissioning is estimated at SEK147 billion (around €14 billion). About SEK53 billion (around €5 billion) has been spent to date. This excludes the costs of near-surface disposal facilities for very low-level waste at Ringhals, Oskarshamn, and Forsmark.

The majority of low- and intermediate-level waste will be disposed of in a shallow geological repository for short-lived waste at Forsmark. The country is also exploring the use of transmutation to reduce waste radiotoxicity, with little success.

== Policies to curb carbon emissions ==
Development of carbon dioxide emissions

According to Energy Information Administration the CO_{2} emissions from energy consumption of Sweden were in 2009 54.77 Mt, slightly below Finland 54.86 Mt, despite the difference in population. The emissions per capita were in Sweden 5.58 and in Finland 9.93 tonnes per capita in 2009.

=== Carbon tax ===
In January 1991, Sweden enacted a carbon tax of SEK 250 per 1000 kg ($40 at the time, or EUR 27 at current rates) on the use of oil, coal, natural gas, liquefied petroleum gas, petrol, and aviation fuel used in domestic travel. Industrial users paid half the rate (between 1993 and 1997, 25%), and preferred industries such as commercial horticulture, mining, manufacturing, and pulp and paper were exempted entirely. As a result, the tax only covers around 40% of Sweden's carbon emissions. The rate was raised to SEK 365 ($60) in 1997 and SEK 930 in 2007.

According to a 2019 study, the tax was instrumental in substantially reducing Sweden's carbon dioxide emissions. The tax is also credited by Swedish Society for Nature Conservation climate change expert Emma Lindberg and University of Lund Professor Thomas Johansson with spurring a significant move from hydrocarbon fuels to biomass. Lindberg said, "It was the one major reason that steered society towards climate-friendly solutions. It made polluting more expensive and focused people on finding energy-efficient solutions."

== See also ==
- Electricity sector in Sweden
- Wind power in Sweden
- Biofuel in Sweden
- Sweden National Renewable Energy Action Plan
- Nordic energy market
- Renewable energy in Norway
- Renewable energy in Finland
- Renewable energy in Denmark
- Renewable energy by country
- SYSAV waste-to-energy plant
