= France National Renewable Energy Action Plan =

The France National Renewable Energy Action Plan, aligned with EU Directive 2009/28/EC, outlines France's commitment to reaching specific renewable energy targets by 2020. This includes achieving a 23% share of energy from renewable sources in its gross final energy consumption, with sector-specific targets of 33% in heating and cooling, 27% in electricity, and 10.5% in transport. To meet these goals, France has implemented measures such as modifying administrative procedures, providing tax reliefs and grants, and investing in energy-efficient railway infrastructure. Additionally, under this directive, EU Member States are required to submit biennial progress reports on the use and promotion of renewable energy, evaluating their progress towards national objectives.

== Main incentives and laws in France ==
Grenelle de l’Environnement 1 (2007) and 2 (2010) are the basis for the action plan. France focuses on comprehensive improvement of energy efficiency and the use of all renewable energies will be increased. Each administrative division of the country has to compile a plan, SRACE (Schéma Régional du Climat, de l’Air et de L’Energie), with both qualitative and quantitative targets for the use of renewable energies. In addition, PPI (Programmation pluriannuelle des investissements de production d’electricité et de chaleur) is a plan to strengthen the energy sector and reach the targets set. One target in France is also to simplify the administrative processes and increase the amount of bidding processes related to renewable energies.

=== Wind energy ===
Each SRCAE (Schéma Régional du Climat, de l’Air et de L’Energie) include regional wind energy plan with potential locations for onshore and offshore production. Overall target for wind energy in France by 2020 is 25 000 MW (onshore 19 000 MW, offshore 6 000 MW).

National energy company EDF or other energy company is obliged to buy the produced wind power from the specific locations for wind power (ZDE).

Feed-in tariffs in France for wind power are following: (first 10 years) onshore €0,082 /kWh, offshore €0,13 /kWh (after 10 years) onshore 0,028 – €0,082 /kWh, offshore 0,03 – €0,13 /kWh.

=== Solar energy ===
Target for solar energy is 5% (5400 MW) of renewable energies by 2020

Solar energy tariffs are based on markets and the size of the system

Unique feature in France is to prefer integrated solar energy systems with higher tariffs

Fond Chaleur: fund for supporting heat production of renewable energies (solar thermal included)

=== Bioenergy ===
According to Grenelle 2, 50% of renewable energy targets will be achieved by biomass

Bidding processes

Feed-in tariffs for bioenergy (only over 5 MW CHP-plants): €0,045 /kWh for electricity, 0,08-€0,13 /kWh bonus according to efficiency and resource use of the plant. No tariff for produced heat

Fond Chaleur: fund for supporting heat production of renewable energies

== Key players in France ==
- The French Renewable Energies Association (SER)
- The French Solar Energy Association
- Ministry of Ecology, Sustainable Development, Transport and Housing
- French Environment and Energy Management Agency
- Regulatory Commission of Energy
- French Wind Energy Association (FEE)
- Windustry France
