= Renewable energy in Austria =

Installed grid interactive renewable power capacity in Austria as of 24 November 2021

- Wind power: 3,500 MW (19.0%)
- Solar power: 2,500 MW (13.6%)
- Biomass power: 482 MW (2.6%)
- Hydro power: 11,812 MW (64.2%)
- Energy from waste: 103 MW (0.6%)
Installed grid power capacity from all sources in Austria as of 24 November 2021

- Coal: 0 MW (0.0%)
- Other renewables: 6,482 MW (28.3%)
- Hydro power: 11,815 MW (51.6%)
- Gas: 4,350 MW (19.0%)
- Others (e.g. wasteburning): 103 MW (0.4%)
- Oil: 164 MW (0.7%)

Austria renewable electricity production by source

By the end of 2016, Austria already had fulfilled their EU Renewables Directive goal for the year 2020. By 2016, renewable energies accounted for 33.5% of the final energy consumption in all sectors (heat, electricity, mobility). The renewable energy sector was also accountable for hosting 41,591 jobs (full-time equivalent) and creating a revenue of 7,219 million euros in 2016.

87% of Austria's electricity generation was produced by renewable sources in 2023, the second highest in the EU. However, Austria ranks 6th in total renewable energy consumption (42.9% of gross final energy consumption), as total energy includes electricity, heating/cooling, and transport sectors. Despite this high renewable electricity share, Austria's CO2 emissions intensity was 59 grams per kWh, higher than France's 48 grams per kWh, which relies on nuclear energy as baseload. Austria's electricity mix includes 12% gas, explaining its higher emissions compared to Sweden's 8 grams per kWh - the EU's lowest - achieved through 70% of electricity from hydroelectric (41%) and nuclear (29%) sources.

== Government targets ==
The new Government of Austria set an ambitious goal in 2017. First of all, they planned to achieve 100% of renewable electricity by 2030 and secondly, proceed the decarbonization of the energy system by 2050. As of 2016, renewable energies account 71.7% in Austria. It is only possible to achieve this goal if the necessary organizational and economic framework conditions are also created in order to be able to continue to guarantee the security and the quality of supply. Overall, realistic goals should be defined, whose implementation and achievement can be underpinned by appropriate measures. It was calculated by the Austrian Energy Agency (AEA) that in order to achieve the target, the annual generation of electricity from renewable energy sources must be increased by up to 35 terawatt hours by 2030. Since hydropower in Austria is only possible to a limited extent, additional consumption must be covered by wind power and photovoltaic systems. This massive development of power generation from renewables, also requires a parallel large-scale expansion of electricity grids and in particular the storage capacity.

Decarbonization means a drastic reduction of carbon emissions and the replacement of fossil fuels by renewable energy sources. This will only be economically and technically possible through linking power, heat and mobility into an integrated energy system (sector coupling). It is not only important in the field of electricity, but also to find appropriate measures in the other sectors to achieve the ambitious goals.

== Government policy ==
The former coalition government consisting of ÖVP and FPÖ have given environment and energy an important role in the new government program 2017–2022. According to both parties an ambitious climate and energy strategy is needed to ensure that the target of 100% renewable electricity by 2030 will be reached.

Related to renewable energies there is a law called the Green Electricity Act. The Green Electricity Act regulates the promotion of power generation from wind power, photovoltaics (from 5 kWp), solid, liquid or gaseous biomass, landfill or sewage gas and geothermal energy with feed-in tariffs and hydropower (up to 20 MW) with investment support. Each year, a fixed quota is available for new contracted renewable energy plants; the level of feed-in tariffs is set by ordinance. Financing is provided by a pay-as-you-go system through end consumers.

In the field of energy and climate policy, Austria has committed itself to achieving various objectives. The most important and relevant to the ENERGY2050 strategy process are:

- Emission reduction in sectors which are not subject to emissions trading (e.g. households, services, commerce, transport) by 16% by 2020 compared to 2005.
- Increasing the share of renewable energies in gross final energy consumption from 23% (2005) to 34% by 2020. Biofuels have a share target of 10% in the transport sector.
- Reduction of final energy consumption by 9% compared to the trend until 2016.
- EU policy target to reduce greenhouse gas emissions by 80-95 % by 2050.

With regard to innovative energy-related technologies, Austria has the following strategic documents and plans:

- Energy Strategy Austria: Introduced in the spring of 2010 by the Ministry of Economic Affairs and the Ministry of Environment. It contains the energy strategy proposed measure to help implement the 20/20/20 target of the EU in Austria.
- Renewable Energy Action Plan: An action plan to achieve the 34% target. In essence, it is a concretization of the energy strategy. This goal was almost already achieved by the end of 2016 with and share of 33,5% renewable contributing to the consumption of final energy in Austria.
- Energy efficiency action plan: For the implementation of the EU Final Energy Efficiency Directive, each Member State had to submit a national action plan by mid-2007. It defines the savings target, the measures and tools to achieve it and needs to be evaluated and revised in 2011 and 2014.
- Energy and climate protection programs of the federal states and municipalities: Many cities and municipalities have formulated strategies with varying degrees of liability for their respective sphere of influence.

== Sources of renewable electricity generation ==
=== Hydroelectricity ===
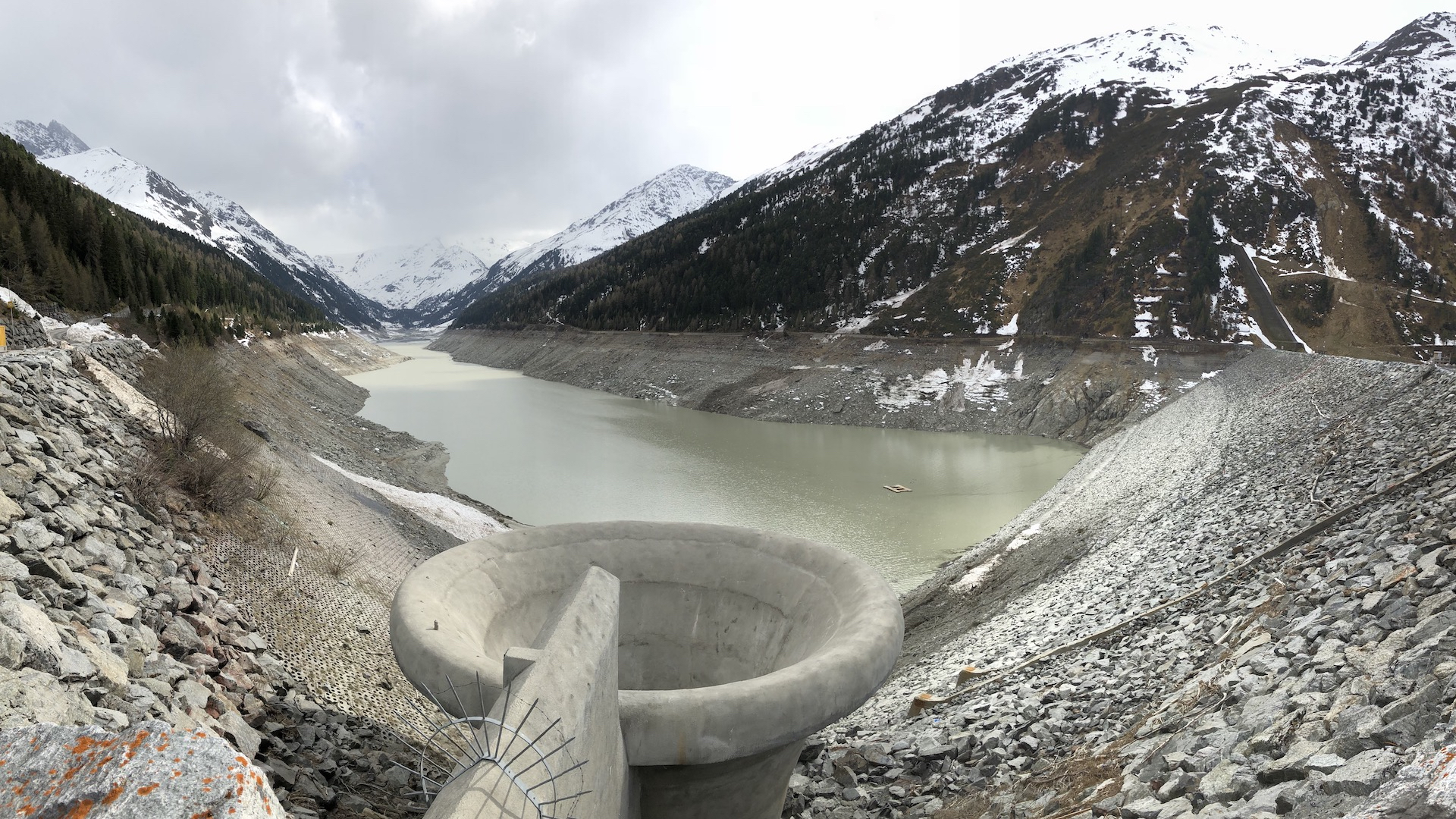
Hydro power plant "Gepatschspeicher" with a power of 395 MW in Tyrol

The use of hydropower in Austria has a long tradition. At the beginning of the 20th century, hydropower was mostly used for sawmills, mills and forging hammers. Today it is used to generate hydroelectricity.

Because of its mountainous terrain from being situated in the Alps, Austria has a large share of hydropower resources. The range of hydropower plants installed in Austria goes from small hydro plants with a few kilowatts up to big plants with several hundred megawatts. While the definition of small hydropower may differ by country, in the states of the European Union, small hydropower is up to 10 MW of installed power.

The share of hydropower generation in the Austrian electricity mix in 2017 was 43% from run-of-the-river hydropower plants and 21% from pumped-storage hydropower plants. Together, these two sources deliver 64% of Austria's electricity needs.

The field of green electricity has experienced a sustained upturn since 2003 thanks to the eco-electricity promotion system. This development will continue in 2017, and a gradual expansion of sustainable power generation will be realized. The share of electricity generated from hydropower increased thanks to this system. 148 large hydro power plants (>10 MW) were built from 2003 until 2016.

Over the next few years, growth will be dominated by the repowering of small hydropower plants of up to 10 MW. There are high potentials above all in the western Alpine federal states and along the Danube in Upper and Lower Austria. The potential of large hydropower plants has been largely exhausted. In the Austrian hydropower industry, there were 6784 employees in 2016. The Austrian hydropower industry generated 2 billion euros in 2016.

Due to the longevity of hydropower plants and the increased penetration of intermittent renewable energy resources, such as solar and wind, in the European electricity system, there is potential for cross-border trade of electricity to convert excess intermittent renewable electricity into potential energy for later use via pumped-storage hydropower plants.

=== Wind power ===
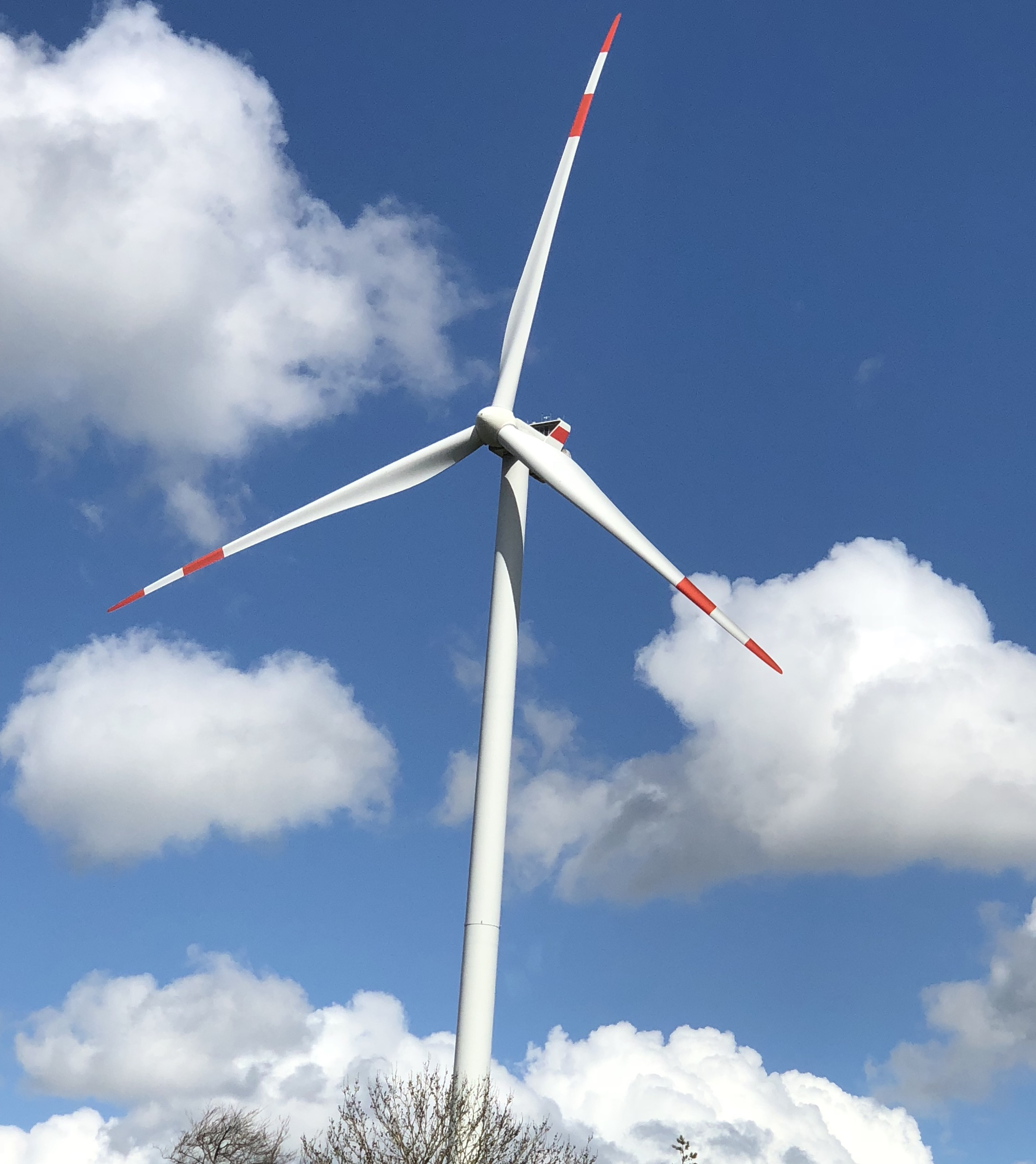
Wind energy generator

==== Installed capacity ====
Wind energy is the biggest renewable electricity resource in Austria after hydropower. Around 15% (3.5GW of 23.8GW) of the total installed capacity is wind power, as at November 2021.

Wind power capacity in MW
Year	Yearly added	Cumulative
1994	0	0
1995	1	1
1996	11	12
1997	8	20
1998	8	28
1999	13	41
2000	37	78
2001	18	96
2002	45	141
2003	268	409
2004	200	609
2005	215	824
2006	148	972
2007	19	991
2008	14	1005
2009	0	1005
2010	18	1023
2011	90	1113
2012	279	1392
2013	310	1702
2014	402	2104
2015	319	2423
2016	228	2651

==== Employment and revenue ====
Wind power in Austria employed around 11% of the workforce of the renewable energy sector and generated 993 million euros (13.8% of a total of 7,219 million euros generated by the renewable energy sector) of revenue in 2016.

=== Solar power ===
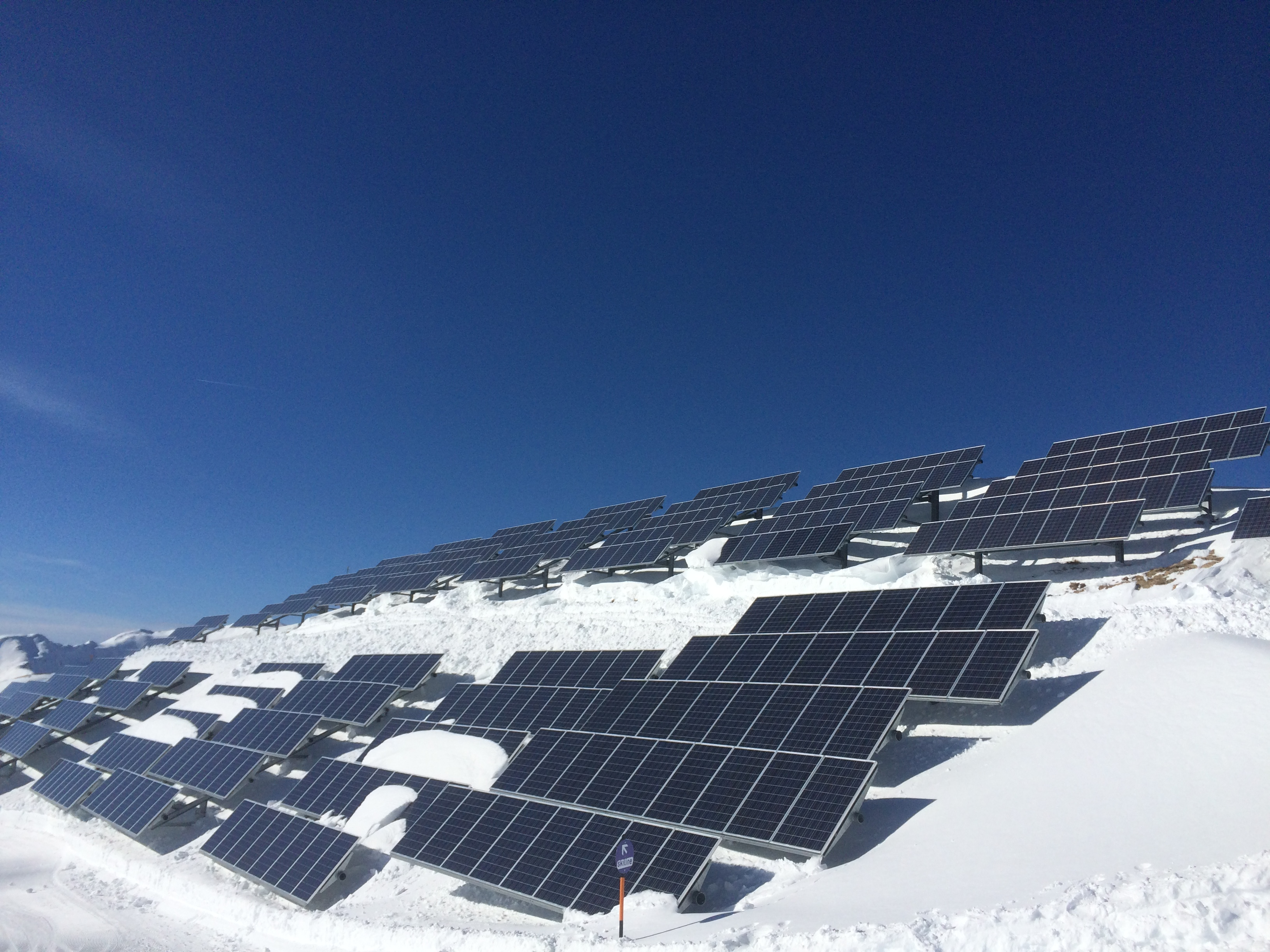
Solar park in the skiing resort "Wildkogel-Arena Neukirchen-Bramberg" in Salzburg

==== Installed capacity (solar PV) ====
With a share of 10.5%, or 2.5GW of a total 23.8GW of installed power plant capacity, solar energy is a prominent source of renewable energy in Austria.

Solar PV capacity in KW
Year	Yearly added	Cumulative
Until 1992	525	525
1993	244	769
1994	274	1.043
1995	298	1.341
1996	378	1.719
1997	469	2.188
1998	653	2.841
1999	741	3.582
2000	1.286	4.868
2001	1.230	6.098
2002	4.221	10.319
2003	6.472	16.791
2004	4.269	21.060
2005	2.961	24.021
2006	1.564	25.585
2007	2.116	27.701
2008	4.686	32.387
2009	20.209	52.596
2010	42.902	95.498
2011	91.674	187.172
2012	175.712	362.885
2013	263.089	625.974
2014	159.273	785.246
2015	151.851	937.098
2016	155.754	1.096.016

==== Final energy consumption provided by solar energy ====
Of the 112,260 GWh final energy consumption (heat, electricity, mobility) provided by renewable resources, solar energy had a combined energy production of 3,439 GWh (3%) in 2016 (1,096 GWh electricity through solar photovoltaics and 2,130 GWh through solar thermal).

==== Employment and revenue ====
Around 5.6% of people working in the renewable energy sector in Austria were working within solar thermal energy and around 8.2% were working within solar photovoltaics. This totals to 13.8% of people working in the renewable energy sector. This sector generated a combined revenue of 896 million euros in 2016, which was 12.4% of the total revenue generated by the renewable energy sector.

=== Biomass ===
Bioenergy in Austria mainly contributes to the renewable heating sector, producing 58% of renewable heat (31,386 GWh of a total 53,585 GWh) consumed. Ranking third in electricity production (3,226 GWh of 51,591 GWh) after hydropower and wind energy being the only source of biofuels for the transport sector (6,451 GWh), bioenergy has a total share of the final renewable energy consumption of 36.5%, outranking hydropower by 0.1%.

The solid biomass sector employs roughly 50% of the workforce in the renewable energy sector. All other bioenergy sectors employ 3.4% of renewable energy workers. In comparison, hydropower only employs 16% of the renewable energy workforce, but contributes 36.4% of the final energy consumption.

The revenue created by the biofuel (solid, fluid, and gaseous) sector was 2,764 million euros (38% of a total 7,219 million euros generated by the renewable sector).

=== Geothermal power ===
In Austria, geothermal power has a small potential of about 2,000 MW thermal power and 7 MW electric power. Geothermal power is mainly used for thermal baths. Only 25% of the deep drillings in Austria from 1977 until 2004 were used for electricity generation.

A research project on Vienna's geothermal potential, "GeoTief Wien", has estimated that the Aderklaaer conglomerate, located 3,000 M beneath the city, could provide sufficient hot water to heat 125.000 households by 2030.

In 2016, 0.02 GWh of electricity (of gross end energy consumption) were delivered by geothermal plants in Austria. Geothermal electricity had a share of only 0.1% (83 GWh) of the total Austrian energy consumption in 2016.
