= European Renewable Energy Council =

Defunct trade association

The European Renewable Energy Council (EREC) was founded in 2000 by the European renewable energy industry, trade and research associations. EREC was located in the Renewable Energy House in Brussels, a monument protected building with 100% renewable energy supply for heating and cooling.

== Overview ==
EREC acted as a representative in Brussels of the European Renewable industry and research community and acts as a forum for exchange of information and discussion on issues related to renewables. EREC provided information and consultancy on renewable energies for the political decision makers on local, regional, national and international levels.

In May 2014 the General Assembly of EREC decided for a voluntary dissolution which led to the liquidation of the association.

== Members ==
EREC was composed of the following non-profit associations and federations:

- AEBIOM (European Biomass Association)
- EGEC (European Geothermal Energy Council)
- EPIA (European Photovoltaic Industry Association)
- EREF (European Renewable Energies Federation)
- ESHA (European Small Hydropower Association)
- ESTIF (European Solar Thermal Industry Federation)
- EUBIA (European Biomass Industry Association)
- European Renewable Energy Research Centres Agency (EUREC)
- EWEA (European Wind Energy Association)

== Renewable-energy economy ==
In the Greenpeace and EREC's Energy (R)evolution scenario, the world could eliminate fossil fuel use by 2090.

According to EREC RE-thinking 2050, Europe could become a renewable-energy economy (using only renewable energy) by 2050.

== See also ==
- Millennium Development Goals
- European Wind Energy Association
- List of renewable energy organizations
- Sustainable Development Goals
