= German National Action Plan on Energy Efficiency =

The German National Action Plan on Energy Efficiency (NAPE) (German: Nationaler Aktionsplan Energieeffizienz) is the National Energy Efficiency Action Plan (NEEAP) for Germany. The plan was commissioned under EU Energy Efficiency Directive 2012/27/EU of the European Union and released on 3 December 2014. Under the plan, the German government offers an average increase of 2.1%/year in macroeconomic energy productivity from 2008 to 2020. (Note: For the purposes of the Nation Action Plan on Energy Efficiency, the period is specified as 2008–2020. In other official documents, the period is specified as 2008–2050.) The exact reduction in primary energy use is therefore dependent on the rate of economic growth. The NAPE is part of the Climate Action Programme 2020, also approved on 3 December 2014.

== Targets ==
The German government target under the National Action Plan on Energy Efficiency is specified in terms of energy productivity relative to gross domestic product (GDP). Under the plan, the German government offers an average annual increase of 2.1% in macroeconomic energy productivity from 2008 to 2020. Assuming an annual increase in GDP of 1.1%, this represents a reduction in the energy-related share of primary energy consumption (in million tonnes crude oil equivalent) from 314.3 Mtoe (13.2 EJ) in 2008 to 276.6 Mtoe (11.6 EJ) in 2020. And corresponds to a reduction in final energy consumption from 220.7 Mtoe (9.24 EJ) in 2008 to 194.3 Mtoe (8.13 EJ) in 2020. These projections are covered by a caveat on economic and physical influences beyond the control of the government.

This macroeconomic target is concurrent with other official energy efficiency and consumption targets not included in the National Action Plan on Energy Efficiency, in particular that of reducing primary energy consumption from 2008 levels by 20% in 2020 and by 50% in 2050.

== Policy and monitoring ==
The areas covered are the energy efficiency of buildings, energy conservation for companies, consumer energy efficiency, and transport energy efficiency. The policy contains both immediate and forward-looking measures. The central short-term measures of NAPE include the introduction of competitive tendering for energy efficiency, the raising of funding for building renovation, the introduction of tax incentives for efficiency measures in the building sector, and the setting up energy efficiency networks together with business and industry. German industry is expected to make a sizeable contribution.

The government's Fourth Energy Transition Monitoring Report, published in 2015, briefly reviews the National Action Plan on Energy Efficiency.

Government progress on its energy efficiency targets under NAPE and elsewhere (and on the Energiewende more generally) is subject to external review. The 2015 review found energy efficiency developments in electricity and space heating were roughly on track, although developments in transport were not. But because the various instruments introduced specifically under NAPE were still in planning, testing, or early introduction, the review panel was unable to analyse their effectiveness. These instruments will be covered in future reviews.

The 2016 annual report on NAPE, submitted to the EU on 28 April 2016, presented the major legislative and non-legislative energy efficiency measures adopted in the previous year. These include the Energy Efficiency Network Initiative aimed at companies, new obligations on non-SMEs to carry out regular energy audits, increased funding for energy efficient commercial renovation and new-build, and a new Energy Efficiency Strategy for Buildings (ESG) that may result in an "almost climate-neutral building stock". In addition, the government is in the process of developing a scheme to promote heating optimization, an energy efficiency program for waste heat, programs to increase the energy efficiency in municipalities, and measures to improve the use of energy in rail transport. The report also noted that final energy consumption in the transport sector rose by 3.9 PJ between 2013 and 2014, as a result of the increase in passenger-kilometres by around 2.0% and tonne-kilometres by around 1.3%, despite improvements in the final energy consumption per kilometre.

== See also ==
- Efficient energy use § Germany
- Energieeinsparverordnung (EnEV) – German building energy regulations
- Energiewende in Germany
- Energy law
- Federal Ministry for Economic Affairs and Energy (BMWi) – oversees the National Action Plan on Energy Efficiency (NAPE)
- German Climate Action Plan 2050
- German National Renewable Energy Action Plan
