= EU Energy Efficiency Directive 2012 =

European Union Directive for promoting energy efficiency

Directive 2012/27/EU
- European Union directive
- Title: Energy Efficiency Directive
- Made by: European Parliament and Council
- Journal reference: L 315, 14 November 2012, pp. 1–56

Other legislation
- Replaces: 2004/8/EC and 2006/32/EC
- Amends: 2009/125/EC and 2010/30/EU
- Amended by: 2018/2002/EC

The Energy Efficiency Directive 2012/27/EU (abbreviated EED) is a European Union directive which mandates energy efficiency improvements within the European Union. It was approved on 25 October 2012 and entered into force on 4 December 2012. The directive introduces legally binding measures to encourage efforts to use energy more efficiently in all stages and sectors of the supply chain. It establishes a common framework for the promotion of energy efficiency within the EU in order to meet its energy efficiency headline target of 20% by 2020. It also paves the way for further improvements thereafter.

The directive provides for the establishment of indicative national energy efficiency targets for 2020. Member states were to have submitted their National Energy Efficiency Action Plans (NEEAP) by 30 April 2014, outlining the measures they have implemented to improve energy efficiency and their expected and/or achieved energy savings. In addition, member states are required to report annually on progress toward their national targets. The policy requirements in the directive are minimum obligations and member states may introduce more stringent measures.

The Energy Efficiency Directive 2012/27/EU was preceded by the Energy Services Directive 2006/32/EC. This earlier directive contained a target of a 9% reduction in energy usage within 9 years of the directive coming into force. The earlier directive also required EU members to submit National Energy Efficiency Action Plans, with the first plan to be lodged by 30 June 2007.

On 23 July 2014, the European Commission announced a new target of a 30% improvement in energy efficiency by 2030.

== Development ==
Documents leaked in mid-2012 show that the United Kingdom repeatedly fought to water down key measures during the development of the directive and forced some measures to become voluntary rather than mandatory. As a result, a new version of the directive allows member states to set their own energy efficiency targets, instead of the original requirement of a mandatory EU-wide target of 20% improvement.

== Measures ==
The directive promotes rules to remove barriers in energy markets and to overcome market failures that may impede the uptake of energy efficiency. Under the directive, the public sector is to play an exemplary role and consumers will have a right to know how much energy they consume.

The following categories are covered by the directive:

- energy efficiency targets
- building renovation
- an exemplary role for public buildings
- energy efficiency obligation schemes
- energy audits and energy management systems
- metering and billing information systems and the right to access this data
- consumer information and empowerment
- promotion of efficiency in heating and cooling
- energy transformation, transmission, and distribution
- availability of qualification, accreditation, and certification schemes
- information and training
- energy services
- an energy efficiency national fund, financing, and technical support
- other measures to promote energy efficiency

== National Energy Efficiency Action Plans and Annual Reports ==
Individual National Energy Efficiency Action Plans (NEEAP) for 2014 and Annual Reports for 2016 are available for download. Some national action plans have Wikipedia articles as well:

- German National Action Plan on Energy Efficiency

== Reception and effectiveness ==
A 2014 study finds that, despite the directive being technically complex and lacking binding targets, it is an improvement over earlier European Union policy on energy efficiency. Notwithstanding, the document is weakened by the number of exemptions and the number of passages it contains requiring interpretation. The process of implementation was also subject to problems.

In June 2014 the UK government directed through a Procurement Policy Note issued to all government departments that they were to comply after 5 June 2014 with the energy efficiency standards of Article 6 and Annex III to the Directive when purchasing goods and services and when renting or purchasing buildings, as long as this is "consistent with achieving value for money, economic feasibility, wider sustainability, technical suitability and ensuring sufficient competition". Further information issued in January 2015 made clear that "the obligation under Article 6 is a qualified one" and that public bodies "need only buy to the standards set out in Annex III of the Directive where this is cost effective". Public bodies in the wider public sector outside of central government were "encouraged" to follow the central government example.

A 2016 study examined the treatment of article 7 of the directive by each of the 28 member states. Titled Energy efficiency obligation schemes, this key article requires that countries "implement energy efficiency obligations and/or alternative policy instruments in order to reach a reduction in final energy use of 1.5% per year". To fulfill this requirement, the member states have proposed very different policy measures and adopted very different calculation methods and monitoring and verification schemes. The study analyses each national action plan and estimates whether the projected savings are likely to materialise and whether these will be sufficient to meet the article 7 target.

== Future developments ==
Directive 2018/2002/EC was adopted on 21 December 2018. It amends this one.

== See also ==
- Energy conservation
- Energy efficiency in Europe (study) – a study as part of the Odyssee Mure project
- Energy efficiency in Europe § National Energy Efficiency Action Plans
- Energy law
- Energy policy of the European Union
- Energy Taxation Directive
- EU Renewable Energy Directive 2009/28/EC – a similar directive covering renewable energy
- European Union directive
- German National Action Plan on Energy Efficiency (abbreviated NAPE)
- List of European Union directives
- White certificates – which certify a reduction in energy consumption
