= Renewable Energy Directive 2018 =

European Union Directive for promoting renewable energy

Directive 2018/2001
- European Union directive
- Title: Renewable Energy Directive 2018
- Made by: European Parliament and Council
- Journal reference: L 140, 5 June 2009, pp. 16–62

Other legislation
- Replaces: Directive 2009/28 and Directive 2001/77/EC and 2003/30/EC

The Renewable Energy Directive 2018 (2018/2001) is a Directive in EU law that requires 42.5 percent of the energy consumed within the European Union to be renewable by 2030. This target is pooled among the member states.

== Background ==
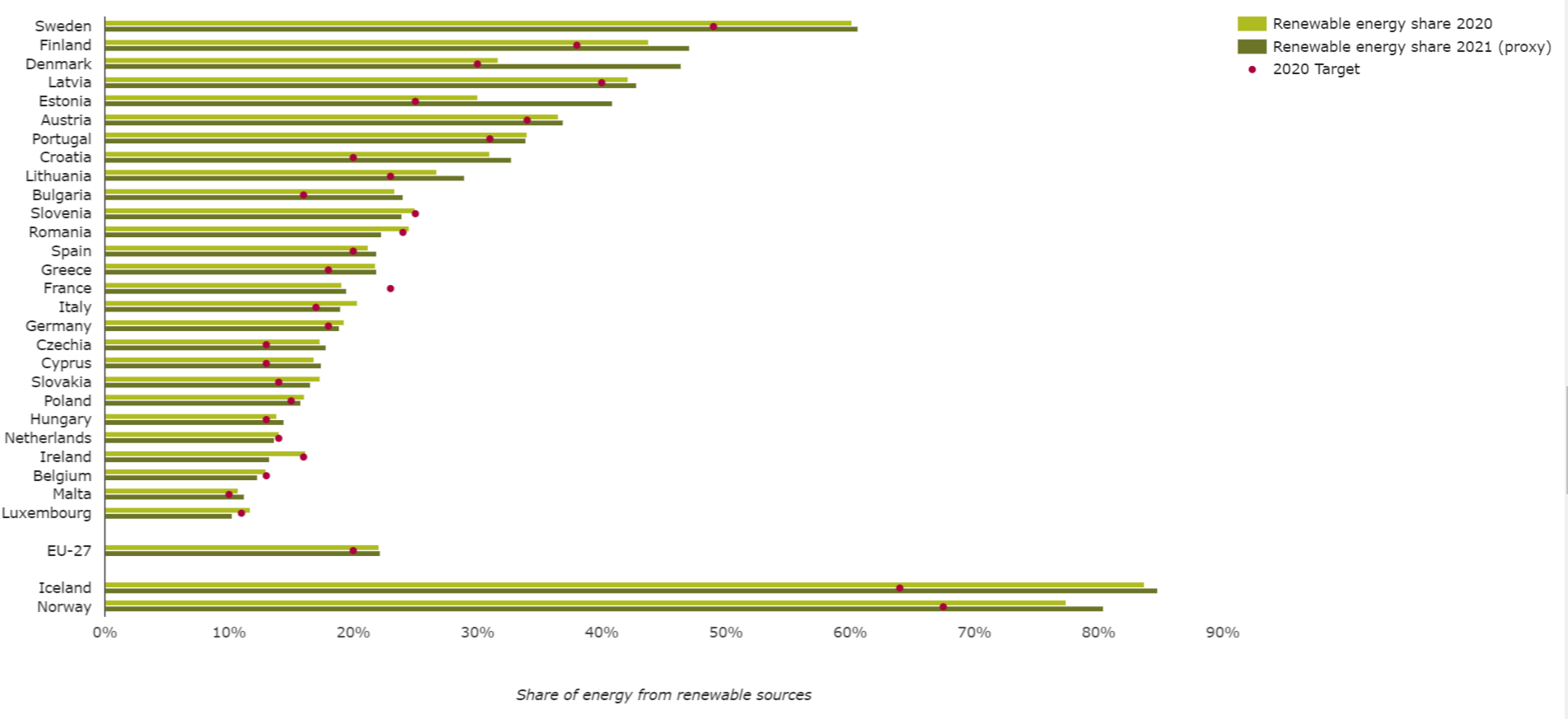
Renewable Energy Directive 2009 fulfillment: Share of energy consumption from renewable sources for EU and EEA countries 2020 and 2021, compared to the targets for 2020. EU27 plus United Kingdom pledged an average of 20 percent renewable energy for 2020, and EU27 reached 22 percent.

Before the 2009 version of the Directive, EU leaders had already reached agreement in March 2007 that, in principle, 20% of the bloc's final energy consumption should be produced from renewable energy sources by 2020 as part of its drive to cut carbon dioxide emissions. This policy later became part of the EU 2020 Energy Strategy dated 10 November 2010. The key objectives of the strategy are to reduce carbon dioxide emissions by 20%, to increase the share of renewable energy to 20%, and to achieve energy savings of 20% or more. The targets are mutually dependent.

The draft report on the directive was published by the European Commission in January 2008. Claude Turmes served as rapporteur on the draft. Members states were obliged to notify the European Commission by 30 June 2010 of a National Renewable Energy Action Plan which sets out the road map of the trajectory. Member states also have to submit progress reports explaining their implementation of the directive and their progress towards their targets, as is required by article 22 of the directive.

A June 2015 report from the European Commission shows that EU countries are on track to meet the aggregate 20% goal.

The 2009 Directive was substantially changed and replaced through a 2018 recast, sometimes known as the "Renewable Energy Directive II", with the a new objective of a minimum of 32% renewable energy by 2030. The Fit for 55 package proposed by the European Commission in July 14 proposes further changes that significantly revise this recast version of the Directive, and is currently (June 2022) making its way through the legislative process.

== Contents ==
Article 3 sets the main target that at least 42.5% renewable by 2030 in gross final consumption (this was 32% from 2018-2023, and previous target was 20% by 2020).

Article 7 defines gross final consumption as based on electricity, heating and colling, transport.

Annex I set out the Member State 2020 targets for renewable energy (but these are no longer in force, and Annex V defines how biofuel use should be calculated for the purpose of fulfilling renewable energy quotas.

Article 21 makes Member States make sure that consumers can generate renewable electricity for their own consumption, store it, and sell excess production, subject to the conditions set out in the directive. Article 22 sets out rights for renewable energy communities to produce, consume, store, and sell renewable energy, and to share energy generated by community owned installations among their members.

=== 2009 national targets for renewable energy ===
The overall EU target for renewable energy use is 20% by the year 2020. Targets for renewable energy in each country vary from a minimum of 10% in Malta to 72% of total energy use in Iceland.

National overall targets for the share of energy from renewable sources in gross final consumption of energy in 2020
National overall targets	2005 share	2020 target
Austria	23.3%	34%
Belgium	2.2%	13%
Bulgaria	9.4%	16%
Cyprus	2.9%	13%
Czech Republic	6.1%	13%
Denmark	17.0%	30%
Estonia	18.0%	25%
Finland	28.5%	38%
France	10.3%	23%
Germany	5.8%	18%
Greece	6.9%	18%
Hungary	4.3%	13%
Iceland *	63.4%	72%
Ireland	3.1%	16%
Italy	5.2%	17%
Latvia	32.6%	40%
Lithuania	15.0%	23%
Luxembourg	0.9%	11%
Malta	0.0%	10%
Netherlands	2.4%	14%
Norway *	60.1%	67.5%
Poland	7.2%	15%
Portugal	20.5%	31%
Romania	17.8%	24%
Slovakia	6.7%	14%
Slovenia	16.0%	25%
Spain	8.7%	20%
Sweden	39.8%	49%
United Kingdom	1.3%	15%
* Iceland and Norway have submitted Renewable Energy Action Plans to the EU Commission with 2020 targets and details of their development steps.

=== 2018 national targets for renewable energy ===
The overall EU target for renewable energy use was set at 32% by the year 2030. In contrast to the 2020 renewable energy target, the 2030 renewable energy target is only binding at EU level and there are no binding targets for the individual Member States anymore.

=== 2023 updates ===
The overall EU target was updated to 42.5% with an additional clause that "Member States shall collectively endeavour to increase the share of energy from renewable sources in the Union’s gross final consumption of energy in 2030 to 45 %".

== See also ==
- Directive 2001/77/EC – a superseded directive dating from 2001
- European Union directive
- Energy law
- EU energy efficiency directive
- EU law
- List of European Union directives
- National Renewable Energy Action Plans
- Renewable Fuels Regulators Club
- UK enterprise law
