= Coal in Finland =

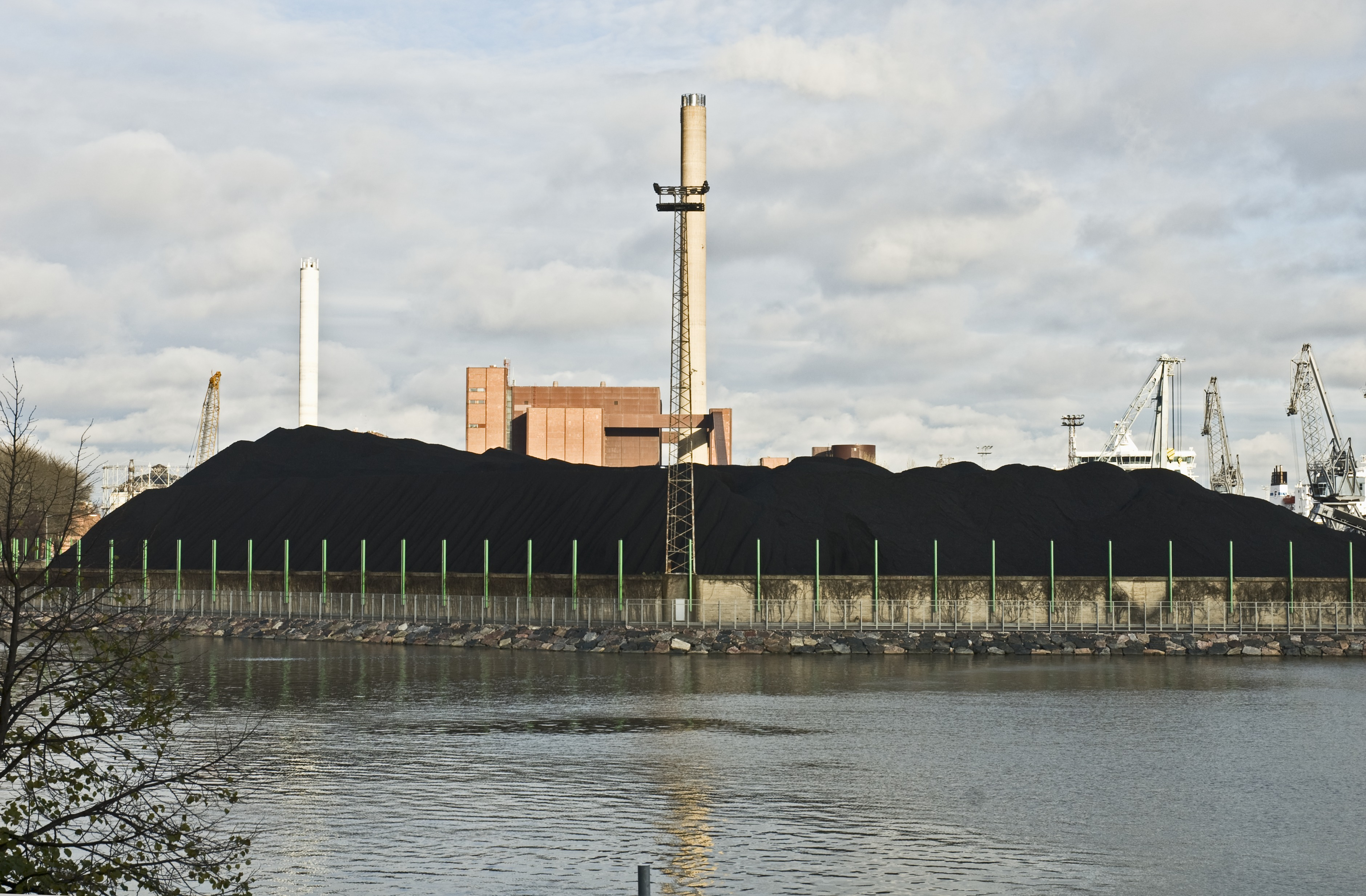
A Coal pile in Hanasaari, Helsinki

Coal is used as an energy source in Finland. Since Finland has no domestic coal production, it must import it from other countries, primarily from Russia. Finland is a peat-producing nation. Peat is classified as coal by the IEA. In 2016, the Finnish government announced plans to phase out coal by 2030.

In 2021, the total energy supply (TES) featured a diverse mix of sources. Bioenergy and waste were the largest contributors at 33.6%, followed by oil (20.8%), nuclear energy (18.5%), and coal (6.3%).

In March 2022, the European Union (EU) introduced sanctions that resulted in a complete ban on importing Russian coal, which became fully operational by August 2022.

== Climate policy ==
The National Climate and Energy Strategy (NCES) sets out Finland's plan for meeting the EU's energy and climate goals for 2030, along with its own national targets. These commitments involve reducing greenhouse gas (GHG) emissions by 60% by 2030, achieving carbon neutrality by 2035, and phasing out the importation of Russian energy.

== Coal ==
There is no coal mining or coal tar in Finland, and all coal is imported. According to Finnwatch (27.9.2010) there are 13 coal power plants in Finland. The companies Pohjolan Voima, Fortum, Helsingin Energia and Rautaruukki are the largest coal consumers. According to the Finnwatch inquiry in 2010 none of the Finnish companies had yet a commitment to coal phase out. Energy companies stated following reductions in their future coal use: Helsingin Energia -40% by 2020, Lahti Energia several tens of % by 2012 and Vantaan Energia -30% by 2014. In October 2018, the Finnish parliament approved a government proposal to ban the use of coal to produce energy from May 1, 2029. According to Statistics Finland, the consumption of hard coal decreased by three percent in 2018 in comparison 2017. The consumption of hard coal as a fuel in the generation of electricity and heat amounted to 3.1 million tonnes, corresponding to 79 petajoules (PJ) in energy content.

Between 2011 and 2021, Finland saw a notable transformation in its energy mix. The proportion of fossil fuels in the total energy supply (TES) decreased from 53% to 36%, with a decline observed in all fossil fuel types. Notably, the share of coal in the TES fell from 11% to 6.3% over the decade.

== Peat ==
Finland is a producer of peat, which by the definition of IEA is considered as a form of coal. Peat is environmentally controversial and disputed domestic soil material. Peat balances the water levels and prevents floods. Peatland plants captures the carbon dioxide in the atmosphere and hence, it is said that the peatland ecosystem is an efficient carbon sink. Undisturbed peat soil areas are rich in flora and fauna.

Vapo Oy is the largest peat producer. In 1994 Vapo had 80% of markets in Finland. Vapo was state owned company until 2002. Metsäliitto bought one third in 2002 and 49,9% in 2004. The acquisition was studied by the Finnish competition authorities in 2001 based on dominant position in the peat business. The European Commission accepted the deal. In 2009 Metsäliitto sold its share with 165 million € to Etelä-Pohjanmaan Voima Oy (EPV Oy). In practice, Vapo is owned by the state, EPV and the major plants using peat, in the way that EPV has the A series stocks.

Peat energy of Vapo is danger to the sustainability of bogs in Finland.

Between 2011 and 2021, the proportion of peat in the total energy supply (TES) decreased from 5.8% to 2.7%, reflecting the overall trend observed across all fossil fuel types.

== Coal import ==
Finland imported 18.3 million tons of coal in 2007–2009. The share of coal by country of origin in 2007-2009 was: Russia 72.5%, the United States 7.3%, Canada 6.6%, Australia 5.9%, Poland 3.0%, South Africa 1.4%, Columbia 1.3%, and Indonesia 1.1%. The majority of Finnish coal is mined in the Kuznetsk Basin of the Kemerovo Oblast, Russia.

Coal import in Finland
| | 2007 | 2008 | 2009 |
|---|---|---|---|
| Russia | 4,824,000 | 3,770,000 | 4,683,000 |
| United States | 355,000 | 532,000 | 443,000 |
| Canada | 529,000 | 393,000 | 293,000 |
| Australia | 559,000 | 292,000 | 223,000 |
| Poland | 270,000 | 88,000 | 189,000 |
| South Africa | - | 254,000 | - |
| Columbia | 88,000 | 68,000 | 74,000 |
| Indonesia | - | 194,000 | 13,000 |
| Norway | 17,000 | 46,000 | 7,000 |
| Kazakhstan | 13,000 | 33,000 | 19,000 |
| Others | 15,000 | 1,000 | 15,000 |
| Total | 6,670,000 | 5,671,000 | 5,959,000 |

== Carbon dioxide emissions ==
Carbon dioxide emissions by fuel: coal
| | million ton of CO2 | | | | | % of fossil total | |
| | Fossil | Hard coal | Other coal | Peat | Coal total | Peat | Coal total |
|---|---|---|---|---|---|---|---|
| 1990 | 53.0 | 12 | 3 | 6 | 20.1 | 10.6 | 37.9 |
| 2000 | 53.1 | 9 | 4 | 7 | 19.4 | 12.2 | 36.5 |
| 2004 | 64.3 | 16 | 4 | 9 | 28.7 | 14.5 | 44.6 |
| 2005 | 52.8 | 8 | 4 | 7 | 18.3 | 13.6 | 34.7 |
| 2006 | 64.1 | 15 | 4 | 10 | 28.9 | 15.3 | 45.1 |
| 2007 | 61.8 | 13 | 4 | 11 | 27.4 | 17.3 | 44.3 |
| 2008 | 53.7 | 9 | 3 | 9 | 20.7 | 15.8 | 38.5 |
Other coal: coke, blast furnace gas, coke oven gas, coal tar and other non specified coal

== See also ==
- Energy in Finland
- Energy policy of Finland
- Electricity sector in Finland
- Electricity generation
