= Energy policy of Finland =

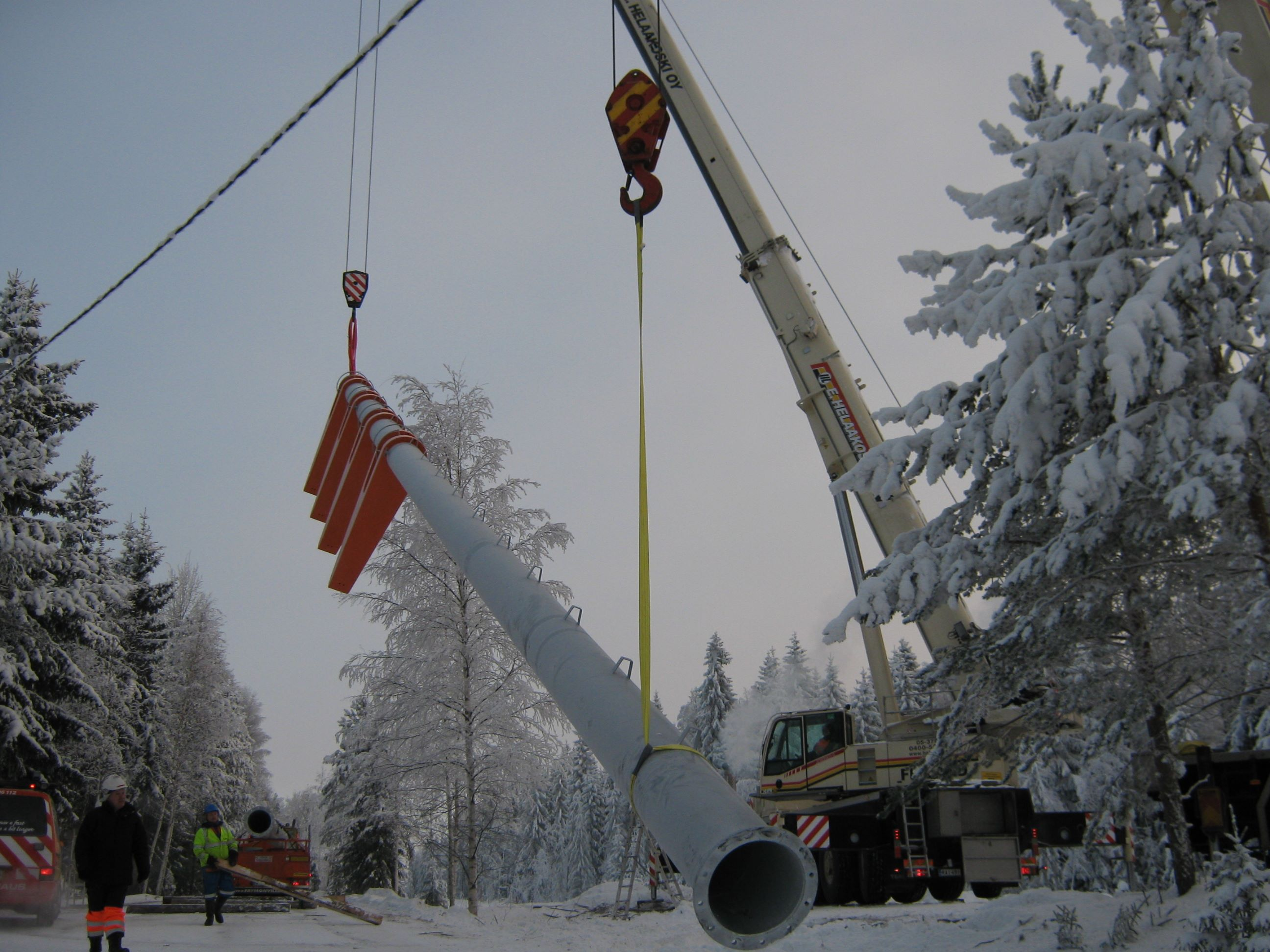
Power line pylon being erected in Kouvola, Finland

Energy policy of Finland describes the politics of Finland related to energy. Energy in Finland describes energy and electricity production, consumption and import in Finland. Electricity sector in Finland is the main article of electricity in Finland.

== Climate policy ==
Finland is member of the EU. The EU sets the minimum climate policy targets for Finland.

According to Heikki Simola of the Finnish Association of Nature Conservation, Finnish forest management has made Finnish forest and mire ecosystems as a considerable net source of carbon into the atmosphere for decades.

=== Peat ===
10–15% of European peat lands are in Finland. Finland uses over 50% of the world's peat as energy. The annual emissions of Finnish energy peat are equal to all car emissions in Finland. According to IPCC peat is fossil energy. In some estimates, it takes 2000–3000 years to build up. Some parties e.g. Center claim peat to be bioenergy. The definition of bioenergy in Finnish individual statistics may be good to confirm in general. The business annual turnover of energy peat in Finland is €300 million- Annual state support is €200 million. This support was increased after European price on coal to compensate the extra cost to industry. €200 million is equal to mission funds for elderly care in 2019 in Finland.

In electricity production, peat's share of CO_{2} emissions is 20% while it produces 6% of electricity in Finland. Finland is appraised of its high knowledge of using bioenergy. Finland burns wood with peat and processes are developed to use peat (ref voima 9.9.2019)

According to Stern report it is cheaper to stop the global warming emissions than pay the climate change costs. Polluter pays principle allocate a big share of climate change-related agriculture losses compensations in Finland to the peat producers to pay for long time in future. According to the environmental law in Europe businesses must be aware of their environmental impacts. Ignorance does not remove the responsibility.

=== Carbon tax ===
Finland was the first country in the 1990s to introduce a carbon tax, initially with exemptions for specific fuels or sectors. Energy taxation was changed many times. These changes were related to the opening of the Nordic electricity market. Other Nordic countries exempted energy-intensive industries, and Finnish industries felt disadvantaged by this. Finland placed a border tax on imported electricity, but this was found to be out of line with EU single market legislation. Changes were then made to the carbon tax to partially exclude energy-intensive firms. This had the effect of increasing the costs of reducing CO_{2} emissions.

Scholars suggested that carbon tax revenues in Finland could be used to reduce labour taxes, which would favour non-energy-intensive industries.

== Electricity ==
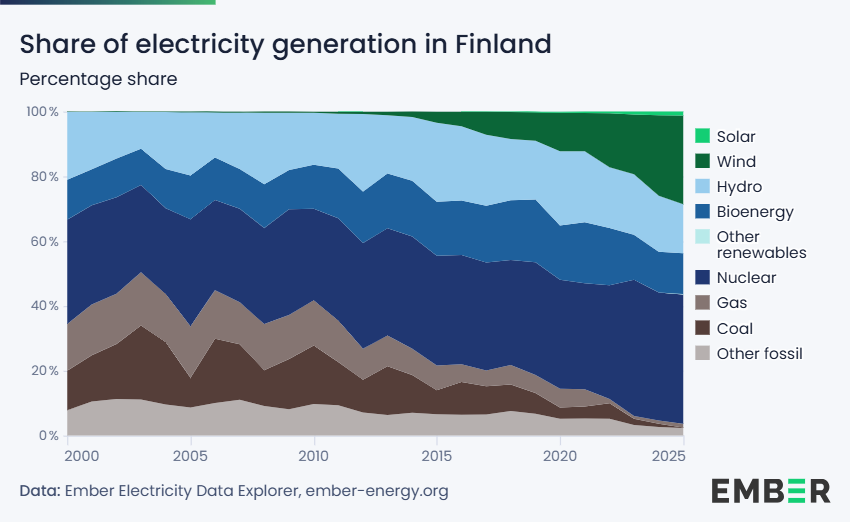
Share of electricity generation in Finland - percentage share

The annual net import of electricity has varied between 5 and 20% of consumption.

=== Lighting ===
In EU politics Finnish government supported the delay in the banning of incandescent lightbulbs.

According to the national state-owned energy center Motiva banning of incandescent lightbulbs will save 5.8% of households electricity (1.1 TWh) in Finland. The lightbulbs banning is not restricted in households but concern also other sectors lighting, like industry, service, agriculture and public lighting, making the total national percentage lower and total energy savings higher than the above-given numbers 5.8% of electricity 1.1 TWh. Motiva calculation may have used average year consumption instead of the specific year e.g. 2006. According to the statistics of Finland, in 2006 the electricity used in households was 10.6 TWh excluding the electricity warming that was 9.1 TWh. Thus 1.1/19.7 would be ca 5.6% in 2006. Excluding electric warming it would be 10.4% of household electricity.

=== Nuclear power ===
Finland's five reactors are among the world's most efficient, with an average lifetime capacity factor of over 90% and average capacity factor over the last ten years of almost 95%, and covers 40% of the country's electricity

In 2019 In Finland the nuclear power owners responsibility of major accident is 700 million euros that state can rise by €70 million in maximum. Fukushima accident cost $167 million. Many major nuclear plant accidents have taken place: Chernobyl disaster 1986, Tsuruga Nuclear Power Plant Japan 1995, Rocky Flats Plant USA 1957 and UK Sellafield 1955.

In the 1980s the nuclear accident costs for the nuclear plant in Finland were limited to 1.6 mrd markka (0.26 mrd €). The estimated cost of Chernobyl disaster 1986 is hundreds of bn dollars. Also the EU has kept supporting Russia in the expenses of the Tšernobyl disaster still in 2010. The general environmental policy of EU is that the polluter pays. This does not apply the external costs of nuclear power that are in Finland diluted to all national tax payers and in the case of nuclear disaster probably further to all tax payers of the European Union.

After environmental committee inquiry the target was told to be 5%. Only 10% of the Finnish climate emissions are from electricity. According to Pöyry Energy (2008) addition of nuclear energy would reduce Finnish climate emissions 4% (2,8 Mt) and majority of the electricity would be for export. In addition, the major nuclear companies Fortum and PVO plan new coal companies.

=== Transmission ===
Fingrid Oyj is a Finnish national electricity transmission grid operator. In Finland the electricity transmission costs were informed in September 2010 to rise for everybody in 2012 at least 10% based on the needed transmission line investments demanded by the new Olkiluoto nuclear plant under construction in 2005–2013. The transmission lines are owned by Fingrid. The nuclear companies Fortum and PVO were 50% shareholders of Fingrid. Both of them are shareholders of the nuclear power plant under construction in 2005–2013. According to the EU decisions the power companies should not own the grid. Representatives of the social democrat party supported in 2008 the 100% state ownership and control of Fingrid including acquisitions from the nuclear and insurance companies. Finnish state and the insurance company Ilmarinen will take over a 50% share of Fingrid from the nuclear companies Fortum and PVO as announced in January 2011.

=== Electricity costs ===
The industry electricity tariffs are lower than other users. In Finland the electricity pricing of households promotes electricity use with high fixed prices and increasing price reductions for higher consumption. The annual transmission costs for at least a moderate energy user (less than 2 MWh a year, a typical German consumption) can be higher than the actual electricity cost. With this consumption level the fixed costs may be around 0.25-0.3 % of total electricity costs. According to the newspaper discussions in some contracts the fixed cost can be substantial also when there is no electricity use and the power lines are old. The fixed costs may be a significant cost factor in the evaluation of own renewable electricity production. This applies also alternatives to fossil heating if connection to old system is in place. Most often only the remote summer cottages have no connection in the transmission power lines with annual fixed costs. At least until the end of 2010 there was no compensation of extra electricity fed in the power lines. This is also valid in 2011 for small-scale domestic or agricultural farm production. The electricity feed in policy of government have mainly supported the large energy companies economical interests. The shift in the charge of electricity consumption instead of the present trend to increase of the fixed prices would promote economically the energy savings and renewable energy investments. This could be politically controlled since the business interest is to promote high energy consumption.

== Energy security and domestic energy ==
Energy security measures center on reducing dependence on any one source of imported energy or supplier, exploiting renewable energy resources, and reducing demand by energy conservation. Finland is highly dependent on energy import from Russia: 71% of total energy in 2007: Hard coal 92%, raw oil 75% and natural gas 100%. The support of domestic energy has been mainly based on traditional bioenergy and highly disputed fossil peat energy alternatives. The new renewable energy alternatives have not been effectively promoted by the end of 2010. This strategy was criticised by the IEA in its country evaluation in 2007. According to the renewable energy statistics of EU countries Finland has low capacities of wind power (19/27), solar power (17/27) and solar heating (23/27) in 2010. Wind power is repeatedly the most favoured power source in Finland with over 90% of support according to the public opinion tests. In this respect the official energy policy of Finland has promoted the market control of traditional energy sources and companies.

== Renewable energy ==
Renewable energy target of electricity was 35% in 2005 from 1997 to 2010. In 2006 the target was dropped in 31.5% from 1997 to 2010. The RE electricity share was about the same in 1997 as in 2009. Since the consumption of electricity increased, the use of fossil fuel electricity increased as well. Since the energy statistics of Finland have rather high annual variations, for more accurate energy trend evaluations one may want to calculate also e.g. five year averages.

Renewable Electricity
Year	RE	RE electricity/ total electricity (GWh)	RE without hydro electricity
1997	26.2%	19,269 / 73,603	10.2%
2000	28.6%	22,676 / 79,158	10.4%
2001	25.7%	20,887 /81,188	9.7%
2005	26.7%	22,586 / 84,672	10.8%
2006	24.1%	21,670 / 90,024	11.5%
2009	25.9%	20,900 / 80,795	10.3%
RE = Renewable electricity

=== Hydro electricity ===
Most hydroelectricity capacity was built before year 1997. Fortum owns the majority of water power. Fortum received most of its hydroelectricity power capacity in the disputed acquisition of the same size national company and mainly renewable electricity company Imatran Voima. Fortum was until then mainly a nuclear company. Finnish competition authorities approved the deal.

=== Wind power ===
The wind power target of Finland was 494 MW wind power by 2010. Only 40%, 197 MW of the target, was achieved in 2010.

=== Solar energy ===
==== Solar heating ====
Solar heating is the usage of solar energy to provide space or water heating. Solar heating per capita in Finland was among the lowest in the EU in 2010, with high unused domestic energy opportunities (W/capita): Finland 4, Latvia 3, Estonia 1 and Lithuania 1. Corresponding capacity was in other Scandinavian countries Denmark 68 and Sweden 33.

During 1995–2010 Finland's target was 50 GWh solar heating According to ESTIF estimation in end 2010 solar heating capacity was 23 MW in Finland, 379 MW in Denmark and 312 MW in Sweden. During 2010, the European solar heating yield was 17.3 TWh with capacity 24,114 MW, saving 12 million tons of CO_{2}. In Europe the solar heating average yield was about 0.7 GWh per MW (17.3 TWh/24,114 MW). With this average ratio Finland's estimated capacity in 2010 would equal 23 *0.717= 16 GWh. This was 32% of the national target by 2010.

==== Solar power ====
During 1995–2010 Finland's target was 40 MW solar power capacity addition producing 50 GWh solar power. In 2010 Finland's total solar power capacity was 10 MW. This was 25% of the national target by 2010.

== Space heating ==
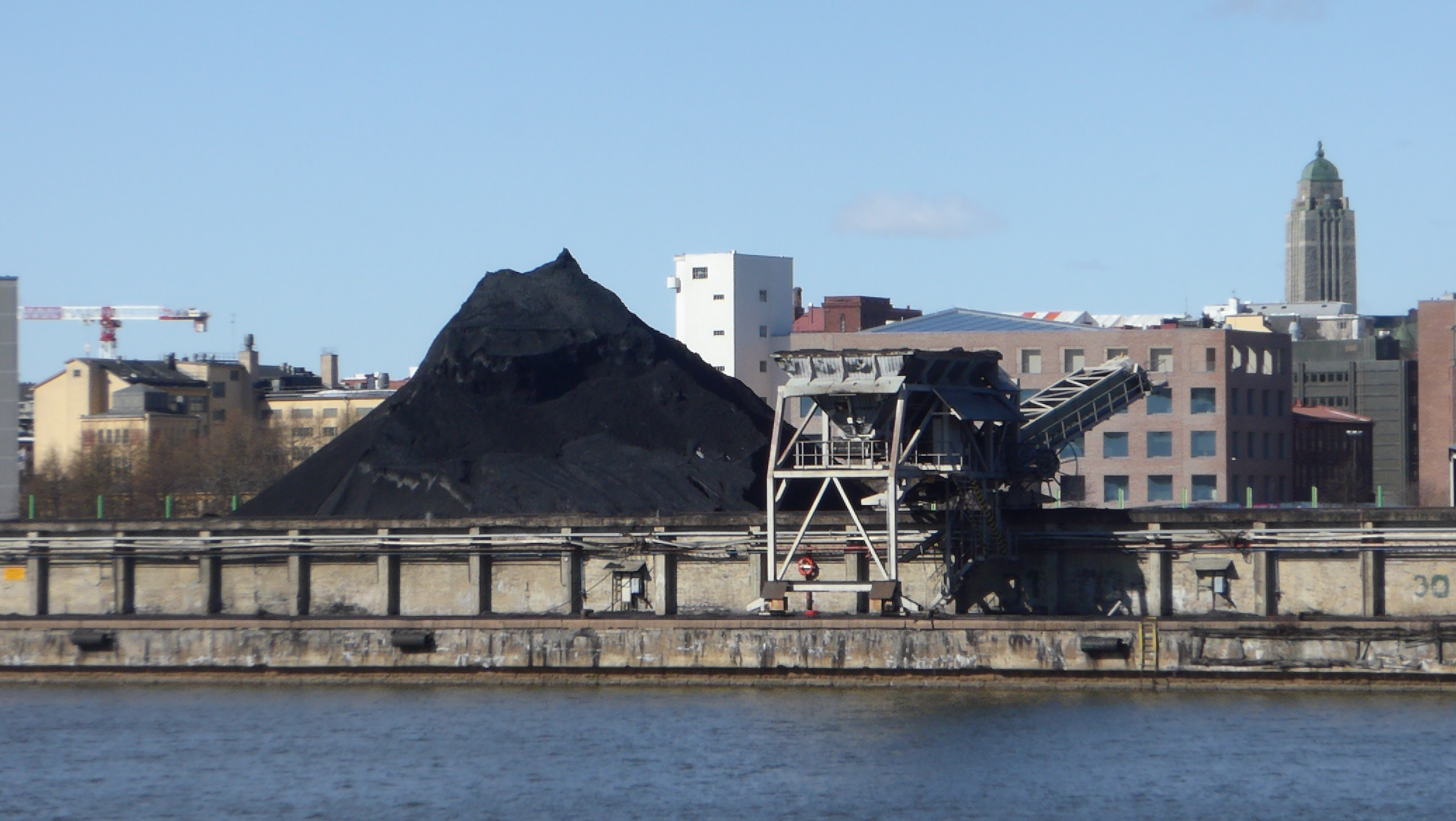
Hanasaari Power Plant in April 2023 in its expected last days of operation. In the background the area of Sörnäinen, with TeaK, and Kallio Church.

In 2006 the energy for space heating was 19.5% of total end energy consumption in Finland divided in 44% by fuels, 39% by district heating and 17% by electricity. The district heating systems are mainly monopolies controlled by local politicians or private companies. In practice the owners of the houses with district heating system have no influence in the choice of energy sources or prices.

For example, the politicians of Espoo sold the public district heating system for the big energy company Fortum in 2006. Since then the district heating prices in Espoo have kept rising and Espoo city has lost tens of millions of euros annually in the energy business compared to nearby cities Helsinki and Vantaa. Further the tax payers have higher district heating costs. Fortum uses 100% fossil energy of natural gas from Russia for district heating. In 2010 Fortum lobbied for the total restriction by law of all renewable energy alternatives within the district heating areas. This has not been realised, but the renewable alternatives have more control by the public permission system since 2010. The total energy company deal from Espoo to Fortum was worth of 365 million euros for Espoo. The investment of these funds have not given the claimed 5-6% return. In fact, 15 million € was invested in Kaupthing that was in bankruptcy on 9.10.2008. Further Espoo lent a sum of 82 million euros to the state for a motor way project (Kehä 1) with no interest at all during 2008–2013. Even though the commercial investors have received large compensations for their work from Espoo city energy gains, the media have given the impression that the return of funds have not compensated the tax payers costs. In short, the deal can be considered successful for the nuclear company Fortum, but unsuccessful for the Espoo tax payers. There is no effective free competition for district heating in place. Further, one hardly can avoid the impression that the energy and construction companies have mutual interests to promote the dependency on Russian energy. Neither Finnish construction nor energy companies have at least until end 2010 actively promoted higher energy efficiency standards and alternative energy source obligations.

=== Low energy houses ===
Among the supporters of solar heating in Finland is architect Bruno Erat who successfully applied solar heating in Finland in the 1970s. Bruno Erat built in 1978 the first low energy building in Finland. In 2010 a new low energy house in Heinola Finland saved 70% in warming expenses compared to the equal average warming expenses. According to Mikko Saari (VTT 2004) a low energy block of flats in Finland would save 400 000–€1 000 000 in warming costs in 50 years with 3-6% annual energy price increase. There is an ongoing significant construction boom in Finland based on old and high energy demand construction standards since the energy cost payment is paid by the users and future generations but not the construction industry nor its leaders early retirement payrolls. The government strategy (published in 2008) had no aim to reduce the total energy use of buildings by 2020. Many construction companies operating in Finland have also business in Russia.

According to Mr Lauri Myllyvirta Greenpeace (2008) the potential energy savings in the buildings correspond the electricity of three nuclear plants. In 2011 Finland has four nuclear plants and one under construction with an original scheduled start in 2009.

== Climate and energy strategy 2008 ==
Government energy strategy in October 2008
	Use 2005 TWh	Use 2020 TWh	Growth /%
Primary energy	381	430	12.9%
Electricity total	84.9	98	15.4%
Industry and building	44.2	56	26.7%
Houses	12.7	13	2.4%
Electric warming	8.8	8	-9.1%
Services	14.7	16	8.8%
Other use	4.6	5	8.7%
Other energy	216.7	212	-2.2%
Energy end use	302	310	2.6%
RE of end use	86	118	
RE of end use	28.5%	38.0%	9.5%-units
RE of primary energy*	24.9%	29.8%	4.9%-units
*page 41: 84.9 TWh year 2005 and 128 TWh year 2020

The government of Finland made the climate and energy strategy in October 2008. It considers energy in 2005, 2020 and 2050. According to this plan the primary energy use in Finland will increase 13% from 2005 to 2020. The use of electricity will grow more 15.4% that energy in average. The same period 2005-2020 the energy use of industry and building is allowed to increase 26.7%. According to the government plan RE of end use will increase 9.5% from 2005 to 2020 but only 4.9% RE of the primary energy use. This shows the importance of definitions.

The governmental plan 2008 does not address with a clear message the European Union obligation for 20% energy saving by 2020. In Finnish government target 2008 both the electricity and energy use will increase by 2020. Energy efficiency has a key role in the European climate and energy strategy since March 2007. The European Council has target of 20% energy saving by 2020. The national plans that should include 9% energy saving until 2016 and 20% saving until 2020, were to be delivered to the EU commission in 2007. Some countries set higher targets than the EU obligation. E.g. German target was 30% saving in the public energy use during 1990–2012. British target was carbon neutral state buildings by 2012. Finnish strategy includes to move energy intensive companies abroad.

== Sectors ==
=== Forest industry ===
Finnish forest companies are significant players in the global forest industry policy. See e.g. UPM, Stora Enso and M real Metsäliitto.

In 2007 the forest industry electricity use was 30.7% of total electricity use in Finland and 53% of all industry electricity use in Finland. In the government target the industry energy use will increase 26.7% from 2005 to 2020. The big issue here is that if the industry is allowed to continue its business as usual and increase the energy use, the politicians are obliged to shift the burden of needed energy revolution demand double higher for all the rest of the society.

The Russian timber tax policy has been part of the energy politics in Finland. In 2010 ca 20% of Finnish forest industry was based on Russian timber. However, the Russian timber export was highest in China. The Russian timber tax policy was also part of WTO negotiations in 2008. The Finnish ministers discussed the timber tax with the Russian leaders several times e.g. in 2008.

The increase of energy demand during 2005-2020 is somewhat in conflict with the daily news of the forest industry. During 2000-2010 several forest industry plants have been sold or shut down in Finland and started new forest plants in the Asia and South America. According to industry there were ca 50 forest industry plants in Finland in 2010. According to Helsingin Sanomat (Mr. Jyrki Iivonen) the employment reduced in the Finnish paper and cell industry by 3,786 persons during 2006–2010. In October 2010 under negotiations were additional 850 jobs in plants of Kouvola (Myllykoski / UPM) and Kotka Sunila (Stora Enso).

For prevention of the global warming the emissions of the industry plant in Finland, Russia, China or Brazil are equal. The overall global carbon emission and energy use change may be small or negative when the international Finnish company move its production from Finland e.g. in Brazil or China. This information is not specified in the national emission statistics. The company specific data do not always include total worldwide company emissions. According to Worldwatch Institute the emissions have no national labels in respect to global warming. Among others Friends of the Earth have criticized Stora Enso policy in 2009 of the shift in the Eucalyptus monoculture plantations in Brazil endangering the rain forests and local farmers land ownerships.

== Traffic ==
The number of cars was in 31.12.2011 ca 3,494,400 which includes 2,978,700passenger cars. The number of vehicles increased 3.9% in 2011.

Minister of Transport / in Finland Merja Kyllönen assigned in 2013 a team led by Jorma Ollila from Royal Dutch Shell to study the future transport economics and car taxation. Working group suggested a kilometre-based car taxation. At least Greenpeace had criticized the assignment of the major oil company representative in the group leader. The group suggested decline the car investment tax which is more effective to decline the number of cars on roads than the tax of use. According to UITP higher forefront cost of the use of car reduce the oil consumption more than the higher running costs. The group also suggested the decline of petrol tax which would be more unfavorable for petrol cars compared to electric car. Electric cars are less noisy, polluting (with wind power) and have cheaper fuel than the petrol cars.

Present vehicle tax gives opportunity to promote the low emission compared to high emission cars investments. (HS 18.12.2013 A16 Tiainen)

Personal car takes 90 times the space compared to metro.

== See also ==
- Energy in Finland
