= Climate change in Finland =

Emissions, effects, and responses of Finland related to climate change

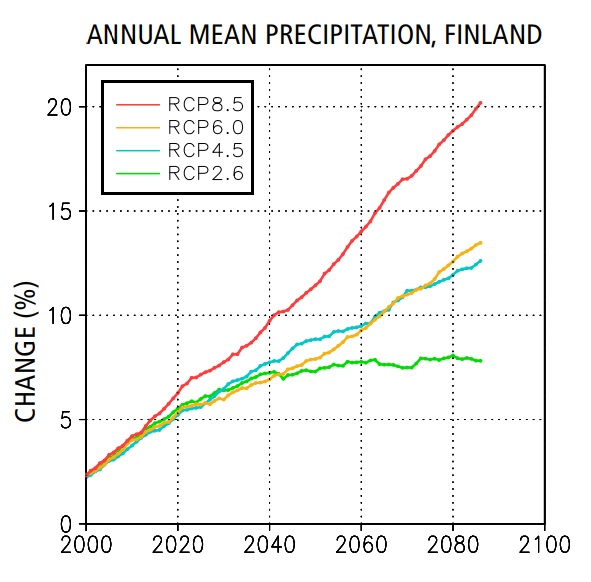
Annual mean precipitation (%) in Finland in 2000–2085 compared to the average values in 1971–2000, under different Representative Concentration Pathways scenarios.

Climate change has far-reaching consequences on the natural environment and people of Finland. Finland was among the top five greenhouse gas emitters in 2001, on a per capita basis. Emissions increased to 58.8 million tonnes in 2016. Finland needs to triple its current cuts to emissions in order to be carbon neutral by 2035. Finland relies on coal and peat for its energy, but plans to phase out coal by 2029. Finland has a target of carbon neutrality by the year 2035 without carbon credits. The policies include nature conservation, more investments in trains, changes in taxation and more sustainable wood burning. After 2035 Finland will be carbon negative, meaning soaking more carbon than emitting.

== Greenhouse gas emissions ==
=== Overview ===
==== National ====
In 2016, Finland's carbon dioxide emissions amounted to 58.8 million tonnes; 12.5 million tonnes less than the amount in 1990. However, this figure was a 6 per cent increase from 2015; nevertheless, it is still 18 per cent lower than in 1990. The largest factors explaining the growth in emissions between 2015 and 2016 were the increase in coal consumption and the decline in the proportion of biofuels used in transport. Emissions grew in some sectors. These sectors include energy, where it went up by eight per cent (or 3.3 million tonnes of CO_{2} equivalent); industrial processes, where product use increased by four per cent (or 0.3 million tonnes of CO_{2} equivalent). Emissions from agriculture grew by one per cent (or 0.04 million tonnes of CO_{2}). Emissions from transport rose by 1.5 million tonnes of CO_{2} equivalent, and from the production of electricity and heat, they rose by 1.4 million tonnes of CO_{2} equivalent.

Approximately 60% of Finland's anthropogenic methane emissions—3.17 MMTCO_{2}e—come from agriculture (manure management), municipal solid waste and natural gas and oil systems. A majority of the remainder comes from enteric fermentation.

The major changing factors for the annual emission changes were the consumption of coal and peat. In 2006 the hard coal increase was 92% subject to industry(including energy producing industry) separate electricity generation from hard coal. At the same time the controversial peat consumption was increased. The district heating used 42% of hard coal in average 1990–2006, but its annual variation was small compared to the industry separate electricity generation.

Carbon Dioxide Emissions by Fuels
	mil. t CO2		% of fossil fuels total			
Year	Biomass	Fossil	Coal	Oil	N. gas	Traffic
1990	19.3	53.0	38	31	9	22
2000	29.4	53.1	37	26	15	22
2004	32.9	64.3	45	21	14	20
2005	30.7	52.8	35	25	16	24
2006	34.5	64.1	45	20	14	20
2007	33.0	61.8	45	21	13	21
2008	33.1	53.7	39	22	15	24
Coal: Hard coal, other coal and peat Other coal: coke, blast furnace gas, coke oven gas, coal tar, and other non-specified coal Oil: Heavy fuel oil, light fuel oil and other oil Natural gas Fossil traffic fuels: motor petrol, diesel and aviation petrol Biomass: black liquor and wood Greenhouse gas emissions have been published annually in April by Statistics Finland.

Carbon Dioxide Emissions by Fuels: Coal
	mil. t CO2					% of fossil total	
	Fossil	Hard coal	Other coal	Peat	Coal total	Peat	Coal total
1990	53.0	12	3	6	20.1	10.6	37.9
2000	53.1	9	4	7	19.4	12.2	36.5
2004	64.3	16	4	9	28.7	14.5	44.6
2005	52.8	8	4	7	18.3	13.6	34.7
2006	64.1	15	4	10	28.9	15.3	45.1
2007	61.8	13	4	11	27.4	17.3	44.3
2008	53.7	9	3	9	20.7	15.8	38.5
Other coal: coke, blast furnace gas, coke oven gas, coal tar and other non-specified coal

==== Regional ====
Greenhouse gas emissions in the Helsinki region in 2017 were 5 million tn CO_{2}, including transportation, 1.4 million tn and heating, 2.6 million tn. Greenhouse gas emissions from construction in the Helsinki Region in 2017 were 2 million tn CO_{2}: more than from transportation and almost 1.5 times transportation emissions.

Year 2017 climate gas emissions compared to 1990 were in Helsinki - 24%, Espoo + 8%, Vantaa +2% and Kauniainen -9%. About 80% of emissions were from heating and transport. The summary report does not include emissions from air travel and construction nor verifies that these emissions were indifferent to climate change. The summary report does not specify domestic industry emissions abroad. E.g. Fortum's acquisition of Uniper Germany may increase this company's total emissions so meaningfully that foreign emissions affect climate change. Fortum's headquarters is in Espoo Finland.

The carbon foot print was twice as big in the new houses compared to more spacious detached house areas in 2003–2012 in Finland, In the city carbon foot print was 11.7 tn and suburb 8 tn per person.

Municipal emissions were calculated in 2020 excluding industry, construction, aviation and foreign shipping. For example, aviation was not included in evaluation. In comparison, the Swedish aviation emissions are in total approximately equal to the emissions from the Swedish passenger vehicle traffic.

=== Energy consumption ===
==== Coal and peat ====
Finland will phase-out coal in 2029, compared to 2024 in the UK, 2027 in France and 2028 in Denmark. In 2018 there was zero new installed wind power in Finland to replace coal. This was due to Sipilä government wind power policy concerned of the negative influence of wind power.

CO_{2} emissions from peat were 15% and coal and peat 39% of total fossil fuel emissions in Finland in 2006.

Peatlands are the main carbon storage and their protection is one of the main issues in climate change mitigation. Peatland drainage destroys the habitat of many species, and heavily fuels climate change. Peat is the most harmful energy source for global warming in Finland.

In conflict with the EU, IEA and IPCC reports Finnish Ministry of Trade and Industry claim that peat is renewable energy. However, it is an undisputed fact that peat is formed over 10,000 years in favourable conditions. Finland has ditched the majority of its wetlands. The Finnish peat companies have also been active abroad, in Sweden, Estonia and Indonesia. The Finnish subsidies for peat in 2007-2010 undermined the goal of reducing CO_{2} emissions and counteracted the European Union emissions trading scheme.

The director of the state-owned research institute VTT, Satu Helynen, had close connections with the peat industry in 2010. She proposed that the government should exclude carbon tax for peat in 2010. Moreover, she tried to suppress all the second opinions of her colleagues in VTT in conflict with the freedom of speech and research ethics. After this conflict came public VTT wrote new directions following: "Scientists should prevent all criticism of the content of VTT publications publicly after the publications."

Use of peat as energy and land is responsible for a third of all Finnish climate change emissions. This includes energy use, agriculture, and digging ditches. Digging ditches in peat forests is also one of the major reducers of biodiversity in Finland. According to Statistics Finland use of peat as energy created 8 million tons of CO_{2} emissions in 2018. This includes emissions from peat storage and peat production area. Digging ditches in peatland fields in Finland created 6 million tons of CO_{2} emissions annually. Digging ditches in forest lands in Finland results in 7 million tons of CO_{2} emission annually.

==== Nuclear energy ====
In the Kyoto Protocol Sweden was permitted lower emission decline targets based on nuclear power phase-out. Finnish emission cut obligations may be increased based on higher nuclear dependency.

Fortum is a half state-owned energy company. Fortum's energy strategy is large investments in nuclear energy in Finland, Sweden, and Russia. Fortum aims to invest 15 percent in a controversial Finnish nuclear power plant to be built by Rosatom, the Russian state-owned energy company. Fortum has saved no funds to invest in the new renewable energy forms. Until the end of 2014 Finnish governments have given no obligations in the new renewables for companies, industries, or municipals. Russia had the interest to build and share own a nuclear plant in Finland in 2014 during the 2014 Russian military intervention in Ukraine and 2014 Crimean crisis. Unlike Finland, most other European countries demanded to decline energy dependency from Russia.

Finland was among the top five greenhouse gas emitters in 2001: The consumption emissions per capita of greenhouse gases in 2001 of the top 5 countries were US 29 tonnes, Australia 21 tonnes, Canada 20 tonnes, Switzerland 18 tonnes and Finland 18 tonnes.

==== Transportation ====
European Union aims in 2014 demanding targets to decline emissions 40% from 1990 level to 2030. In Finnish traffic this goal demands a decline from 12.48 Mtn CO_{2} to 7.4 Mtn CO_{2}. As a linear reduction this objective is an annual decline in value of 0.30 Mtn CO_{2} from the top year emission 13.36 Mtn CO_{2} in 2010. This objective equals maximum emission levels of 12.16 Mtn CO_{2} (2014) and 11.56 Mtn CO_{2} (2016). Finnish traffic warming emissions (million tonnes CO_{2}) were:

1990 - 12.48
2008 - 13.42
2009 - 12.75
2010 - 13.36
2011 - 13.23
2012 – 12.68

In the Katainen Cabinet, minister Merja Kyllönen asked a leader of the multinational oil and gas company Royal Dutch Shell representative as head of the committee to give recommendations for the future traffic policy in Finland.

Jyrki Katainen suggested in December 2014 that the EU should fund a liquefied natural gas terminal in Finland. However, neglected initiatives in the fossil-fuel phase-out climate change challenge and ongoing 2014 United Nations Climate Change Conference.

==== Aviation ====
Aviation using fossil fuels may have large climate change emissions at an individual level. If a four-person family flies to Thailand, its climate emissions are 15 000000-20 000 kg CO_{2}. This is equal to 170 000 km with a car. In most European countries the fuel for planes is tax-free, also in Finland. Thereby Finland lost €63 million in tax revenues in 2012. Finland has supported the airfields with €20 million annually. European commercial aviation is supported by €27 billion annually. If European Union would collect 15% VAT from flights in the European Union income would be €11 billion.

Emissions of foreign flights in Finland are about equal to traffic emissions inland. The total warming effect is at least twice the one caused by carbon dioxide emissions, multiplying factor may be between 2 and 5. It is influenced by water vapor and nitrogen oxides. Car traffic is 10% of Finland's total warming emissions 6,5 million tons CO_{2}. Aviation emissions are 4 million tons multiplied with 2 gives 8 million tons CO_{2}. Aviation emissions have doubled in 20 years in Finland, Finland's aviation statistics do not report international flights emissions created abroad.

=== Industrial emissions ===
==== Dairy industry ====
In Finland, milk and cheese are consumed at 350 liters per person a year. Milk is equal to 3-4% of carbon emissions. This is equal to one air travel to Mallorca and back. One cow emits 850 liters of methane a day. 16,000 cows produce 50GWh gas which equals 5000 cars use. Climate panel demand 1/4 reduction of cows by 2035.

==== Cellulose industry ====
Finnish forest company UPM plant is a source of ecological risk in Uruguay. In May 2020, UPM confirmed that it will invest in the biggest cellulose plant in the world in Uruguay. The plant will use planted eucalyptus forests as raw material. Eucalyptus uses a lot of water and will contaminate the soil. Concerns include the risk that endemic forest areas will decline directly or indirectly because of the new eucalyptus areas and contribute to global warming.

==== Energy industry ====
Partly state-owned energy company Fortum will have a 70% share of Uniper in 2019. Uniper carbon dioxide emissions in 2018 were 59.5 million tons. However, Uniper does not report foreign-based emissions, nor does the Finish government. This distorts the emissions data and runs counter to transparency expectations.

Finland's biggest energy firm, Fortum, became the largest owner of a heavily polluting German company Uniper. Climate Action Network (CAN) Europe claimed that due to its stake in Uniper, Fortum is involved in energy production that is linked to hundreds of premature deaths annually in Europe and sets back efforts to slow climate change. Fortum become a major player in Europe's fossil fuel exit. With ca, 50% of Uniper, Fortum's total carbon footprint is bigger than that of the whole of Finland's.

In 2020 Uniper aims to open a new coal plant Datteln 4 in Germany. It was criticised by environmentalists in February 2020.

Carbon leakage in Finland include also e.g. 23% imports of electricity in 2018. and forest industry investments in South America.

==== Emissions by sector ====
Carbon dioxide emissions broken down by Finland's industrial sectors.

	1990	1995	2000	2005	2010	2013	2014	2015	2016
Emissions and removals, million tonnes CO_{2} equivalent
Emissions without LULUCF sector	71.3	71.9	70.1	69.8	75.5	63.1	58.9	55.4	58.9
Energy sector	53.6	55.3	53.8	53.7	60.2	48.3	44.5	40.9	44.2
Energy industries	19.0	24.0	22.1	22.1	30.9	22.2	21.0	17.8	19.1
Manufacturing industries and construction	13.7	12.4	12.2	11.6	10.2	8.6	7.2	6.9	7.3
Transport	12.1	11.3	12.1	12.9	12.7	12.2	11.1	11.1	12.6
Other energy	8.8	7.6	7.3	7.0	6.3	5.4	5.2	5.0	5.2
Industrial processes and products used	5.4	5.0	6.0	6.7	6.1	5.9	5.7	5.9	6.1
Industrial processes (excl. F-gases )	5.3	4.9	5.2	5.6	4.7	4.4	4.2	4.4	4.7
Consumption of F-gases	0.1	0.2	0.7	1.1	1.4	1.5	1.5	1.5	1.4
Agriculture	7.5	6.8	6.5	6.5	6.6	6.5	6.5	6.5	6.5
Waste management	4.7	4.6	3.9	2.8	2.6	2.3	2.2	2.1	2.0
Indirect CO_{2} emissions	0.2	0.1	0.1	0.1	0.1	0.1	0.1	0.1	0.1
LULUCF sector	-14.0	-13.7	-22.4	-27.7	-27.5	-27.3	-30.9	-28.8	-27.1

=== Deforestation ===
Deforestation accounts for 6% of Finland's total climate-warming emissions. Forests that are cut down for buildings, roads, and new fields total 19,000 hectares annually. The Rinne Cabinet of Prime Minister Antti Rinne aimed to tax building in forests, but no such tax was in place in August 2019.

Finnish forest management practices have resulted in significant net releases of carbon into the atmosphere from Finnish forest and mire ecosystems.

== Effects on the natural environment ==
=== Temperature and weather changes ===
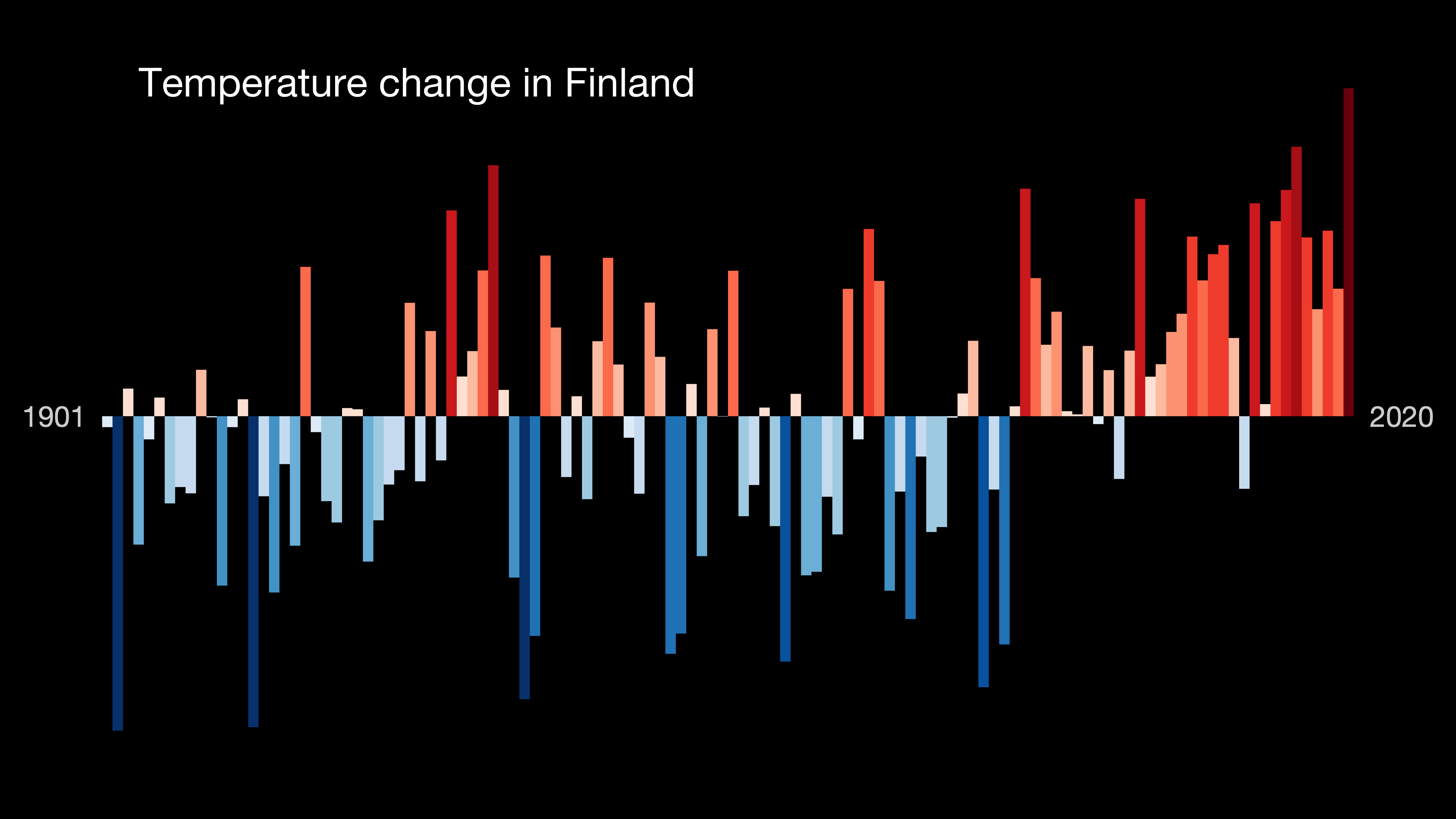
Average annual temperature anomaly in Finland, 1901 to 2020.

Between 2010 and March 2019, there were 102 days with record daily temperatures reported, clearly more than at any time in the Finnish Meteorological Institute’s (FMI) measurement history. Temperature patterns show that Finland is experiencing climate change.

Köppen climate classification map for Finland for 1980–2016

2071–2100 map under the most intense climate change scenario. Mid-range scenarios are currently considered more likely

The annual Finnish mean temperature has risen 2.3 °C since the middle of the 19th century. Warming has been greatest in early winter, nearly 5 °C. The month of July 2018 in Finland had the highest-ever temperatures recorded by the Finnish Meteorological Institute, founded in 1838. In January 2020 Finland had the mildest winter in 100 years.

==== Extreme weather events ====
Summer 2010 storms (Asta 29.-30.7 Vera 4.8, Lahja 7.8, and Sylvi 8.8) caused widespread damage. Insurance companies paid €81.6 million for the storm damages. Trees fell 9.1 million m^{3}. 480 000 persons had power line breaks, up to 6 weeks. 35 000 km of the power line was damaged. Compensation costs were over €10 million for the power customers. Other power company costs included €18 million for the repair and $4 million for extra investments. Co-operation between the responsible organisations and persons did not run effectively after the storms.

Storm Tapani hit Finland on St Stephen's Day in 2011. The previous storm of this type in Finland was Janika in November 2001. The highest momentary gust on land was 31.5 m/s. Power outages peaked on December 12, 2011, when over 300,000 homes had no electricity.

Finland had a heatwave above + 30 °C in June 2013. This occurred during the same period as the 2013 European floods.

In 2013, autumn storm Eino resulted in over 200,000 Finnish homes losing power, affecting about 10% of Finnish families. Maximum wind speed was 27.3 m/s inland and 32.9 m/s in sea.

=== Ecosystems ===
Climate change is bringing new southern species to Åland. In 2012, a fly was found that had previously been known only in England, Denmark, the Czech Republic, and Hungary.

According to climate change projections, the crucial changes in temperature will occur during the winter where the predicted warming until 2040 is 1.2-5 °C. This change in temperature will decrease the number of days where the temperature is below 0 °C and scientists predict that the date of the first frost will occur 15–30 days later than today, while the last frost day will occur 15–30 days earlier than today. The number of days with snow cover is predicted to decrease to 40–60 days at the end of the 21st century where the greatest decrease will happen in the south-western parts of Finland, compared to today's annual number of 120 (in southern Finland) - 240 (in northern Finland) days with snow cover. The winter precipitation is predicted to increase, which in short term may lead to increasing levels of snow in the northern and central parts of Finland, but long term, it might lead to a diminished snow cover in the entire country.

== Effects on people ==
=== Economic effects ===
==== Tourism ====
Finland, and especially the northern rural parts of the country, has a variety of nature-based tourism attractions, such as downhill skiing, snowmobiling, and dog sledding. Since the 1980s, Christmas tourism has emerged in Finnish Lapland. Lapland's image as a winter wonderland tourist destination has created job opportunities, but also means that the success of its tourist industry is dependent on cold temperatures and snow. The revenue of the Finnish tourism industry was 16,2 billion USD in 2015, and is expected to reach US$18.6 billion in 2020. About 97% of the Finnish population takes part in recreational activities, and about 40% participates in nature-based tourism.

With warmer temperatures, winter precipitation may fall as rain to a greater extent than at present day, which could decrease the snow cover depth and lead to icy surfaces, hindering movement and changing the aesthetics of the landscape. A decrease in snow and ice and changes in the quality of the snow is considered a threat for many nature-based tourism activities, but a shorter winter season is, however, not a threat for all entrepreneurs, such as those arranging downhill skiing. The entrepreneurs arranging snowmobiling and dog sledding, are considered vulnerable since their activities require large areas and plenty of snow. The concept of Finland is a winter wonderland and the home of Santa Claus means that entrepreneurs depend on snowy landscapes, building great expectations among tourists. A change in snow quality and a delay in the season where snow is abundant may lead to a decrease in the number of tourists.

=== Effects on housing ===
Population growth in the biggest Finnish cities from 1990 to 2017 was: Espoo 62%, Oulu 48%, Vantaa 44% Tampere 34%, and Helsinki >31 %. Total population growth in all of Finland during this time span has been less than 10%. However, the effects on housing are clear. There are empty houses in Finland's smaller cities, but more and more new houses are being built in the big cities.

== Mitigation and adaptation ==
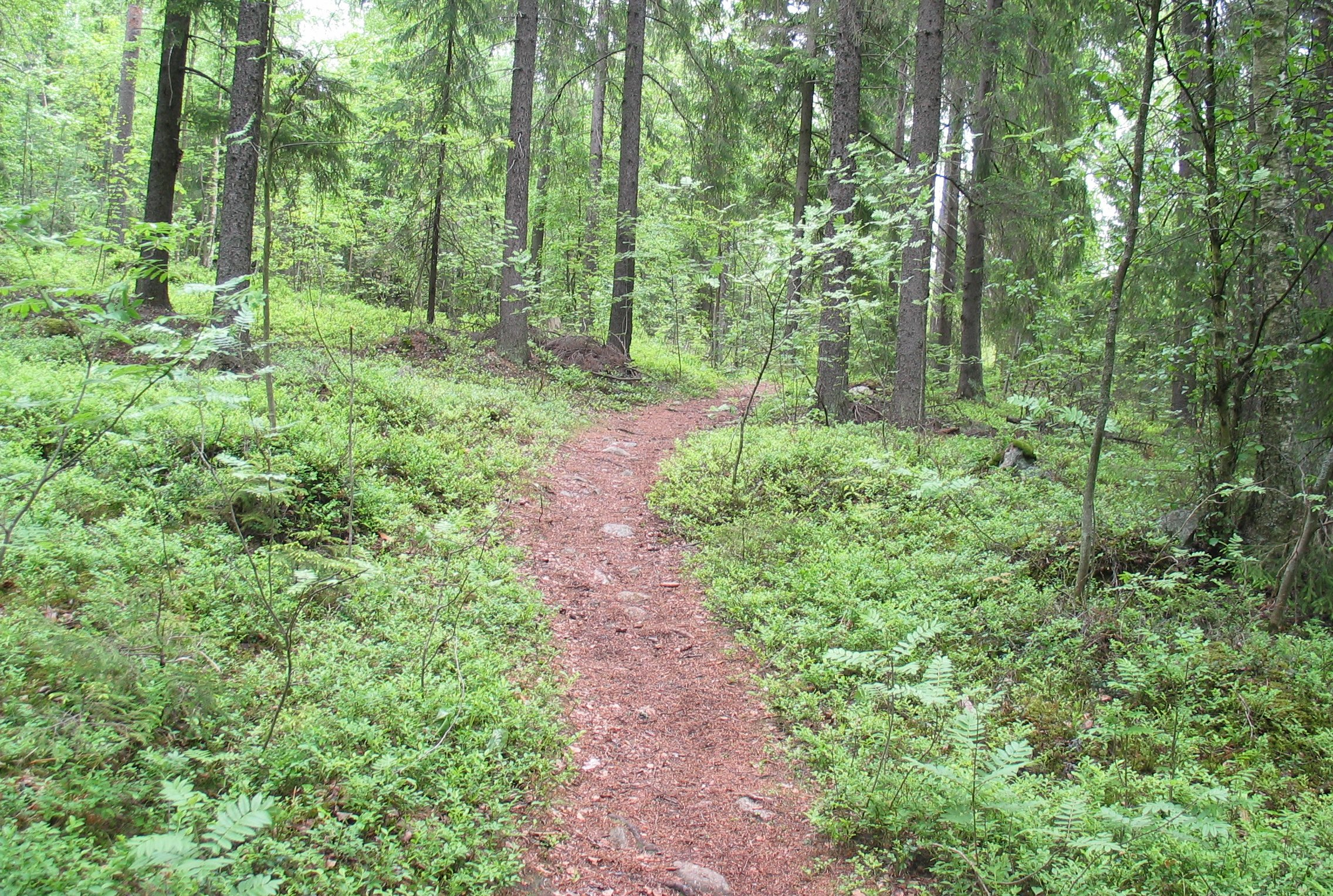
Renewable energy in Finland is mainly based on bioenergy from the forests and water power.

=== Policies and legislation ===
==== Paris agreement ====
The Paris Agreement is a legally international agreement adopted at the COP 21, its main goal is to limit global warming to below 1.5 degrees Celsius, compared to pre-industrial levels. The Nationally Determined Contributions (NDC's) are the plans to fight climate change adapted for each country. Every party in the agreement has different goals based on its own historical climate records and country's circumstances. All the goals for each country are stated in their NDCs. In the case of member countries of the European Union the goals are very similar and the European Union work with a common strategy within the Paris agreement.

=== Climate change strategy ===
As a member of the EU, Finland is bound by EU directives, including the Kyoto Protocol and the EU goal established during the 2014 United Nations Climate Change Conference. This calls for a legally binding 40% drop in emissions by 2030, using 1990 levels of carbon output as the baseline. The Finnish government accepts that human-induced greenhouse gases cause global warming. Despite this, the use of peat as an energy source has received financial support from the Finnish government since the mid-2000s. Although the Polluter Pays Principle (PPP) is embedded in Finnish and European Union environmental policy, its implementation in relation to peat production and other environmentally harmful subsidies has been the subject of criticism.

Finland completed a national renewable energy program in 1999. It was accepted as the national climate strategy in 2001. It included targets for renewable energy but no limit on the use of fossil and nuclear energy. The target is comparable to the EU Directive 2001/77/EU, which also promoted the use of renewable energy for electricity production.

Published in February 2003 was a government-ordered evaluation report from the Electrowatt-Ekono Oy, part of Pöyry. Pöyry is a national and international company that consults with the forest industry and works toward development. According to the report, Finland's national target was to increase during 1995-2010:

- Renewables of primary energy +36 TWh (achieved 1995-2001: 17 TWh)
- Renewables of electricity +8,35 TWh (achieved 1995-2001: 3,1 TWh)

By fuel:

- Bioenergy +33 TWh (achieved 1995-2001 16 TWh)
- Bioelectricity +6,2 TWh (achieved 1995–2001: 2,8 TWh)
- Hydropower +1 TWh (achieved 1995–2010, 23 TWh)
- Wind power +1.1 TWh (494 MW) (achieved 1995-2001 59 GWh 32 MW)
- Solar energy 50 GWh warming 50 GWh electricity 40 MW capacity (achieved 1995-2001 2 GWh 1 GWh 1,5 MW)
- Heat pumps 1 TWh (achieved 1995-2001 250 GWh)

=== National Climate Change Adaptation Plan 2022 ===
Finland implemented the National Climate Change Adaptation Plan for 2022 which aims to handle the risks associated with climate change and adapt to the changing climate for Finnish society. The goals of the plan are: A) Adaptation must be integrated into the planning and activities in different sectors and their stakeholders; B) Stakeholders need to have access to climate change assessment and management methods and C) Research and development, communication, and education must improve the adaptive capacity of the society, develop innovative solutions and improv citizens’ awareness of climate change adaptation. The aim of the National Climate Change Adaptation Plan is to establish measures for adaptation to climate change until 2022. The National Climate Change Adaptation Plan implements the EU Strategy on Adaptation to Climate Change within Finland.

The region of Uusimaa set a target of achieving zero carbon emissions by 2050 but has seen no decline in emissions since 2007. Lohja, Raseborg, Siuntio and Hanko set targets to reduce emissions 80% from 2007 to 2030.

==== Carbon neutrality ====
In 2019 Finland's government is committed to carbon neutrality by 2035 and to become carbon negative soon after that. Each Parliament of Finland is elected for four years period. On average Finland's climate target imply a 25% carbon emission decline in each sector during each parliament period.

In 2017 Espoo set goal to coal free Espoo in 2030.

Carbon neutrality will have consequences in taxes: Finnish state collects significant taxes from fossil fuel traffic: State vehicle taxes in 2018 were in total €8,100 million including (millions round up or down): new vehicle 1,000, vehicle in traffic €1,200, fuels €2,700, VAT fuel €1,200, VAT new vehicle €900, VAT vehicle reparation €800 and tax insurances €400. Methane and liquefied petroleum gas have no fuel tax. Commercial aviation has no fuel tax. Private aviation has no fuel tax. Commercial ships have no fuel tax.

==== Carbon sequestration ====
Carbon sequestration is equally important to decrease carbon emissions. In 2018, WWF recommended increased forest conservation in Finland, especially the prevention of the use of old-growth forests for energy generation. Forests in Finland bind carbon in soil twice as much as forest trees. Finnish agriculture emits soil carbon dioxide 37 million tonnes annually compared to 12 million tonnes CO_{2} from traffic in 2017.

==== Public transportation ====
The population of the three biggest cities in the metropolitan capital area was 21% of the total population of Finland in 2018: Helsinki 650,000, Espoo 285 000, and Vantaa 230 000. As passages volumes in 2018 free local collective traffic would cost annually in Helsinki €215 million, In Espoo €215 million and in Vantaa €215 million. Helsinki local traffic aims to have at least half of the busses electric in 2030 and 400 electric busses in 2025.

==== Aviation ====
There was 26 million aviation travels in Finland in 2019. The number increased 4% compared to 2018. Airports include at least Helsinki-Vantaa, Turku, Rovaniemi, Oulu and Tampere. In 2018 population was 5,518 million people. This makes approximately in average 4.71 air travels per citizen in Finland in 2019.

Citizens' initiative to aviation tax was made in February 2020.

==== Construction ====
Greenhouse gas emissions of construction were not taxed in Finland in January 2020.

== Society and culture ==
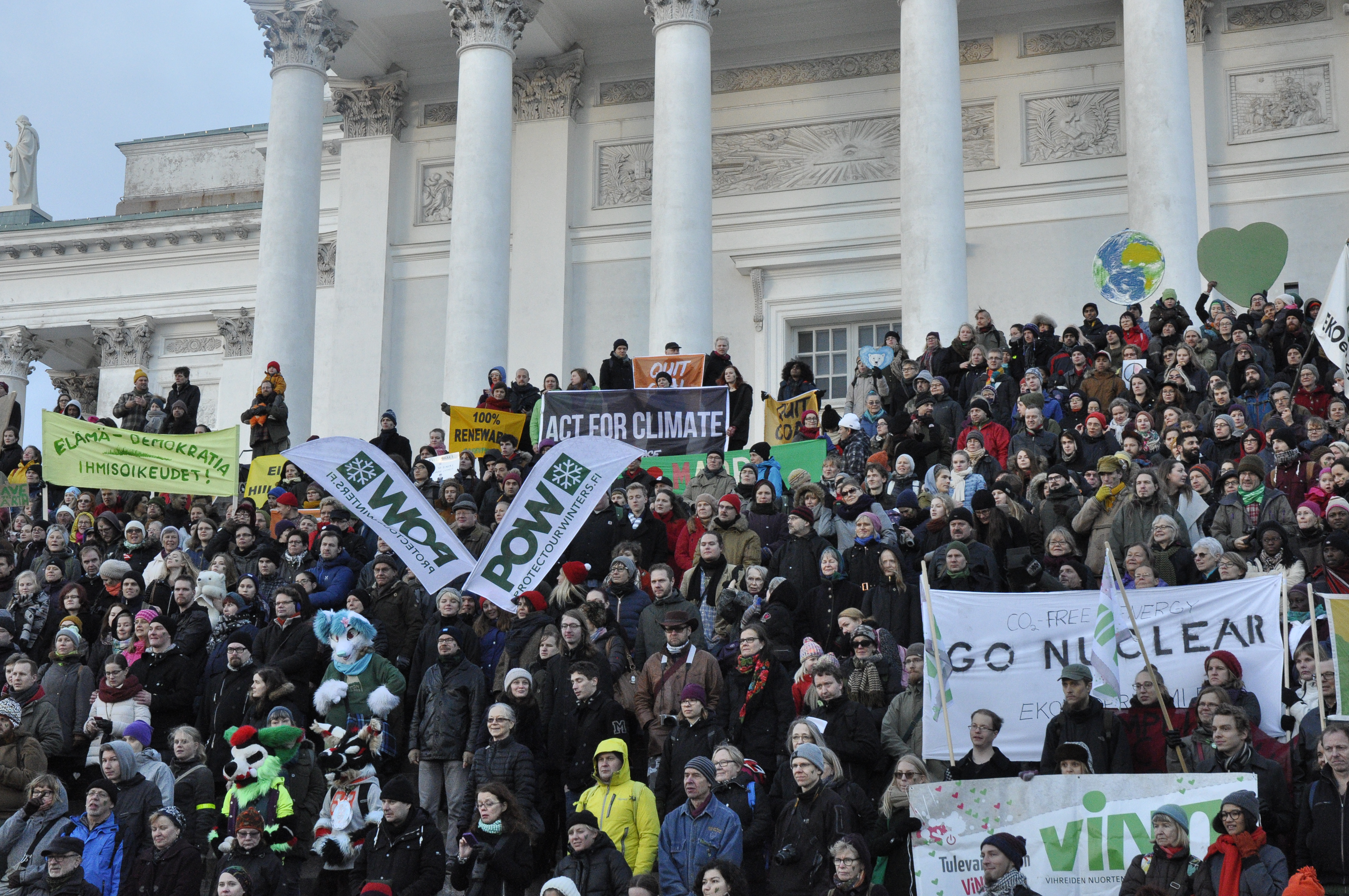
2015 People's Climate March in Helsinki.

Police estimate that 10,000 people attended the April 2019 climate peace march in Helsinki. In January 2020 99% of Finns said action must be taken to stop climate change.

== See also ==
- Regional effects of global warming
- Plug-in electric vehicles in Finland
