= Electricity sector in Finland =

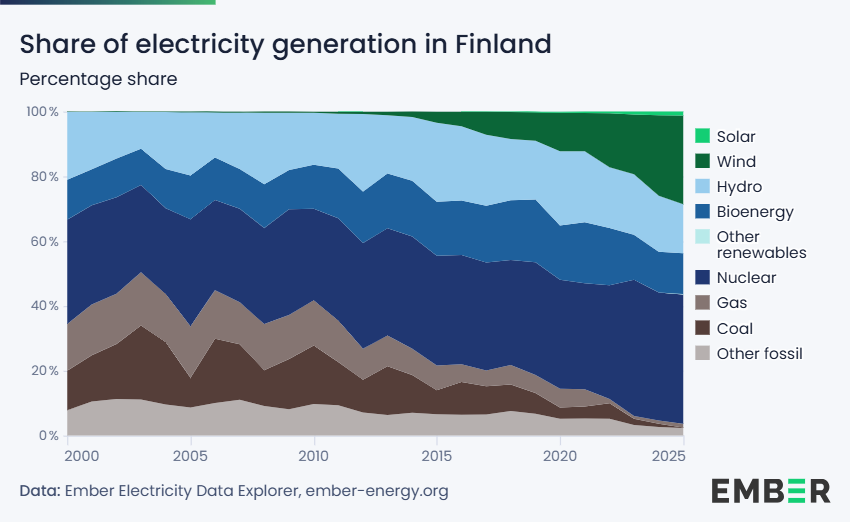
Share of electricity generation in Finland - percentage share

Finland electricity by mode of production 2024
1. Hydro (17.0%)
2. Wind (24.4%)
3. Solar (1.10%)
4. Nuclear (37.5%)
5. Wood (11.2%)
6. Imports (3.80%)
7. Coal (1.00%)
8. Oil (0.30%)
9. Gas (0.90%)
10. Peat (0.80%)
11. Other (2.10%)

The electricity sector in Finland relies on nuclear power, renewable energy, cogeneration and electricity import from neighboring countries. Finland has the highest per-capita electricity consumption in the EU. Co-generation of heat and electricity for industry process heat and district heating is common. Finland is one of the last countries in the world still burning peat.

As part of the energy transition Finland has been replacing electricity generation from fossil fuels with nuclear power and renewables. Wind power in particular has grown to be a significant part of electricity generation. A fifth nuclear reactor, Olkiluoto 3 was commissioned in 2023 and increased nuclear power generation by over 50%.

Finland is part of the synchronous grid of Northern Europe.

== Consumption and import ==
Industry was the majority consumer of electricity between 1990 and 2005 with 52–54% of total consumption. The forest industry alone consumed 30–32%.

Between 2000 and 2006, up to 7 TWh per year was imported from Sweden and up to 11.5 TWh from Russia. Net imports during this time varied between 7 TWh to Sweden and 7 TWh from Sweden, and 4 to 11 TWh from Russia. Since 2007, some electricity has also been imported from Estonia.

In 2012, most of the imports were from Sweden (14.4 TWh net import) with Russia also contributing to the net imbalance (4.4 TWh import only), while exports to Estonia were larger than imports (1.1 TWh net export).

Since Russia has begun the invasion of Ukraine on 24 February 2022, imports from Russia ended. Yearly net import was down 5 TWh as a result.

Since May 2023, Unit 3 of the Olkiluoto Nuclear Power Plant is producing electricity, up to 14 TWh per year. In 2024, only 3.8 % of the consumed electricity was imported.

Electricity in Finland TWh
Year	Consumption	Production	Net import
2000	79	67	12
2001	81	71	10
2002	84	72	12
2003	85	80	5
2004	87	82	5
2005	85	68	17
2006	90	79	11
2007	90	78	13
2008	87	74	13
2009	81	69	12
2010	88	77	11
2011	84	70	14
2012	85	67	17
2013	84	68	16
2014	83	65	18
2015	82	67	16
2016	85	66	19
2017	85	65	20
2018	87	68	20
2019	86	66	20
2020	82	67	15
2021	87	69	18
2022	82	69	13
2022	82	69	13
2023	80	78	2
2024^{*}	83	80	3

Preliminary data

== Capacity ==
As of 2023, the total capacity of power generation in Finland is 19.7 GW. However, not all of that is available at the same time and an increasing amount is intermittent generation, mostly from wind power (see below). Grid batteries are being installed, such as the 60 MWh Simojoki BESS.

The national grid operator Fingrid, together with TSOs from other Nordic countries, produces yearly estimates about the availability of power in the winter demand peak. In 2019–2020 they estimated a peak Finnish demand of 15.3 GW, during which Finland would have 11.9 GW of production capacity, not including capacity reserves. That would have meant a shortfall of 3.4 GW to be imported from neighbors. Due to a mild winter and industrial strikes the actual demand peak was only 12.4 GW and availability was never in question. No capacity reserve was activated.

In 2022–23, with imports from Russia ended, there were concerns about availability while Olkiluoto 3 was still in testing. Fingrid created a voluntary support mechanism of 500 MW of demand response, which did not need to be called upon. For 2023–24, the Energy Authority found that no capacity reserve was needed with OL3 in operation.

== Mode of production ==
Electricity by mode of production (%)
Year	Hydro	Wind	Solar	Nuclear	Coal	Oil	Gas	Peat	Wood	Other	Imports
2005	15.9%	0.2%	0.0%	26.4%	7.2%	0.5%	12.9%	5.0%	10.3%	1.7%	20.1%
2006	12.6%	0.2%	0.0%	24.4%	16.9%	0.5%	13.3%	6.9%	11.1%	1.5%	12.7%
2007	15.5%	0.2%	0.0%	24.9%	14.4%	0.5%	11.3%	7.7%	10.1%	1.7%	13.9%
2008	19.4%	0.3%	0.0%	25.3%	9.1%	0.7%	12.3%	5.6%	10.9%	1.8%	14.6%
2009	15.5%	0.3%	0.0%	27.8%	12.8%	0.6%	11.8%	5.1%	9.7%	1.6%	14.9%
2010	14.5%	0.3%	0.0%	25.0%	15.5%	0.5%	12.5%	6.7%	11.4%	1.6%	12.0%
2011	14.6%	0.6%	0.0%	26.4%	10.8%	0.5%	10.9%	6.0%	12.0%	1.8%	16.4%
2012	19.6%	0.6%	0.0%	25.9%	7.8%	0.3%	7.7%	4.0%	11.8%	1.8%	20.5%
2013	15.1%	0.9%	0.0%	27.0%	11.9%	0.2%	7.9%	3.5%	12.8%	2.0%	18.7%
2014	15.9%	1.3%	0.0%	27.1%	8.9%	0.2%	6.5%	3.8%	12.6%	2.0%	21.5%
2015	20.1%	2.8%	0.0%	27.1%	5.8%	0.2%	6.2%	3.5%	12.3%	2.2%	19.8%
2016	18.4%	3.6%	0.0%	26.2%	7.7%	0.2%	4.3%	3.2%	12.0%	2.3%	22.3%
2017	17.1%	5.6%	0.1%	25.2%	6.5%	0.2%	3.8%	3.0%	12.3%	2.2%	23.9%
2018	15.0%	6.7%	0.1%	25.0%	6.2%	0.3%	4.7%	3.7%	12.7%	2.8%	22.8%
2019	14.2%	7.0%	0.2%	26.6%	4.8%	0.3%	4.4%	3.3%	13.5%	2.5%	23.3%
2020	19.2%	9.7%	0.3%	27.4%	2.8%	0.2%	4.8%	2.4%	12.6%	2.2%	18.5%
2021	17.9%	9.4%	0.3%	26.0%	2.9%	0.2%	4.3%	2.2%	13.9%	2.2%	20.4%
2022	16.3%	14.1%	0.5%	29.7%	4.0%	0.3%	1.1%	2.5%	13.9%	2.3%	15.3%
2023	18.8%	18.1%	0.9%	41.0%	1.9%	0.3%	0.8%	1.3%	12.7%	2.3%	2.2%
2024	17.0%	24.4%	1.1%	37.5%	1.0%	0.3%	0.9%	0.8%	11.2%	2.1%	3.8%

=== Fossil fuels ===
Except for peat, which is variously classed as either a fossil fuel or a slow-renewable fuel, Finland imports all the fossil fuels used for electricity production. Coal and natural gas account for most of the production, with some oil generators acting mostly as reserve. The use of fossil fuels has fallen from highs over 30% in 2003–2004 to 20% or below in 2012–2014. By 2020 the share was closer to 10%. This is largely a consequence of cheap imported electricity, although domestic renewables have also increased in their share of production.

In 2019 the parliament passed a law to ban the use of coal for energy production by May 1, 2029. As of 2021 there are no plans to ban other fossil fuels. Despite popular support for banning the use of peat, there is only a commitment to halve its use by 2030. However, it is estimated that market forces will reduce peat's energy use to a third of its 2019 level by 2025.

=== Nuclear power ===
Nuclear power plants in Finland (view)
Active plants
Unfinished plants

As of 2024, Finland has five operating nuclear reactors in two power plants, all located on the shores of the Baltic Sea. Nuclear power provided about 40% of the country's electricity generation in 2024. The first research nuclear reactor in Finland was commissioned in 1962 and the first commercial reactor started operation in 1977. The fifth reactor (Olkiluoto Unit 3) started operation in April 2023.

Finland's nuclear reactors are among the world's most productive, with an average capacity factor of 95% in the 2010s.

=== Renewable energy ===
Between 2005 and 2014, Finland produced 25–30% of electricity as a percentage of demand from renewable energy. The largest source was hydropower (15–20%) which fluctuates yearly depending on rainfall, causing the share of renewable generation to also vary. Other major renewable sources were wood-based energy resources like black liquor from the forest industry, accounting for approximately 12% on average.

In recent years wind power (see below) has grown to surpass hydro and renewable electricity altogether has reached 50% of demand. Solar power has also started to contribute.

=== Wind power ===
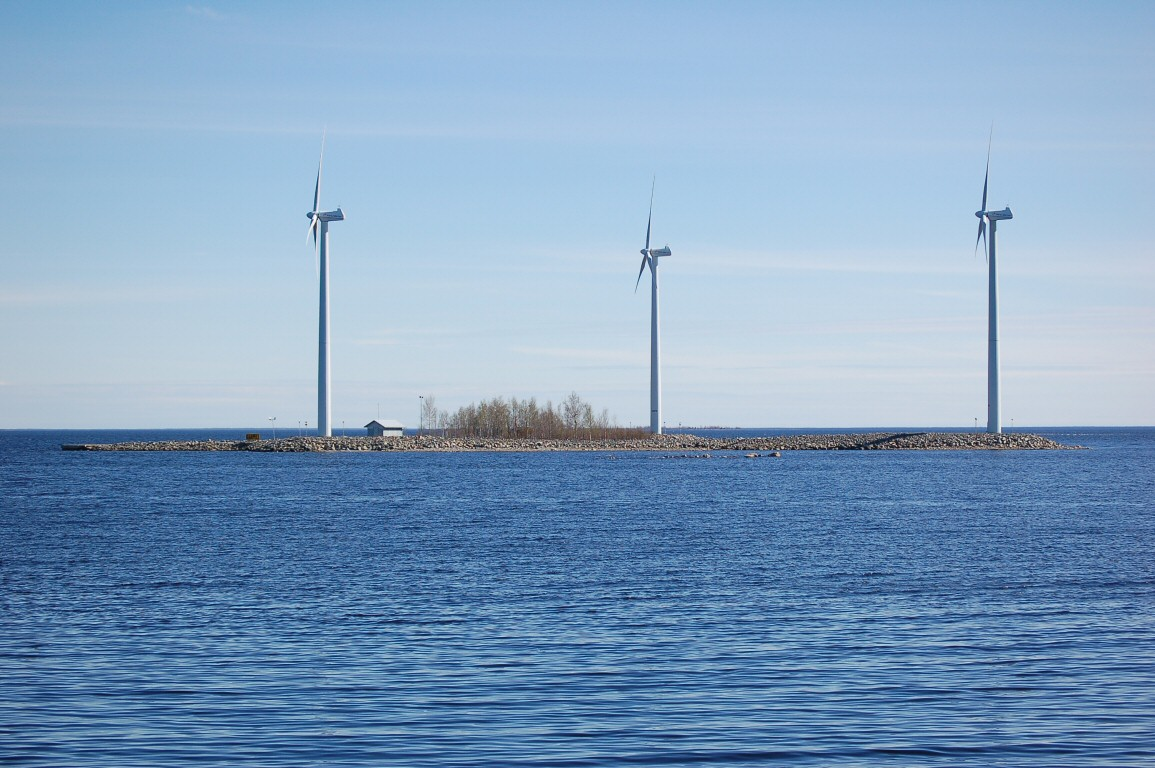
Wind farm in Ii, Finland

Wind power in Finland has been the fastest growing source of electricity in recent years. In 2024, Finland covered 24% of the yearly electricity demand with wind power production, which was 25% of domestic production. Wind capacity was up 20% from the previous year and wind production up 37%. This compares to an average wind power share of 19% in the EU.

By the end of 2022, Finland's wind power capacity reached 5,677 MW with 1,393 turbines installed. That year, wind power production increased by 41% to 11.6 TWh, representing 14.1% of the country's electricity consumption. This growth positioned wind power as the country's third largest electricity source. In 2024 wind surpassed hydropower to become the second largest source behind only nuclear power.

According to a 2018 study done by VTT Technical Research Centre of Finland, published in Nature Energy, new wind power technology could cover the entire electricity consumption (86 TWh) of Finland.

Wind power is one of the most popular energy resources among the Finnish public. In 2022 82% of respondents wanted more wind power, which was second only to solar with 90%. Previous results include 90% in September 2007 and 88% in April 2005. In the Pori area of Finland 97% of people supported wind power according to Suomen Hyötytuuli Oy in 2000.

== Companies ==
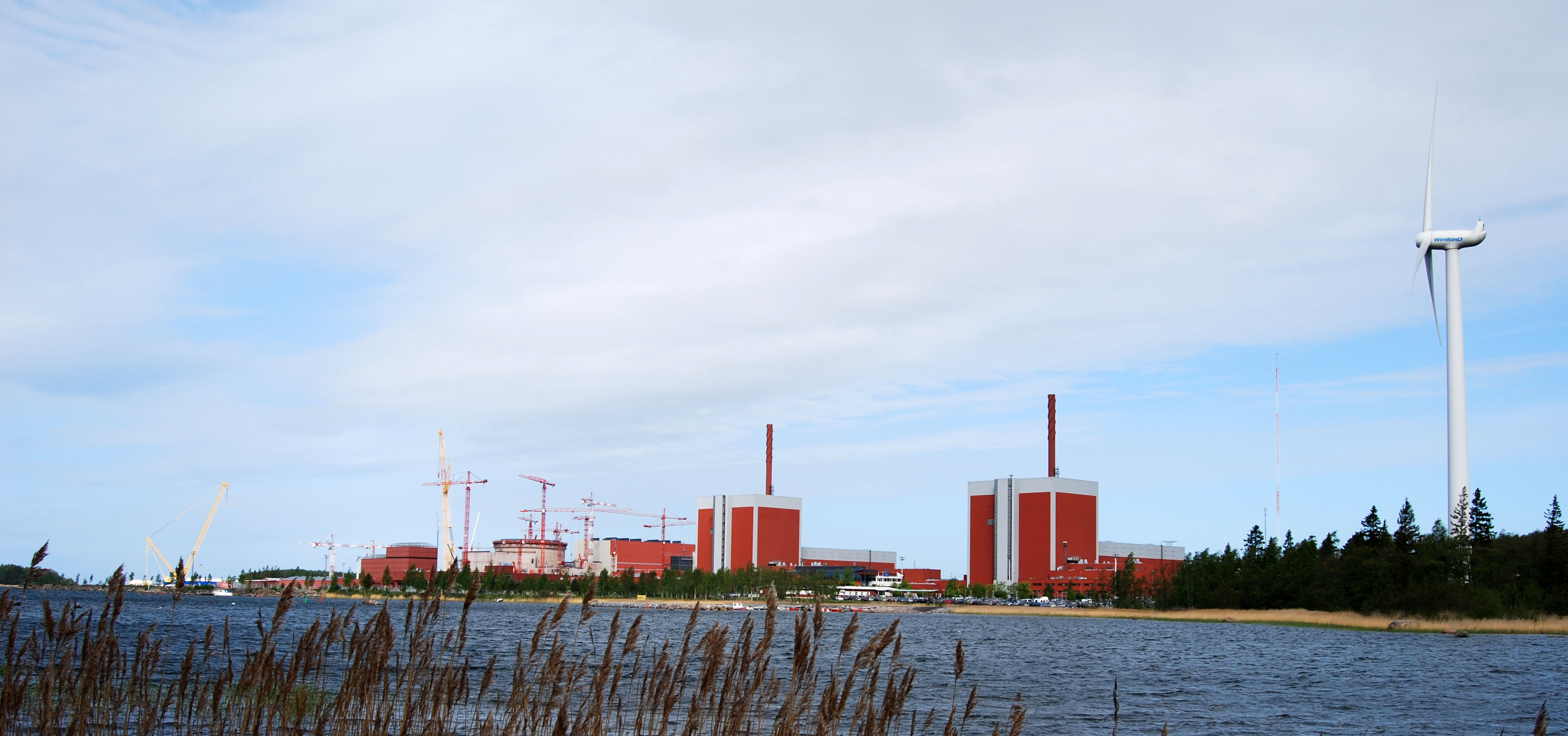
Nuclear power in Finland is a major source of electricity. Teollisuuden Voima operates three reactors in Olkiluoto.

=== Production ===
Major producers in Finland include: Fortum, Pohjolan Voima, Teollisuuden Voima and Helsingin Energia.

=== Market ===
Nord Pool Spot is the shared power market for Finland and nearby countries.

=== Transmission ===
Fingrid Oyj is a Finnish national electricity transmission grid operator.

=== Distribution ===
Major distributors are: Helen Oy, Caruna and Elenia. Other companies are Savon Voima (Savo), Pohjois-Karjalan Sähkö (Northern Karelia, Järvi-Suomen Energia (Central Finland), Kymenlaakson Sähkö (Kymenlaakso) and Loiste (Kajaani and Sotkamo).

Caruna in the south of Finland is owned mostly (80%) by Australian and Dutch holding and property companies. In 2017 Caruna's turn-over was €145 million and state tax rate 4% (€6 million). In 2017 Caruna paid its stakeholders 8.17% interest (77 million) while market loans were 1.5–3% interest. Company interest cost were reduced from the taxable income based on Sipilä Cabinet taxation rules.

== Politics ==
In 2016 there has been renewed discussion about Finland's energy policy. Finland imports over 20% of the electricity used at peak usage. For example, in the hour between 17 and 18 on January 7, 2016, during a period of extreme cold, Finland imported 4,300 MW (28.5%) out of a record 15,100 MW of total usage (average over 1 hour). Multiple delays in the construction of the third reactor at the Olkiluoto Nuclear Power Plant (1,600 MW) exacerbated the domestic energy production deficit, until finally starting regular production in April 2023. A consortium of Finnish industry and power companies called Fennovoima has applied and been granted a permission to build another new nuclear power plant, delivered by Russia's Rosatom, which also has a 1/3 stake on the power plant. This has caused some concern among observers about Russia being able to manipulate Nordic electricity prices or use the power plant as a leverage in conflict situations. The plant was estimated to be operational by 2024 and projected to produce 1,200 MW of electricity, but all work was stopped in 2022 due to the Russian invasion of Ukraine.

The Finnish Security Intelligence Service (Supo) indicated in 2016 that foreign intelligence activity in Finland was aimed at influencing decision-making in energy policy.

== See also ==
- Energy in Finland
- Nordic energy market
- Economy of Finland
