= List of European power companies by carbon intensity =

The following is a list of European power companies by carbon intensity.

== List ==
Country	Company	Production 2002	Emission 2002	CO_{2}/MWh 2002	Production 2003	Emission 2003	CO_{2}/MWh 2003	Production 2004	Emission 2004	CO_{2}/MWh 2004	Production 2005	Emission 2005	CO_{2}/MWh 2005	Production 2006	Emission 2006	CO_{2}/MWh 2006	Production 2007	Emission 2007	CO_{2}/MWh 2007	Production 2008	Emission 2008	CO_{2}/MWh 2008	Production 2009	Emission 2009	CO_{2}/MWh 2009
(France) / (United Kingdom) / (Italy) /All	EDF Group	650	91.35	141	669	96.34	144	647	95.74	148	647	93.52	145	655	93.35	142	706	101.91	144	704	103.79	147	652	88.09	135
(United Kingdom)	EDF Energy	20	15.8	772	23	17.5	776	25	20.5	812	23	18.5	807	25	20.8	818	26	21.1	826	27	21.9	805	72	23.8	330
(Italy)	Edison S.p.A.	56	35.1	624	57	35.1	613	61	35.6	583	56	33.6	597	64	34.9	542	66	34.8	531	63	32.4	514	61	29.9	495
All/ (United Kingdom)	RWE Group	184	135.5	738	179	140.5	787	183	139.1	761	182	142.7	784	185	142.4	771	173	147.06	848	194	144.46	747	169	133.7	792
(Germany)	EnBW	65	16.8	258	75	20.9	277	73	19.2	263	74	17.8	242	75	18.1	241	74	17.7	241	67	17.0	254	66	15.9	241
(United Kingdom)	NPower	35	21.5	623	38	27.5	726	34	23.1	681	33	22.7	680	37	24.7	677	34	22	651	38	25	665	27	16.6	622
Eastern/Central/Northern Europe/ (United Kingdom) / (France)	E.ON Group	216	91.78	425	186	93.83	504	245	101.39	413	229	101.17	442	221	100.8	456	247	106.04	429	239	100.07	418	216	84.7	393
(Italy) / (Spain) / (Portugal)	Enel Group	228	120.4	529	232	115.51	499	222	111.92	514	206	106.52	528	193	92.99	495	185	92.25	498	186	83	447	170	77.29	454
(Spain)	Endesa	91	45.4	500	94	44	470	96	48.5	607	94	50.3	538	89	44.5	501	91	45.5	500	101	38.5	282			
(Portugal) / (Spain)	EDP Group	39	26.9	690	43	23.25	536	39	23.89	614	42	28.26	677	43	24.48	565	43	23.42	544	40	19.78	500	42	20.01	477
(Sweden) /All/ (United Kingdom)	Vattenfall	166	68.28	411	160	71.47	448	174	69.97	403	175	71.77	410	165	74.5	450	184	84.5	459	178	81.72	459	175	79.05	452
(Netherlands)	Nuon							18	14.7	837	19	15	799	16	13.9	849	14	11.7	851	17	14.9	856			
Europe	GDF Suez Europe	115	44.48	387	130	41.59	320	125	40.83	327	123	39.36	319	129	40.4	314	148	50.52	341	145	47.58	327	141	45.44	322
(Spain) / (United Kingdom)	Iberdrola + Scottish Power	56	13.55	242	64	7.47	117	66	11.9	179	88	29.65	338	95	28.16	297	84	24.72	294	94	27.21	289	92	25.55	279
(Czech Republic)	CEZ	54	34.7	643	61	34	557	62	35.71	575	60	33.3	555	66	36.26	553	73	46.85	640	68	40.38	597	65	37.2	569
(Greece)	PPC	49	51.35	1050	52	52.41	1004	53	53.29	1015	53	52.59	994	52	50.48	969	54	53.04	984	52	52.2	996	50	49.7	992
(Finland)	Fortum	48	7	146	53	9.14	172	56	7.93	143	52	1.99	38	54	5.82	107	52	3.34	64	53	2.16	41	49	2.02	41
(Norway) / (Sweden) / (Finland)	Statkraft	49	0	0	42	0	0	34	0	0	49	0	0	46	0	0	45	0.23	5	53	1.6	30	57	1.6	28
(United Kingdom)	Scottish & Southern	19	9.35	487	23	12.24	531	23	12.18	524	39	18.9	486	41	25.21	622	47	25.88	555	46	22.72	496	39	19.3	491
(Spain)	Unión Fenosa	24	16.38	683	26	15.1	584	27	16.54	612	29	16.49	572	31	15.82	514	34	18.2	535	18	7.26	398	29	9.48	330
(Austria)	Verbund	35	3.65	105	28	5	178	30	4.44	149	29	3.81	131	28	3.7	132	28	3.41	120	29	2.89	101	30	2.21	74
(United Kingdom)	Drax	19	16.35	840	26	21.64	833	25	20.52	838	25	20.52	830	27	22.76	840	27	22.5	844	27	22.3	818	24	19.85	815
(Denmark)	Dong	30	17.53	584	36	21.47	591	29	15.77	552	29	15.77	552	26	11.87	464	20	8.55	432	19	7.43	401	18	6.93	383
(Finland) / (Sweden)	PVO	16	6	375	18	6.07	337	18	4.95	280	13	1.67	126	18	4.73	264	17	4.25	250	22	2.92	131	22	2.88	131

== Units ==
- Production – TWh
- Emission – Mt CO_{2}
- CO_{2}/MWh – kg

== See also ==
- Fuel mix disclosure

== Sources ==
- https://web.archive.org/web/20120308230538/http://www.pwc.fr/assets/files/pdf/2010/11/pwc_ad_carbon_factor_uk_11_2010_v2.pdf
- https://web.archive.org/web/20120323180737/http://www.pwc.fr/assets/files/pdf/2008/12/pwc_carbon_factor_2008_uk.pdf
