= Caruna =

Finnish electrical grid enterprise

Caruna Networks Oy
- Company type: Limited liability company
- Founded: 2000
- Headquarters: Espoo
- Key people: Chief Executive Officer Jyrki Tammivuori; Chairman Matti Ruotsala
- Owner: KKR(40%); OTPP (40%); AMF (12,5%); Elo (7,5%)
- Number of employees: 259 (end of year 2022)

Caruna distributes electricity and maintains, repairs and builds a weatherproof electricity network for its 700,000 customers in the Southern, Southwestern and Western Finland, as well as in the city of Joensuu, the sub-region of Koillismaa, and Satakunta. In addition to households, its customer base in 2021 included approximately 80 municipalities and about 90,000 companies.

Caruna is responsible for about a fifth of Finland's electricity distribution. The CEO is Jyrki Tammivuori.

== History ==
=== Lounais-Suomen Sähkö ===
The name Caruna comes from the municipality of Karuna, where Lounais-Suomen Sähkö (originally named Karunan—Sauvon Sähköosakeyhtiö) was founded in 1912. The company's founders were local manor owners Eliel Blomqvist, Otto Rotkirch, Wäinö Sovelius, Gustaf Schauman, Johan Oskar Sjöstedt, J. Peurakoski, and merchant A. Karlsson, who established the electricity company for their own needs.

The first major project was the harnessing of three rapids on the Paimionjoki river.

After the 1960s, more than 15 local electricity utilities were merged into Lounais-Suomen Sähkö.

=== Länsivoima ===
In 1995, the company's operations had expanded beyond its original area, and its name was changed to Länsivoima. Later, the company became an active player in the electricity market and became known for acquiring other electricity companies. Ultimately, however, Länsivoima was itself acquired. Imatran Voima first bought a third of it and gradually acquired a majority stake in the company.

=== Fortum Sähkönsiirto ===
Länsivoima ceased to exist as an independent company in 2000 when it was merged into its parent company, which had become Fortum. It operated as Fortum's electricity distribution unit for just under 15 years.

=== Caruna ===
Caruna began as an independent company when Fortum divested its Finnish electricity distribution business in 2014. The current owners are domestic and international pension investors, with ownership stakes as follows: KKR (40%), Ontario Teachers' Pension Plan (40%), the Swedish pension insurance company AMF (12.5%), and Elo (7.5%).

== Organization ==
Caruna includes two separate network companies. Caruna Espoo Oy operates in urban areas with a high cabling rate and a high number of customers to share the expenses per metres of network. Caruna Oy operates mainly in rural, sparsely populated, areas where their amount of network to be maintained, built and repaired is high. The length of the network is 168 metres per customer in Caruna Oy's area. In Caruna Espoo Oy's area, the corresponding number is 36 metres per customer.

Caruna was founded in 2014, but its story really began in 1912 in a place called Karuna where a new electricity company started out. Caruna has approximately 300 employees and contracts 1,000 additional workers across Finland. Caruna's operations are regulated by the Finnish Energy Authority, in charge of monitoring the electricity network business in Finland.

Caruna is owned by Finnish employment pension companies Elo (7.5%), as well as international infrastructure investors KKR (40%), OTPP (40%) and AMF (12,5%).

== Electricity network ==
The length of electricity network in total is 87,370 kilometres (54,290 mi).

In 2019, a total of 3,800 kilometres (2,400 mi) of electricity network was placed underground, where it is protected from the fluctuating weather conditions. The cabling rate is 56 per cent of the network. In 2019, the company distributed electricity to its customers with a reliability rate of 99.99 per cent. The newest substation is in Suurpelto, Espoo and it takes care of the electricity supply for the 20,00 customers in the area.

Between 2012 and 2017, Caruna invested nearly €1.2 billion in building a weatherproof electricity grid. In 2017, the company's investments were €277 million. With this investment amount, Caruna was the 14th largest investor in Finland in 2017 and ranked 3rd when comparing investments to the company's revenue. Extensive investments, particularly in underground cabling, better protect the electricity grid from storms and snow loads. Additionally, power outages affecting customers are minimized.

Electricity grid companies are under pressure to raise distribution prices as the weather-proofing of the grids is brought up to the level required by the Electricity Market Act by the end of 2028.

In 2022, Caruna's electricity distribution customers had the opportunity to comment on the company's electricity grid development plans. Over 4,000 of the company's customers provided feedback on the plans.

== Turnover ==
In 2022 the net sales amounted to EUR 484 million. Caruna paid a total of EUR 6.3 million in corporation tax in 2022. Caruna invested 127 million on building a reliable, weatherproof electricity network.

In 2017 Caruna turnover was €145 million and state tax rate 4% (€6 million). In 2017 Caruna paid its stakeholders 8.17% interest (77 million) while market loans were 1.5–3 % interest. Company interest cost were reduced from the taxable income based on Sipilä Cabinet taxation rules.

== Criticism of tax planning ==
According to the civic organization Finnwatch, the Finnish state lost approximately €12 million in tax revenue in 2017 due to the company's tax planning. This was made possible by a loophole in Finland's tax legislation, which allows for lower taxes by using another company within the same group, operating in a lower-tax country, as a lender to the company in the higher-tax country. The method is based on a balance sheet exemption rule, which allows the company to deduct interest expenses in its taxation. Finnwatch criticized the Finnish government for not preventing the aforementioned practice through legislation, even though it would be technically possible.

== See also ==
- Electricity sector in Finland
