= Hanasaari Power Plant =

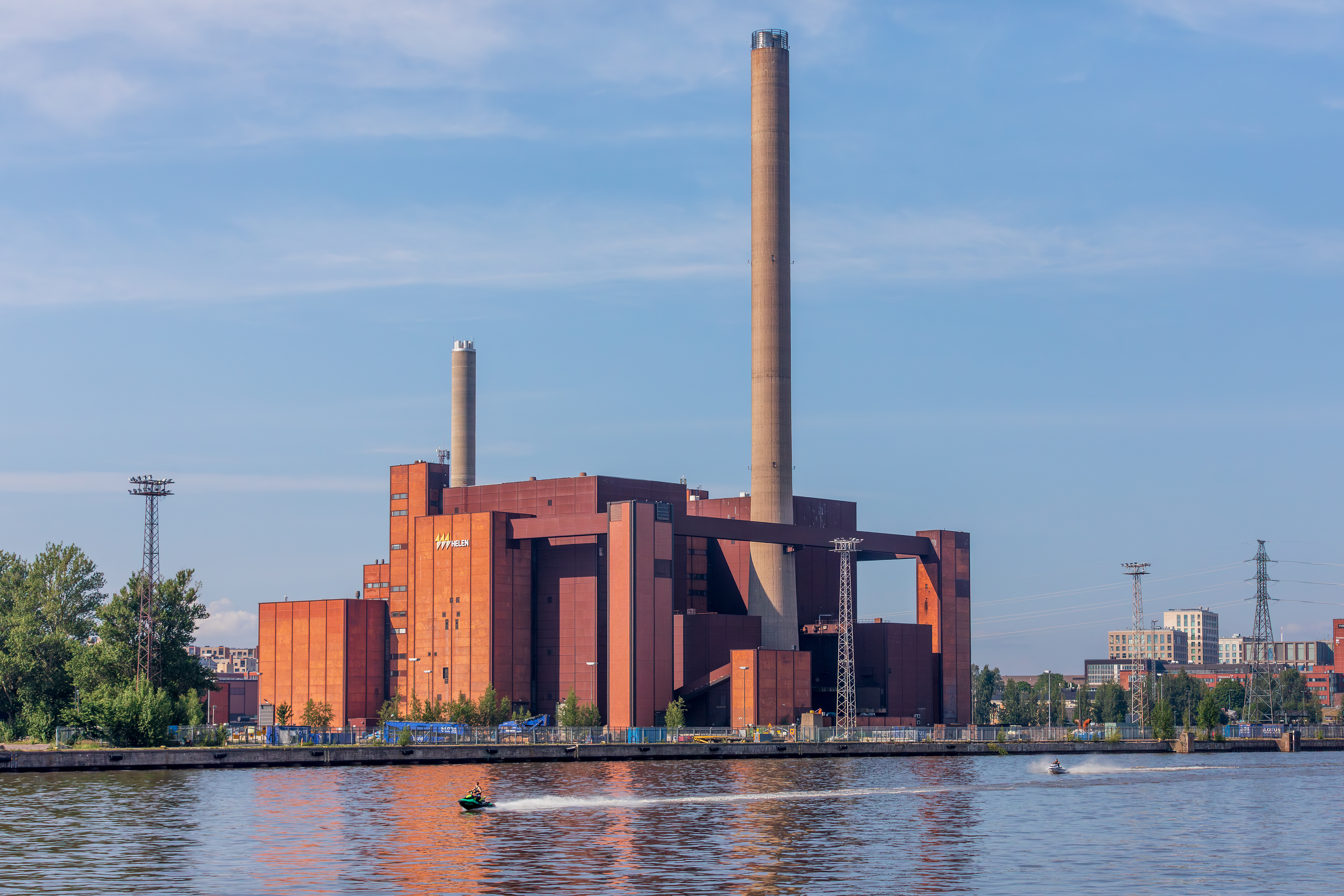
- Hanasaari B power plant
- Country: Finland
- Location: Hanasaari, Sörnäinen, Helsinki
- Coordinates: 60.184°N 24.971°E
- Status: Operational
- Commission date: 1967 (Hanasaari A); 1974 (Hanasaari B)
- Decommission date: 2000 (Hanasaari A); 2023 (Hanasaari B)
- Owner: Helen Oy

Thermal power station
- Primary fuel: Coal
- Secondary fuel: Biomass
- Cogeneration?: Yes

Power generation
- Units operational: 2 x 114 MW
- Make and model: Škoda
- Nameplate capacity: 228 MW

External links
- Commons: Related media on Commons

Hanasaari Power Plant (also referred as Hanasaari B power plant to distinguish from the dismantled power plant located at the same site) is a decommissioned coal-fired cogeneration power plant in Sörnäinen, Helsinki, Finland. Its chimney has a height of 150 metres (490 ft). The plant was shut down on April 1, 2023, after the Helsinki City Council had voted for its closing back in 2015.

== History ==
The first power plant in Hanasaari area, the Suvilahti steam power plant, was built in 1909. It stayed in operation until commissioning the existing Hanasaari power plant. Its facility is classified as an architecturally and historically significant building.

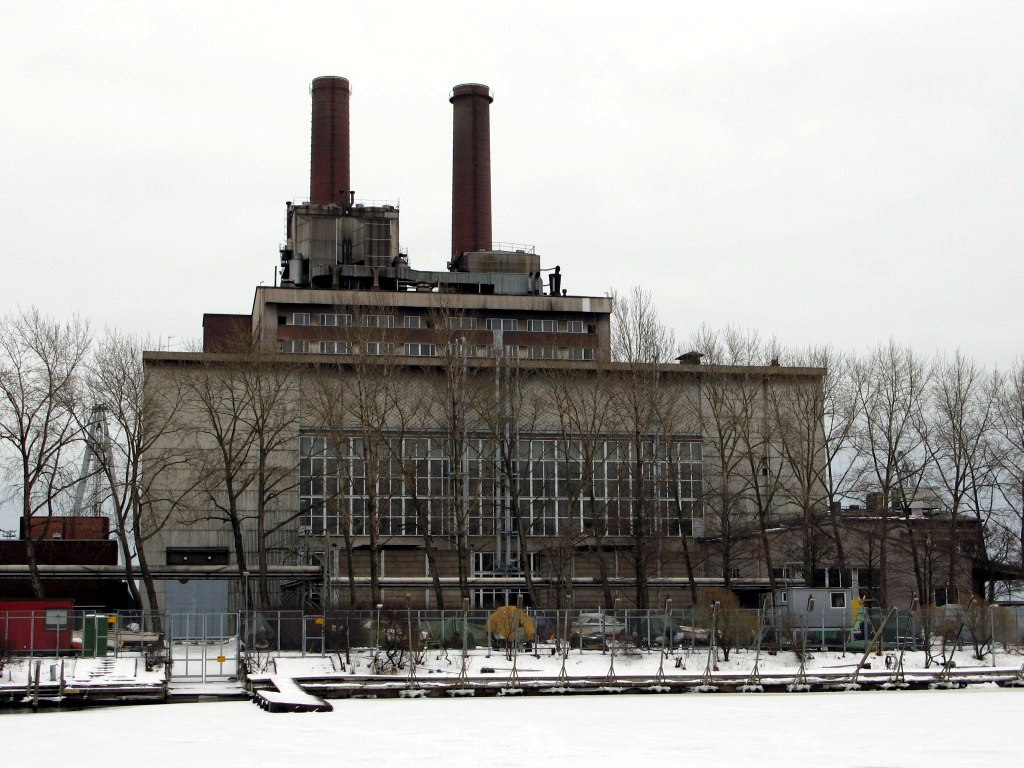
Hanasaari A power plant in 2007 (dismantled in 2008)

The Hanasaari A power plant was built in 1960–1967. The Hanasaari B power plant, built next to Hanasaari A, was commissioned in 1974. Hanasaari A was decommissioned in 2000 and dismantled in 2008. The coal store to be moved to the silos to be built next to the Hanasaari B as the southern part of the site will be restored for residential use. The residential area, named 'Tropaion', is designed by the Finnish architect bureau ALA. There is an experimental documentary Hanasaari A by Hannes Vartiainen and Pekka Veikkolainen.

== Description ==
Hanasaari B, a coal-fired cogeneration plant, produced electricity and heat with an output capacity of 220 MW of electricity and 420 MWt of district heating. The plant operated with two furnaces.

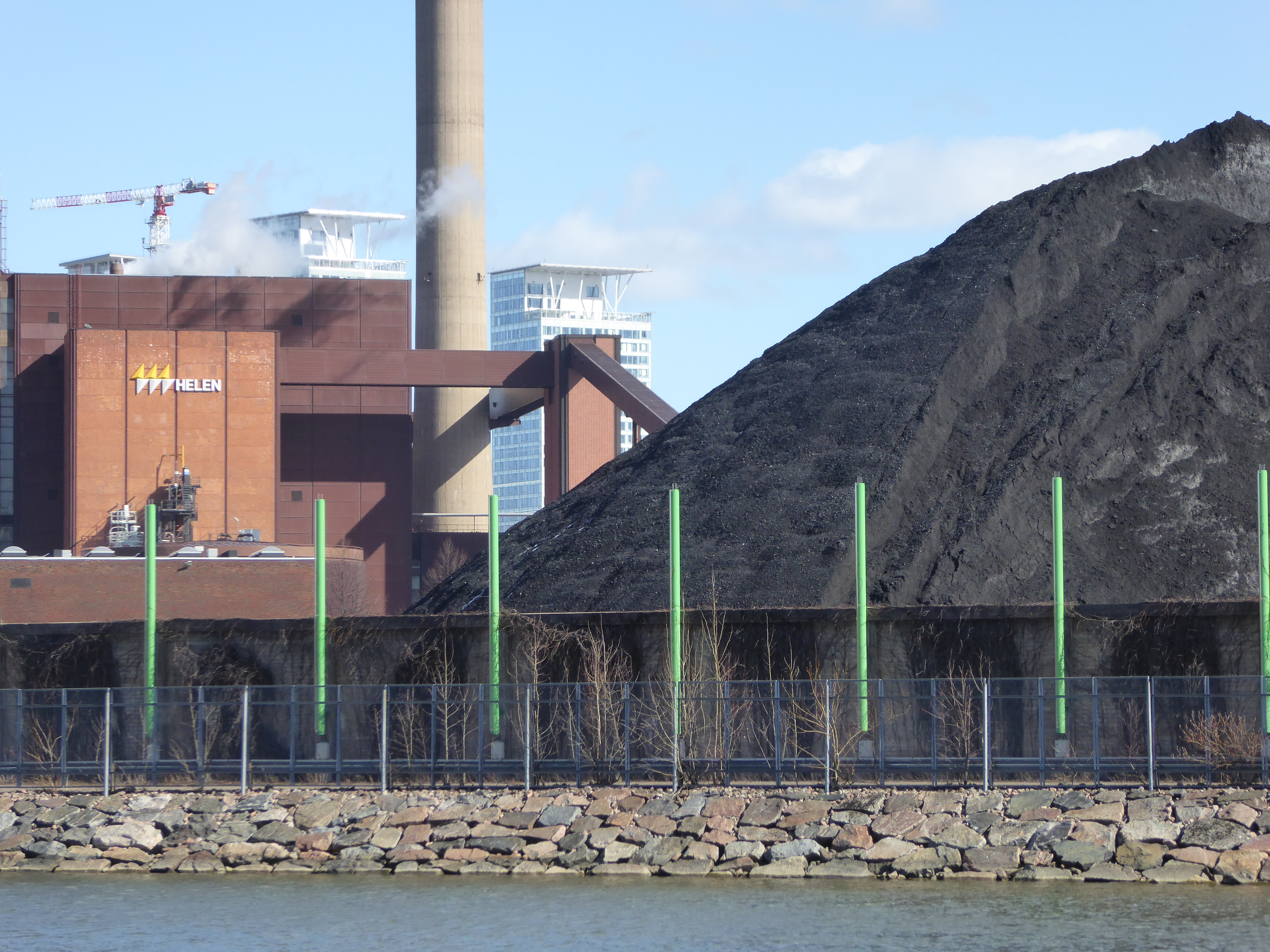
The Hanasaari B power plant seen from Merihaka two days after its announced shutdown at the end of March 2023

In the 2010s, a separate peak-load and reserve heating plant was built in front of the power plant. Helsingin Energia planned to modernize the Hanasaari power plant for combustion of biomass (wood) between 2014 and 2018. The biomass furnace would be set up alongside one of the existing coal units, which would be kept in reserve in case of emergency.

The Helsinki-owned energy company Helen Oy shut down all operations at the Hanasaari plant on Saturday 1 April 2023 as part of Helsinki's goal to reach carbon neutrality by the year 2030. The closure was referred as an "important, historic change for the capital, the country and the world at large" by the Mayor Juhana Vartiainen.

== See also ==
- Energy in Finland
- List of tallest structures in Finland
- Sörnäinen Harbour
