= Mustikkamaa–Korkeasaari =

Mustikkamaa-Korkeasaari (in Finnish) Blåbärslandet-Högholmen (in Swedish)
- Subdistrict of Helsinki
- Location in Helsinki
- Coordinates: 60.178277°N 24.982995°E
- Country: Finland
- Province: Southern Finland
- Region: Uusimaa
- City: Helsinki

Area
  - Total: 0.25 sq mi (0.66 km^{2})

Population
  - Total: 25
  - Density: 98/sq mi (38/km^{2})
- Time zone: UTC+2 (EET)
  - Summer (DST): UTC+3 (EEST)

Mustikkamaa-Korkeasaari (Swedish: Blåbärslandet-Högholmen) is a subdistrict of Helsinki, Finland. It includes the islands of Mustikkamaa and Korkeasaari, as well as some smaller islands. It has a population of 25.

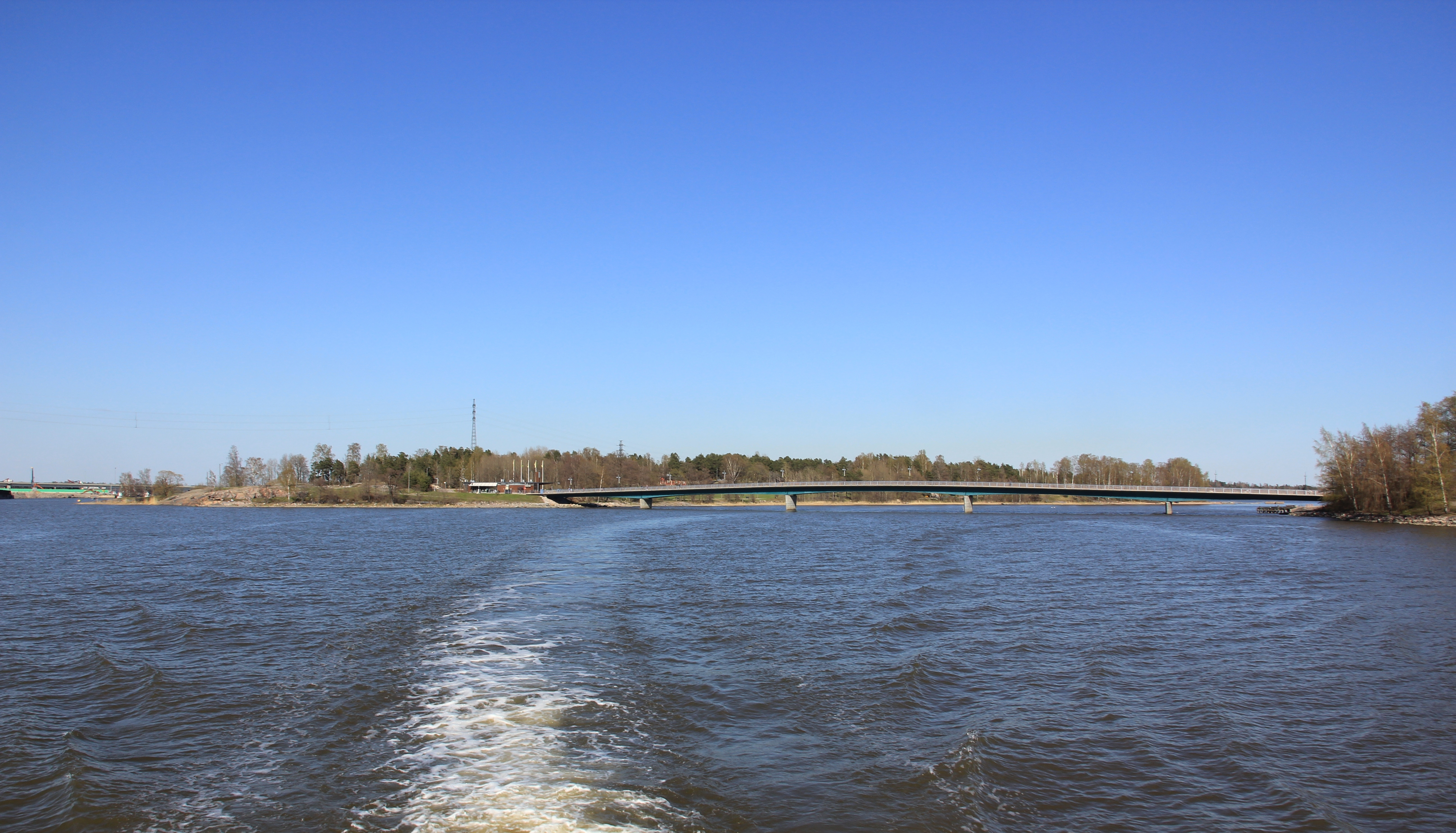
Mustikkamaa and the Korkeasaari bridge.
