= Plug-in electric vehicles in Finland =

As of March 2022

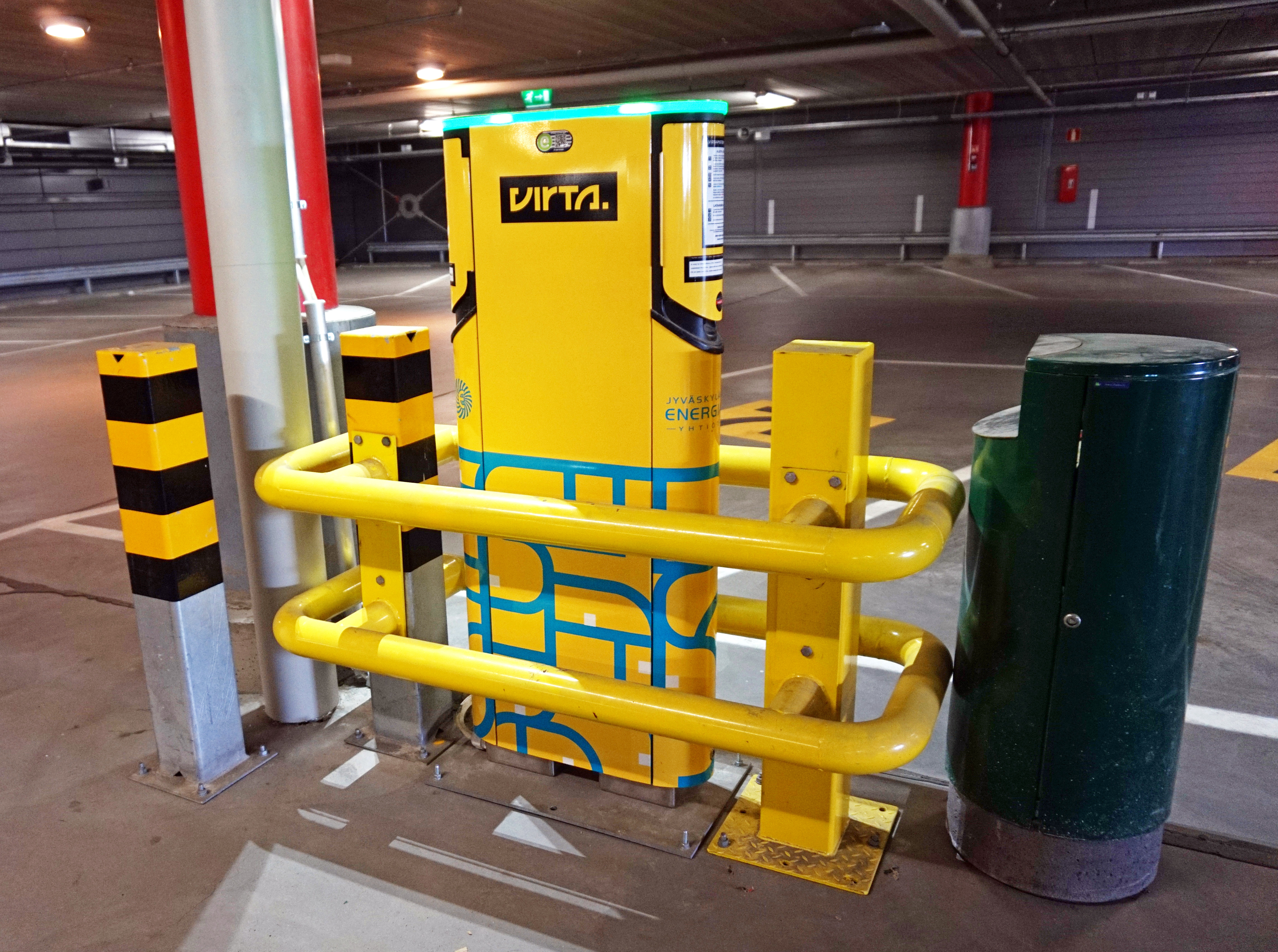
Electric car charging station

, there were about 27,000 battery electric vehicles and 84,000 plug-in hybrid vehicles in Finland. As of 2021, 31% of new cars sold in Finland were electric.

== Statistics ==
As of May 2021, the Volkswagen ID.4 was the best-selling electric vehicle in Finland.

== Government policy ==
As of 2018, the Finnish government offers tax rebates of up to €2,000 for electric vehicle purchases.

== Charging stations ==
As of December 2020, there were 1,302 public charging station locations in Finland.

== Public opinion ==
In a 2022 poll conducted by Tori Auto, slightly more than half of respondents in Finland said that they were unwilling to buy an electric car for their next vehicle purchase, compared with 30% for Norway and Sweden, and 23% for Denmark.

== By region ==
=== Central Finland ===
As of 2021, 18% of new cars registered in Central Finland were electric.

=== North Ostrobothnia ===
As of 2022, there were about 900 electric vehicles in Oulu.

=== Pirkanmaa ===
As of 2022, there were about 1,500 electric vehicles in Tampere.

=== Satakunta ===
As of June 2022, about 11% of new cars registered in Satakunta were electric.

=== Southwest Finland ===
As of 2022, there were about 1,000 electric vehicles in Turku.

=== Uusimaa ===
As of 2022, there were about 6,000 electric vehicles in Helsinki.

=== Åland ===
As of August 2022, there were 16 public charging stations in Åland.
