= Finnish Energy Authority =

Authority within the Finnish Ministry of Economic Affairs and Employment

Energy Authority
- Energimyndigheten

Agency overview
- Formed: 2014
- Preceding agency: Finnish Energy Market Authority (1995–2013)
- Headquarters: Lintulahdenkuja 2 A Sörnäinen, Helsinki
- Employees: 111 (2023)
- Annual budget: €12.4 million (2023)
- Agency executives: Simo Nurmi, Director-General
- Parent agency: Ministry of Economic Affairs and Employment
- Website: energiavirasto.fi

The Finnish Energy Authority (Finnish: Energiavirasto) is an expert authority within the Ministry of Economic Affairs and Employment in Finland. It was initially named Electricity Market Center (SMK) and before the most recent name change, Energy Market Authority (EMV).

== Background ==
Electricity transmission in Finland is a natural monopoly, managed by regional transmission companies. The Energy Authority oversees these companies to ensure they do not abuse their monopoly position and overcharge their customers.

== Functions ==
The Energy Authority's tasks include monitoring the pricing of the electricity transmission grid and natural gas markets, and maintaining Finland's national emission trading registry. The agency also provides information on electricity prices to consumers to support the competition of electricity suppliers. Additionally, the Energy Authority oversees the implementation of electricity origin guarantees, ensuring that the amount of energy sold to consumers by energy companies, such as wind energy, is produced by wind power. The Energy Authority also administers the renewable energy feed-in tariffs that came into effect in 2011.

Regarding emissions trading, the Energy Authority grants and monitors emissions permits, oversees the implementation of emissions trading, approves emissions verifiers, and acts as the auctioneer of emission allowances in Finland.

== History ==
In early 2014, the Energy Authority adopted its current name and assumed tasks related to energy efficiency and the promotion of renewable energy from the Ministry of Economic Affairs and Employment. At that time, the Energy Authority employed 70 people. Simo Nurmi has been the Director-General since April 2015.

== See also ==
- European Union Agency for the Cooperation of Energy Regulators
