= Energy in Finland =

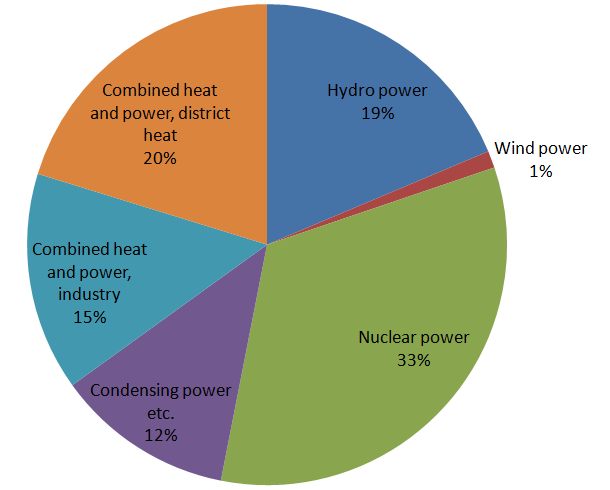
Energy production in Finland

Development of carbon dioxide emissions

Energy in Finland describes energy and electricity production, consumption and import in Finland. Energy policy of Finland describes the politics of Finland related to energy. Electricity sector in Finland is the main article regarding electricity in Finland.

Finland lacks domestic sources of fossil energy and must import substantial amounts of petroleum, natural gas, and other energy resources, including uranium for nuclear power.

In 2021, Finland's total energy supply (TES) comprised bioenergy and waste (33.6%), oil (20.8%), nuclear (18.5%), coal (6.3%), natural gas (6.4%), electricity imports (4.6%), hydro (4.1%), peat (2.7%), wind (2.2%), and heat (0.6%). Regarding total final consumption (TFC) by sector, the industrial sector accounted for 53%, buildings for 31%, and transport for 16%.

Finland's per capita energy consumption is notably high, driven by its heavy industry sector and significant heating requirements due to its cold climate. In 2021, the industrial sector was the primary consumer of energy, accounting for 52% of Total Final Consumption (TFC)—above the International Energy Agency (IEA) average of 36%. Building energy demand followed, representing 33% of TFC, where electricity (43% of building TFC) and district heating (15% of TFC) were key sources of energy consumption. Finland and Estonia are two of the last countries in the world still burning peat.

== Statistics ==
2020 energy statistics

Production capacities for electricity (billion kWh)
Type	Amount
Nuclear	59.74
Hydro	41.50
Biomass	31.84
Fossil fuel	23.97
Wind power	21.28
Solar	0.71
Total	179.04

Electricity (billion kWh)
Category	Amount
Consumption	79.36
Production	66.98
Import	21.62
Export	6.67

Crude oil (barrels per day)
Consumption	207,400
Production	8,300
Import	232,400

Natural gas (billion m^{3})
Consumption	2.39
Import	2.57
Export	0.01

CO_{2} emissions:
36.33 million tons

== Consumption ==
Final consumption of energy - i.e. after losses through transformation and transmission - was 1 102 petajoules, which equals 202 gigajoules per capita in 2013. Of this, 43 % is consumed by industry, 16% in transportation, 27% in heating, and 12% by others.

Energy consumption per capita in Finland is the highest in EU. Reasons for this include energy-intensive industry, a high standard of living, a cold climate and long distances. Rise of energy consumption stopped in the 21st century, mainly due to changes of industry. There is now less heavy industry and the energy efficiency has improved. New energy consuming business is the data centres of international enterprises.

Energy consumption increased 44 percent in electricity and 30 percent in the total energy use from 1990 to 2006. The increase in electricity consumption 15,000 GWh from 1995 to 2005 was more than the total hydropower capacity. The electricity consumption increased almost equally in all sectors (industry, homes, and services).

=== Heating ===
Energy consumption for heating has increased, as population and average size of homes has grown. As of 2019, 2.8 million Finns and half a million Helsinki residents rely on district heating for their homes. In 2017, 66% of the new homes were connected to district heating and usage kept expanding among old buildings as well.

80% of the energy use of households was spent on heating in 2008–2011.

In 2017, traditional fossil fuels (coal, peat and oil) provided most heat, with 39%; gas, 10%; wood and wood residues, 30%; bio and non-bio waste burning and other sources, 12%; energy recovery, 9%: in total, the emissions were 149 g CO_{2}/kWh.

Heat pumps are used to facilitate electrification and energy recovery. In Mäntsälä 80% of the energy is provided by excess heat recovered from the local Yandex data centre. In Helsinki, Helen Oy increases energy efficiency with several heat pumps which recover heat from return water of the district cooling and from warm waste waters before they end up in the Baltic Sea: rock caverns and cisterns under parks are used in the Katri Vala heating and cooling plant under Sörnäinen (123 MW in 2021), Vuosaari (13+9.5 MW with 20% sea water) and Esplanadi.

The coal-powered Hanasaari Power Plant will be replaced by 2024 to reduce Helen carbon emissions by 40%. In addition to heat pumps, 25% of its former output is expected to come from a biomass plant in Vuosaari next to the existing heat pumps, while heat storage to stabilise demand will be provided by water cisterns in place of the former oil cisterns under the Mustikkamaa island. In detail, Helen Oy estimates a 11.6 GWh capacity and 120 MW thermal output for its 260,000 m^{3} water cistern under Mustikkamaa (fully charged or discharged in 4 days at capacity), operating from 2021 to offset days of peak production/demand; while the 300,000 m^{3} rock caverns 50 m under sea level in Kruunuvuorenranta (near Laajasalo) were designated in 2018 to store heat in summer from warm sea water and release it in winter for district heating.

=== Transport ===
Transport uses 30% of all energy, but 40% of the energy is produced with oil. Consumption per kilometre has decreased, but the number of kilometres has grown.

The Kyoto agreement had obligation to restrict the traffic emissions in Finland between 2008 and 2012 in the year 1990 level. According to Ministry report in 2004 the share of public transport in Finland is lower than in most other European countries.

=== Electricity ===
From 2010 to 2021, Finland, a net electricity importer, experienced annual import levels ranging from 11 to 20 terawatt-hours (TWh), or 14% to 31% of its electricity supply. Initially, the majority of imports came from Russia, averaging 88% from 2005 to 2011. After a new interconnection with Sweden became operational in 2012, Sweden became the main supplier, accounting for 87% of imports from 2012 to 2021. In May 2022, following Finland's intention to join NATO amidst the Ukraine invasion and due to payment transfer issues, Russia ceased supplying electricity to Finland. The commencement of the Olkiluoto 3 nuclear reactor in 2023 is expected to reduce Finland's reliance on electricity imports, aiming for the country to become a net exporter by 2030.

In Finland electricity consumption was 83.3 TWh in 2021 compared to 60 TWh in 1990. Consumers in 2021 were industry 49%, residential buildings 29%, service sector buildings 21%.

One of the major electrical grid distribution network operators, Caruna in the south of Finland is majority-owned (80%) by Australian and Dutch holding and property companies.

== Energy sources ==
From 2011 to 2021, Finland experienced a significant shift in its energy mix. The share of fossil fuels in Total Energy Supply (TES) declined from 53% to 36%, with decreases seen across all types: oil (26% to 21%), natural gas (9.6% to 6.4%), and coal (11% to 6.3%). Peat's contribution to TES also decreased from 5.8% to 2.7%. These changes were driven by transitions to renewable energy sources, notably solid biomass, with bioenergy and waste increasing from 23% to 34% of TES. Wind energy grew from 0.1% to 2.3%, while nuclear energy remained stable at 18%, expected to rise with the new Olkiluoto 3 reactor's full operation.

=== Wood ===
About one quarter of energy production in Finland comes from burning wood. There are no forests grown for fuel. Instead, most firewood is byproduct of other uses of wood. The black liquor (by-product of pulp production) and peel and branches (by-product of sawmill industry) are used by the forest industry itself in creating its own energy by wood burning.

The Finnish Association for Nature Conservation (FANC) demands Finland not to burn stumps and sturdy wood that are 15% of wood chips burned according to government energy policy.

=== Fossil fuels ===
==== Petroleum ====
Finland does not have any petroleum resources of its own, so it relies 100% on petroleum imports. In 2007 oil imports were almost 11 million tonnes in Finland. In 2006, Finnish oil imports came from Russia (64 percent), Norway (11 percent), Denmark (11 percent), and the rest from United Kingdom, Kazakhstan, and Algeria. Petroleum comprises 24 percent of the Finnish energy consumption. Most of the petroleum is used in vehicles, but about 260,000 homes are heated by heating oil.

Neste Oil is the sole oil refiner in Finland, exporting petroleum products such as gasoline and fuel oil to the Baltic countries and North America. Oil imports were valued at 6.5 billion euros and exports 3 billion euros in 2006.

==== Coal ====
Coal is imported from Poland. 5.3 million tonnes were used in 2016.

According to Finnwatch (27 September 2010) there are 13 coal power plants in Finland. The companies Pohjolan Voima, Fortum, Helsingin Energia and Rautaruukki consume coal most.

The ILO Agreement 176 (1995) addresses health and safety risks in mines. Finland ratified the agreement in 1997. However, as of 2017 the agreement was not ratified in the following countries that export coal to Finland: Canada, Australia, Colombia, Kazakhstan, Indonesia and China. At least two companies in Finland reported (2010) using the UN Global Compact initiative criteria in their supplier relationships. No Finnish company reported signing the UN Global Compact Initiative.

Coal, which in 2021 accounted for 4.9% of electricity generation, will be banned from 2029.

==== Natural gas ====
Finland has no production facilities or underground storage facilities for gas.

Natural gas has been used in Finland since 1974 after the first oil crisis. Gasum is the Finnish importer and seller of natural gas, which owns and operates Finnish natural gas transmission system. Natural gas vehicles aren't popular in Finland, but natural gas powered busses exist.

On 21 May 2022, the supply of gas from Russia to Finland was cut off because Gasum refused to pay for the gas deliveries in rubles as required by the Russian gas company Gazprom and Moscow. The import of gas to Finland was then switched over to come through the Balticconnector pipeline. The LNG terminal ship Exemplar was also leased for 10 years to cover Finland's gas needs in the event of any shortages. The ship's annual gas capacity is 35 terawatt-hours (TWh).

==== Peat ====
Peat and hard coal are the most harmful energy sources for global warming in Finland. According to VTT studies, peat is often the most harmful one.

Peat was the most popular energy source in Finland for new energy investments 2005–2015. The new energy plants in Finland starting 2005–2015 have as energy source: peat 36% and hard coal 11%: combined: 47%. The major carbon dioxide emitting peat plants during 2005–15 were expected to be (CO_{2} kt): PVO 2700 kt, Jyväskylän Energia 561 kt, Etelä-Pohjanmaan Voima Oy (EPV Energia) 374 kt, Kuopion Energia 186 kt, UPM Kymmene 135 kt and Vapo 69 kt. EPV Energy is partner in TVO nuclear plants and Jyväskylän and Kuopion Energia partners in Fennovoima nuclear plants in Finland.

According to IEA country report the Finnish subsidies for peat undermine the goal to reduce CO_{2} emissions and counteracts other environmental policies and The European Union emissions trading scheme. IEA recommends to adhere to the timetable to phase out the peat subsidies in 2010. "To encourage sustained production of peat in the face of negative incentives from the European Union's emissions trading scheme for greenhouse gases, Finland has put in place a premium tariff scheme to subsidise peat. The premium tariff is designed to directly counter the effect of the European Union's emissions trading scheme".

Finland plans to reduce peat energy production, which generates 2.6% of Finland's electricity, it will be reduced by 50% by 2030.

=== Renewable energy ===
Years in which the last three renewable power levels achieved
Achievement	Year	Achievement	Year	Achievement	Year
2%	<1990	4%	2014	6%	2022

Renewable energy encompasses biomass, hydro, wind, solar, and geothermal energy sources.

From 2011 to 2021, the proportion of renewable energy in Finland's total final energy consumption (TFEC) steadily increased from 34% to 48%. This growth was primarily fueled by rises in bioenergy (from 29% to 38%), hydro (from 4.7% to 6.1%), and wind (from 0.2% to 3.3%). In 2020, Finland ranked third among IEA member countries for its share of renewables in TFEC. By 2021, renewables accounted for 43.1% of Finland's gross final energy consumption, 39.5% of electricity generation, 52.6% of heating and cooling, and 20.5% of transport.

In 2021, renewables made up 53% of Finland's electricity generation, totaling 38 terawatt-hours (TWh). This consisted of bioenergy contributing 13.6 TWh, hydro 15.8 TWh, wind 8.5 TWh, and solar 0.3 TWh.

The total renewable energy generating capacity has increased in Finland during the 2010s (in 2010: 5,170 MW; 2016: 7,067 MW). In 2016 the estimated renewable energy production was over 130 terawatt-hours in Finland.

==== Wind energy ====
The first offshore wind farm came on line in 2017.

EU and Finland wind energy capacity (MW)
Country	2022	2021	2020	2019	2018	2017	2016	2015	2014	2013	2012	2011	2010	2009	2008	2007	2006	2005	2004	2003	2002	2001	2000	1999	1998
EU+UK^{*}	232,992	215,704	203,256	192,231	178,862	168,729	153,730	141,579	129,060	117,289	106,454	93,957	84,074	74,767	64,712	56,517	48,069	40,511	34,383	28,599	23,159	17,315	12,887	9,678	6,453
Finland	5,678	3,328	2,586	2,284	2,041	2,113	1,539	1,001	627	448	288	199	197	147	142	109	86	82	82	52	43	39	38	38	17

==== Geothermal ====
In Espoo, St1 and Fortum are testing a geothermal plant. In 2018, water was pumped in the bedrock under Otaniemi through a bore over 6 km deep made with a down-the-hole drill to reach the warmer earth crust, in a process which was allowed to produce microearthquakes up to magnitude 1.9. Once an appropriate position is found to drill an exit bore towards which the water would flow underground, the plant could produce 40 MW of thermal power.

=== Nuclear power ===
As of 2008, Finland had four nuclear reactors in two power plants. The first of these came into operation in 1977. In 2000–2014, the four units produced 21.4–22.7 TWh electricity per year, 27–35% of energy production and 24–28% of energy consumption in Finland. They are among the world's most efficient, with average capacity factors of 94% in the 1990s. Work began on an additional reactor in 2005 at Olkiluoto Nuclear Power Plant. The reactor, constructed by Areva, is a European Pressurized Reactor (EPR) with a power output of 1,600 MWe, originally scheduled to start production in 2009. At a total cost of over €8.5 billion, regular electricity production started in April 2023.

Another nuclear power station is under development by the Fennovoima consortium. The Russian nuclear engineering company Rosatom owns 34% of the project. Various Finnish corporations and local governments are also major owners.

The share of electricity produced by nuclear power could double by 2025, reaching around 60%.

=== Hydropower ===
Finland has more than 330 hydro power plants, with total capacity of over 3,100 megawatts in 2022.

Hydro accounted for 18% of Finland's total installed power generation capacity and 22% of total power generation in 2021.

=== Green Hydrogen ===
In 2023 it was planned to create three green hydrogen plants in Finland producing 850 tons of green hydrogen daily, 2.2GW per annum.

== Environmental effects ==
=== Climate change ===
In 2008, Finland's greenhouse gas emissions totalled 70.1 million tons of carbon dioxide (CO2e). A little over three-quarters of them were based on energy or released from the energy sector.

The carbon dioxide emissions by fossil fuels in 2008 originated from 45% oil, 39% coal and 15% natural gas. In the year 2000 the shares were nearly equal: 48% oil and 37% coal. The fossil traffic fuels: motor petrol, diesel and aviation petrol are oil products. The biomass included 47% of black liquor and 52% of wood in 2008. These shares were practically same during 1990–2006. All biomass and agricultural warming gas emissions are free of charge in the EU emissions trading in 2008–2012. According to the official statistics the annual fossil fuel and coal emissions in Finland have large annual variation. E.g. the fossil fuel CO_{2} emissions dropped 18% in the year 2005 and 13% in 2008, but the annual coal emissions increased 22% in 1996, 22% in 2001 and 58% in 2006.

=== Particulates ===
Particulate, the size of which is from a few nanometers to visible dust particles, are considered the most important environmental factor affecting human life. About half of particulates are of anthropogenic origin: traffic, industry and energy production. In Finland, the most important source is burning wood as fuel. Also the NO_{2} and SO_{2} gases become particulates in the atmosphere.

== Energy and climate goals ==
The objective of RE (2005) of electricity was 35% (1997–2010). However, (2006) the Finnish objective was dropped to 31.5% (1997–2010). According to 'Renewables Global Status Report' Finland aims to increase RE only 2% in 13 years. This objective to add the RE use with 2% in 13 years is among the modest of all the EU countries.

The public energy subsidies in Finland in 2013 were €700 million for fossil energy and €60 million for renewable energy (mainly wood and wind). An increased feed-in tariff was used for new wind power industry in 2011 to 2015.

Finland's energy and climate strategy targets carbon neutrality by 2035, emphasizing energy security, sustainability, and biodiversity. The Climate Change Act, revised in July 2022, mandates neutrality by 2035 and sets goals for greenhouse gas (GHG) emissions reductions: 60% by 2030, 80% by 2040, and 90-95% by 2050, excluding Land Use, Land-Use Change, and Forestry (LULUCF). Finland's approach includes nuclear energy, more renewables for electricity and heat, improved energy efficiency, and economy-wide electrification. After Russia's 2022 invasion of Ukraine, Finland moved to cut Russian energy imports, which previously comprised 81% of crude oil, 75% of natural gas, and 19% of electricity imports in 2021. The country's energy shift is highlighted by launching Europe's first new nuclear reactor in 15 years in April 2023 and expanding onshore wind power.
