= Fingrid =

Finnish national electricity transmission grid operator

Fingrid logo

Fingrid Oyj is a Finnish national electricity transmission grid operator. It is owned by the Finnish state (53.1%) and various financial and insurance institutions (46.9%).

In 2011, power companies Fortum Power and Heat Oy and Pohjolan Voima sold their stakes in Fingrid (25% each), because of EU Internal Market Directive in Electricity, which requires that power production and ownership of the transmission systems should be separate. The transmission from and to the Russian network was interrupted by the Russian side on May 13, 2022.

== History ==
Suomen Kantaverkko Oy, now known as Fingrid Oyj, was established on 29 November 1996. The company began its operational activities on 1 September 1997. At the time, the transaction between Imatran Voima Oy, Pohjolan Voima Oy, and the Finnish state—valued at over one billion euros—was the largest business deal in Finland’s economic history. The agreement consolidated the transmission grid business and power transmission networks into a single company. Suomen Kantaverkko Oy purchased from IVO Voimansiirto Oy and Teollisuuden Voimansiirto Oy the 400 kV, 220 kV, and key 110 kilovolt transmission networks owned by those companies, which together formed the Finnish national grid. Later, insurance companies Pohjola, Sampo, and Tapiola Group also became shareholders.

Finland’s membership in the European Union and the directive on the liberalization of electricity markets significantly influenced the establishment of the company, as the directive required the separation of electricity transmission management from electricity production and sales. According to Antti Tuuri’s biography of Tauno Matomäki, the paper and pulp industry’s dissatisfaction with Imatran Voima’s transmission pricing also played a key role. The forest industry-owned Pohjolan Voima threatened to build its own main transmission line from the Tornio River Valley to Vyborg, which would have allowed the coastal forest industry to purchase energy from Sweden and Russia and transport it through its own network if necessary. After the founding of Fingrid, which operates on a non-profit basis, transmission fees immediately dropped by 15 percent, and as Fingrid continued to generate profits, prices were reduced even further.

Jukka Ruusunen was president and CEO until he retired at the end of 2023. His successor Asta Sihvonen-Punkka, previously executive vice president, took over on 1 January 2024.

== See also ==
- Energy in Finland
- European Network of Transmission System Operators for Electricity (ENTSO-E)
