= Helen Oy =

Finnish energy company

- Company type: osakeyhtiö
- Industry: energy
- Founded: 1909
- Headquarters: Helsinki, Finland
- Area served: Finland
- Key people: Pekka Manninen (president)
- Products: energy, district heating, district cooling, solar power systems
- Owner: City of Helsinki
- Subsidiaries: Oy Mankala Ab; Helen Sähköverkko Oy; Suomen Energia-Urakointi Oy (SEU); Helsingin Energiatunnelit Oy
- Website: www.helen.fi

Helen Oy, stylized as HELEN, formerly known as Helsingin Energia (Finnish) and Helsingfors Energi (Swedish), is one of the largest energy companies in Finland. The company, founded in 1909 produces and sells electricity, district heating and district cooling.

Helen is headquartered in the Sähkötalo building in central Helsinki. It operates five power plants in Helsinki and four in the Kymenlaakso region. Additionally, the company has nine district heating plants in Helsinki.

== History ==
The first electricity company in Helsinki was founded in 1884. Several energy companies were established over the following twenty years, each capable of producing enough electricity to power only a few city blocks.

Helsingin kaupungin sähkölaitos (electricity works of the City of Helsinki) was established in 1909. Every small electricity company in Helsinki was transferred to the ownership of the city. During this period a large power plant was constructed in the Suvilahti neighborhood of Sörnäinen in Helsinki. Since 1953 this power plant has produced district heating in addition to electricity.

In 1977 the company was merged with the coal gas-producing Helsingin kaupungin kaasulaitos (gas works of the City of Helsinki). The new works was named Helsingin kaupungin energialaitos (energy works of the City of Helsinki).

Later the production of coal gas was ceased, and the gas pipes were sold to a company called Helsinkikaasu, which started to provide natural gas.

In 1995 the name of the company was changed to Helsingin Energia. In 2015, the company was restructured as a limited company and renamed Helen Oy.

== District heating production ==
In 1953 Helsingin Energia started to produce district heating. Nowadays over 90% of apartments in Helsinki use district heating. Helsingin Energia is the biggest company in Finland to sell district heating.

== Electricity production ==
The company sells electricity to over 1,000,000 customers around Finland. Approximately 74% of the electricity is produced in power plants located in Helsinki.

== See also ==
- Energy in Finland
