= Pohjolan Voima =

Finnish energy company

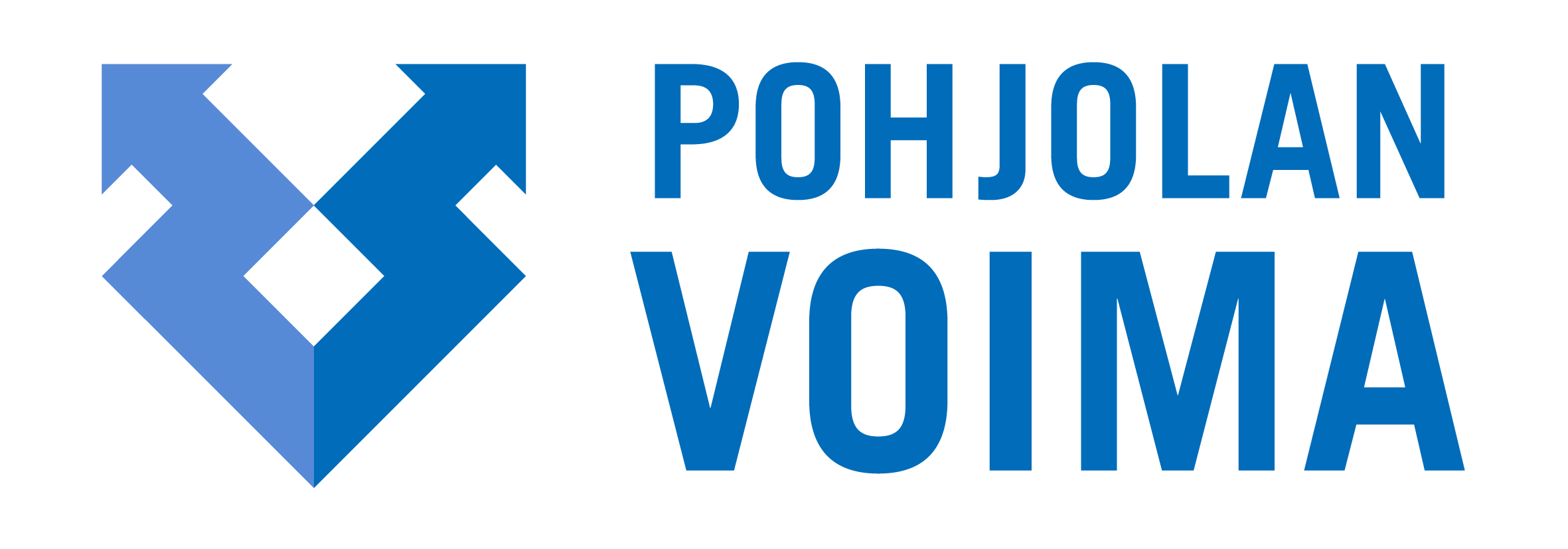
- Industry: Power Generation
- Founded: 1943; 83 years ago
- Headquarters: Helsinki, Finland
- Website: www.pohjolanvoima.fi

Pohjolan Voima Oyj (PVO; Swedish: Nordkraft Abp; English: Northern Power Company Plc) is the second biggest Finnish energy company, which owns hydropower and thermal power plants (including biofuel-fired power plants).

== History ==
Following World War II, Finland underwent a gradual transition from an agricultural economy towards an increasingly industrial and technological economy. The expansion of the forest industry contributed to rising energy demand and increased the industry's involvement in electricity generation. In 1943, forest industry companies established Pohjolan Voima (PVO) to develop and operate electricity generation capacity. The company initially invested in hydropower and later expanded into thermal and nuclear power generation, including investments in condensing power and nuclear power plants during the 1970s.

== Shareholders ==
Pohjolan Voima is a founder and main shareholder of the Olkiluoto Nuclear Power Plant operator Teollisuuden Voima Oyj.

Major shareholders of Pohjolan Voima are Finnish pulp and paper manufacturers UPM-Kymmene Oyj and Stora Enso Oyj; other shareholders include power and utility companies owned by several municipalities. Shareholders can receive electricity from each power plant in proportion to their ownership of the shares issued for the same plant or group of plants (so called Mankala principle) by paying the variable costs in proportion to the electricity actually delivered, while the fixed costs are distributed in proportion to the ownership.

== Carbon intensity ==
Year	Production (TWh)	Emission (Gt CO_{2})	kg CO_{2}/MWh
2002	16	6	375
2003	18	6.07	337
2004	18	4.95	280
2005	13	1.67	126
2006	18	4.73	264
2007	17	4.25	250
2008	22	2.92	131
2009	22	2.88	131

== Transmission grid ==
PVO sold its share of the Fingrid national electricity transmission grid operator with €247.4 million in April 2011. Income was delivered total to the owners in 2012. Biggest shares were UPM/Myllykoski €109 million and Stora Enso ca €37 million.

== See also ==
- Energy in Finland
- List of European power companies by carbon intensity
