= Xylino =

Xylino is a timber-based project, which comprises a five-storey residential development in Almere, Netherlands, constructed using a large-scale prefabricated modular timber system based on laminated veneer lumber (LVL).

The timber project was developed by the Dutch company, De Alliantie Ontwikkeling B.V., which is part of the Dutch housing corporation De Alliantie, together with the enterprise, Koopmans Bouwgroep. The prefabricated modules were manufactured by geWOONhout, while the Finnish group Metsä Wood supplied its Kerto LVL product for the load-bearing structure.

== Naming ==
The development took its original name from the Greek word for wood, ξύλο (adv., ξύλινο = made of wood, woody) and represented the first large-scale modular housing development built entirely from LVL.

== Description ==
The development comprises 103 homes and was assembled from 436 prefabricated timber modules. The modules were manufactured off-site and were delivered with integrated technical systems. The structural system used four LVL corner columns together with integrated floor and roof elements. The interlocking system allowed the building to be assembled without a conventional concrete structural core.

The whole installation followed an industrialised construction process. Construction teams placed approximately eight to twelve modules per each day, corresponding to three to four apartments, and a residential block was actually assembled in approximately four weeks. The modules have been incorporated building services before delivery to the specific construction site in Almere.

The project also incorporated a digital information system. According to sources, individual components were associated with digital information containing dimensions, specifications and end-of-life instructions, accessible through QR codes. The system was intended to facilitate accurate manufacturing as well as future disassembly, reuse and/or material recovery.

The architectural design was inspired and generated by the Dutch architectural group, Arons & Gelauff Architecten. Kerto LVL, an engineered wood product manufactured by Metsä Wood, and formed the primary load-bearing timber structure. From the very beginning of the project, the fire safety and the acoustic performance were major design considerations. The completed structure has been reported to achieve an R120 fire-resistance classification, while acoustic separation between modules and additional floor mass were used to meet residential performance requirements.

== Impact ==
Xylino was constructed between 2023 and 2026 and was completed in early of the year 2026. This development has attracted attention in the media, and within the timber-construction sector because it combined factory-produced modules, engineered timber, digital fabrication and rapid on-site assembly at residential scale. Its accomplishment has been cited as an example of industrialised timber construction intended to be repeatable in other future timber-housing projects.

== See also ==
- Laminated veneer lumber
- Engineered wood
