= Rauhalahti Power Station =

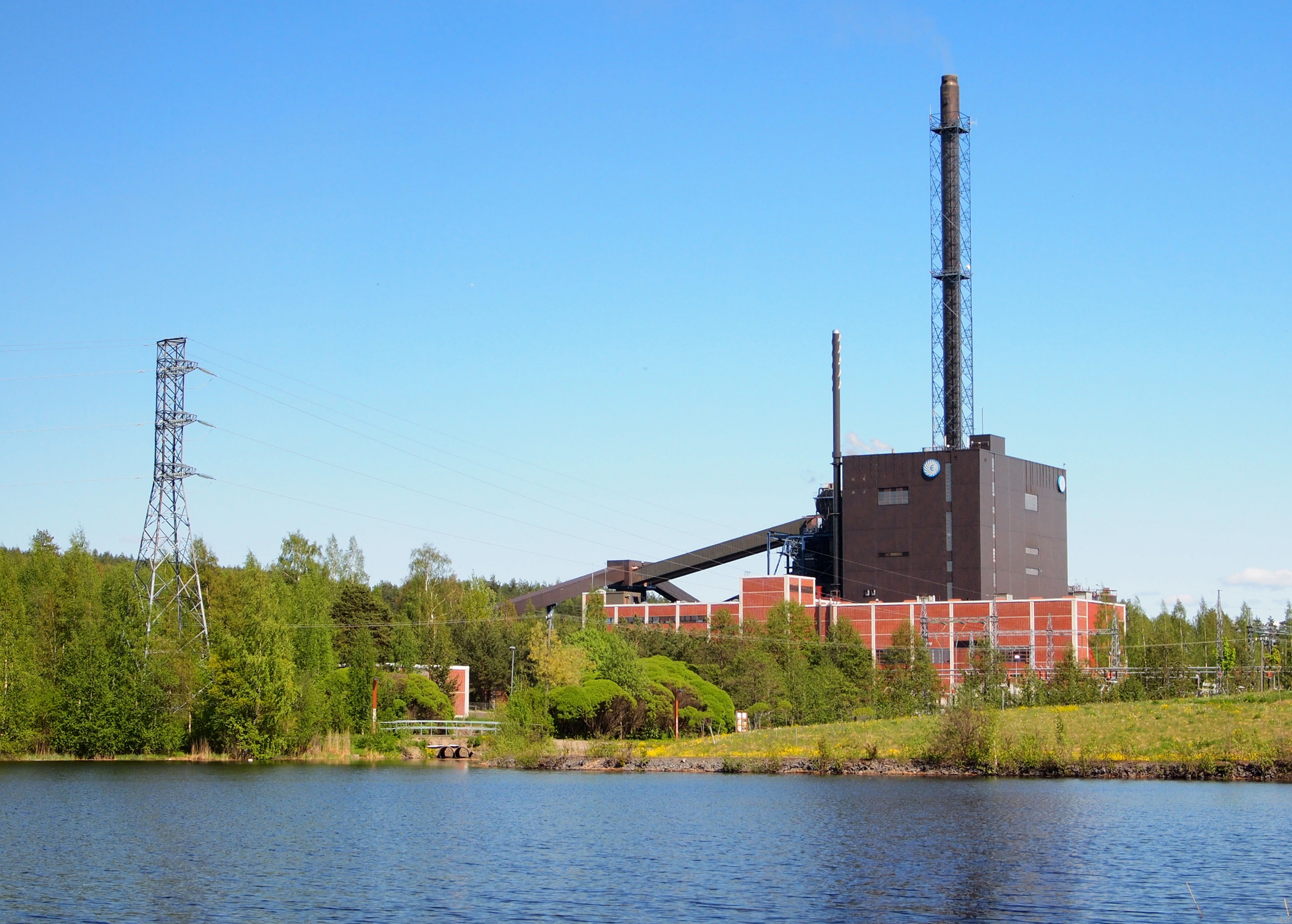
- Country: Finland
- Location: Jyväskylä
- Coordinates: 62°14′08″N 025°48′50″E
- Status: Operational
- Commission date: 1986
- Owner: Jyväskylän Energia
- Operator: Jyväskylän Energiantuotanto

Thermal power station
- Primary fuel: Biomass; Peat
- Secondary fuel: Coal
- Tertiary fuel: Fuel oil
- Cogeneration?: yes
- Thermal capacity: 105 MWt

Power generation
- Units operational: 1 × 89 MWe; 1 × 65 MWt; 1 × 40 MWt
- Make and model: ABB (turbine); Tampella (boilers)
- Nameplate capacity: 89 MW

External links
- Commons: Related media on Commons

Rauhalahti power station is a combined heat and power station built in 1986 in Jyväskylä, Finland. It is the main provider of district heat in Jyväskylä and it produced the steam used by Kangas Paper Mill until the mill was shut down in 2009. The construction cost of the plant was 84 million euros.

The plant is operated by Jyväskylän Energiantuotanto, which is owned by Jyväskylän Energia. Fortum owned 60 per cent of the company but Jyväskylän Energia bought the share for 40 million euros.

Power station's main sources of energy are firewood and peat; use of coal is rare. The peat is mainly provided by Neova, while the firewood is provided by sawmills in Central Finland and nearby wood processing industry.

Boiler	Year of Completion	District heat	Steam	Electricity	Total
Main boiler	1986	140 MW	40 MW	87 MW	267 MW
2-boiler	1992		65 MW		65 MW
District heat boiler	2004	40 MW			40 MW
Total		180 MW	105 MW	87 MW	372 MW

== See also ==
- Energy in Finland
- List of power stations in Finland
