= Kerto LVL =

New type of engineered wood

Engineered wood products used in buildings
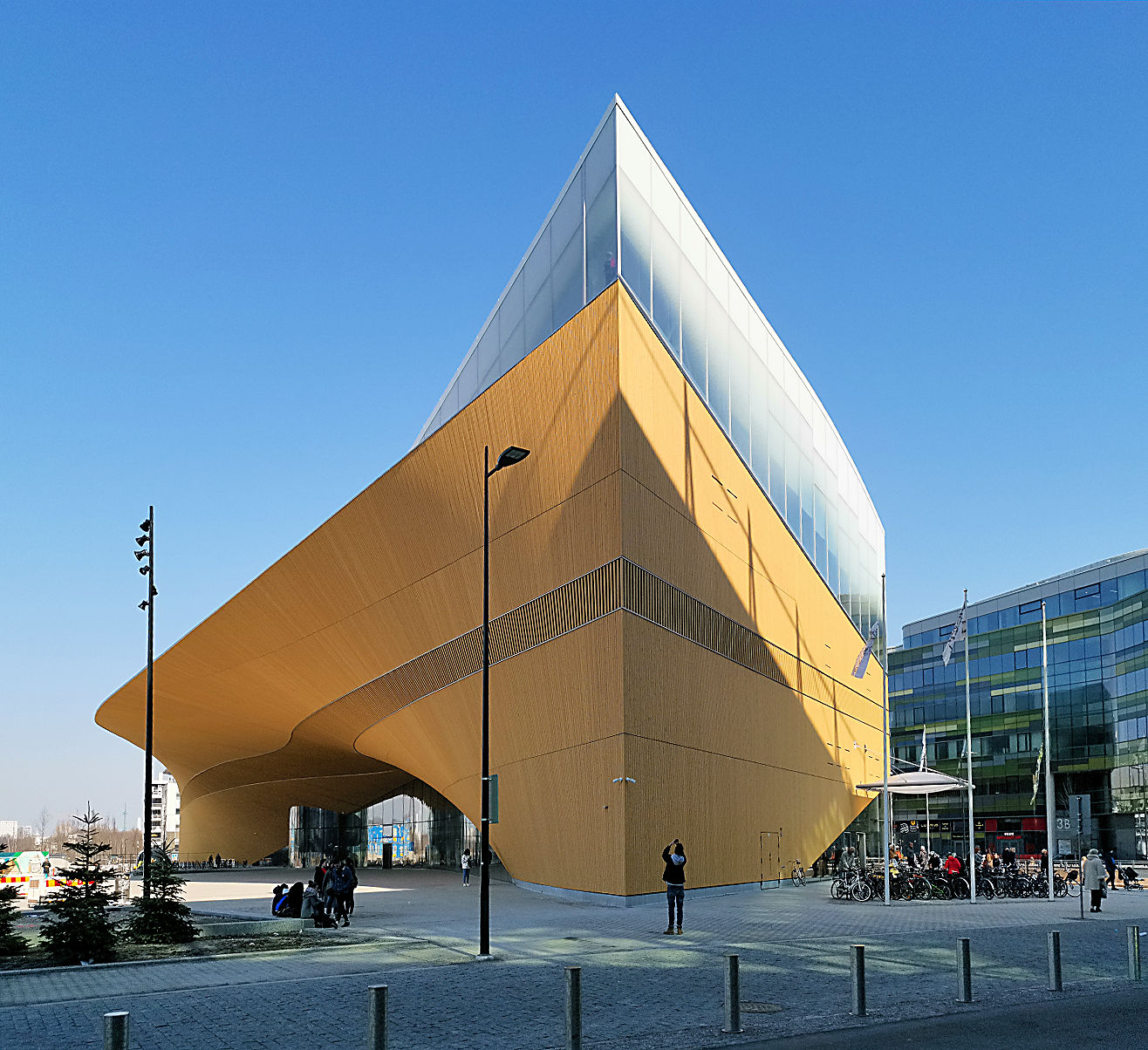
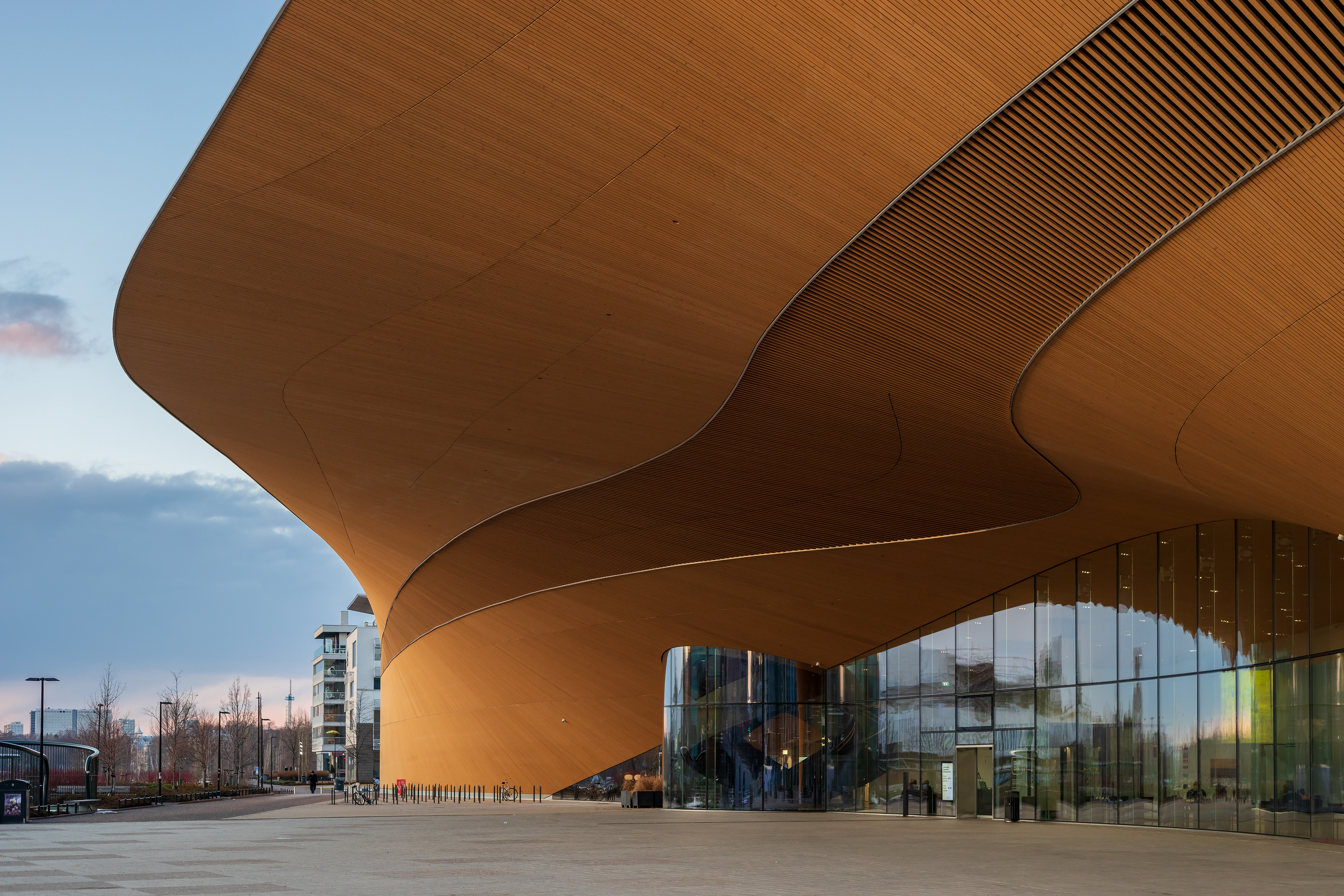

Kerto LVL is a type of laminated veneer lumber (LVL) made by Metsä Wood, which is part of the Finnish Metsä Group. It is an engineered wood product mainly used in structural construction. Typical uses include beams, joists, columns, studs, floors, roofs, wall panels, and prefabricated timber modules.

The product is constituted from softwood veneers that are of various thinknesses, mostly 3 mm. The veneers are peeled by rotary technology and graded before they are used. Mostly spruce wood, and to a lesser extent Scots pine, are used for the product. The veneers are glued together with resistant adhesives designed for exterior use. Then, a into a billet is formulated, and afterwards cut into beams, planks or even panels. The adhesive system used in the production consists of a weather- and boil-resistant resin which is a type of phenol-formaldehyde resin (PF).

The new product has been used in multi-storey and architecturally significant timber structures. Characteristic examples include the five-storey Wälderhaus building in Hamburg, Germany, the Metsä Pavilion in Tokyo and the Xylino building in the Netherlands.

An industrial plant was made in Europe to produce this type of new engineered wood.

== External websites ==
- Kerto LVL
