= Toppila Power Station =

Power plant in Oulu, Finland

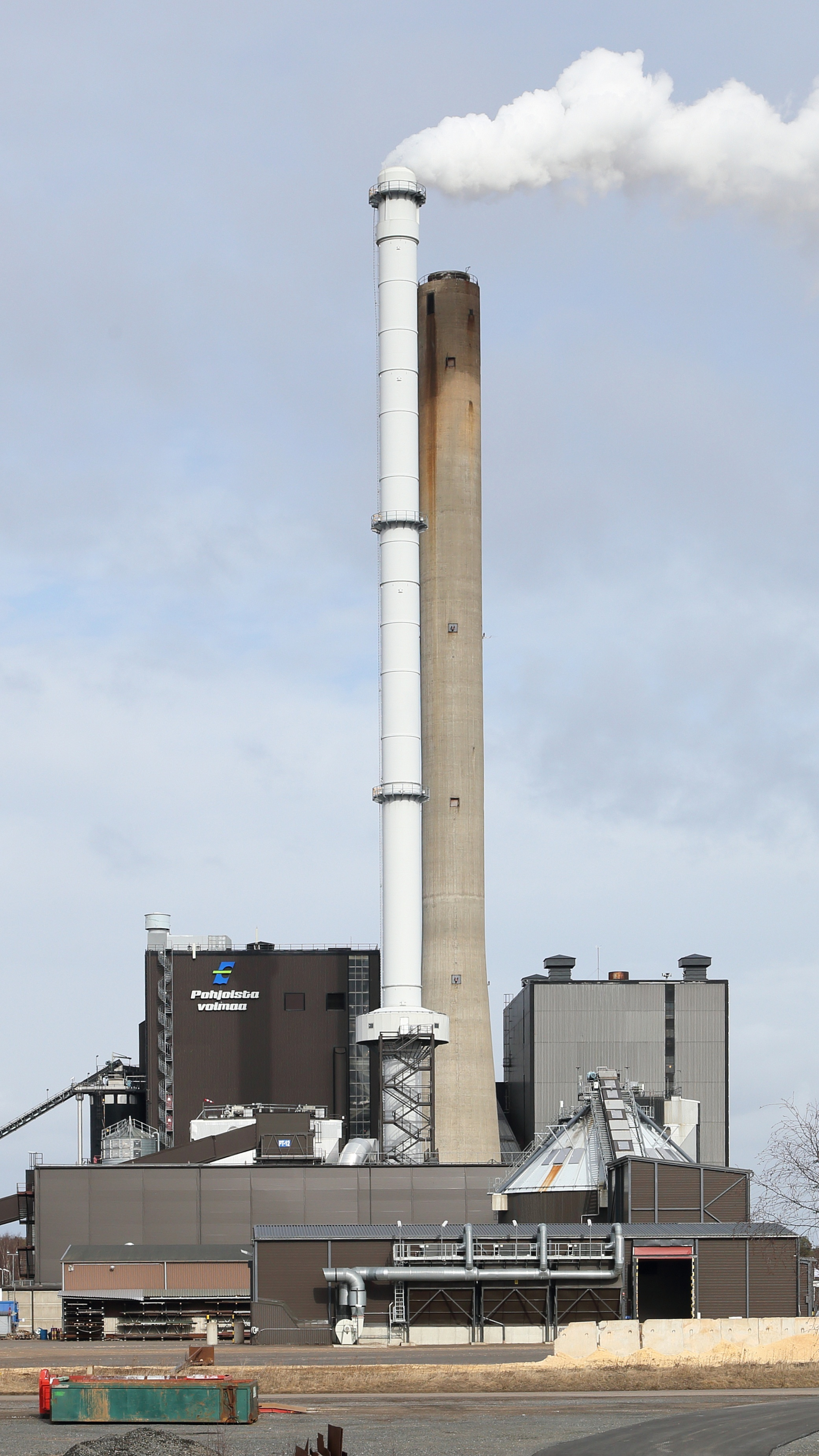
- Country: Finland
- Location: Oulu
- Coordinates: 65°02′16″N 25°26′10″E
- Status: Operational
- Commission date: 1977
- Owner: Oulun Energia

Thermal power station
- Primary fuel: Peat
- Cogeneration?: Yes
- Thermal capacity: 340 MWth

Power generation
- Units operational: 1 × 75 MW; 1 × 145 MW
- Make and model: Zamech; LMZ; Ganz
- Nameplate capacity: 210 MWe

External links
- Commons: Related media on Commons

The Toppila Power Station is a power station in the Toppila district in Oulu, Finland. As of 2019 it is one of the largest peat-fired power stations in the world, with an installed capacity of 210 MW of electric power and 340 MW of thermal power. The facility operates two units of 75 MWe and 145 MWe. The boiler was supplied by Tampella and Ahlstrom, and the turbines were supplied by Zamech, LMZ and Ganz. The power station is operated by Oulun Energia.

In 2021 an estimated 2 million tonnes of peat was burnt in Finland. The EU is helping to fund a just transition away from this. It is planned to stop burning peat and wood for heat in the 2030s.

== See also ==
- Energy in Finland
- List of largest power stations in the world
- List of power stations in Finland
