= Neova =

Neova (formerly Vapo Oy) is the major peat producer in Finland. In 1984, Vapo was 100% owned by Finnish state. From 2002 to 2005, the Finnforest part of Metsä Group owned 33% of Vapo. This share was expanded to and 49.9% between 2005 and 2009. In 2009 ownership of Vapo was reconstructed to Suomen Energiavarat Oy, owned by EPV Energy (previously Etelä-Pohjanmaan Voima Oy) and several peat energy using companies. In June 2009 Metsäliitto (Finnforest) sold its share to Suomen Energiavarat Oy. In 2012 those responsible include several municipal energy companies e.g. Helsinki, Vantaa, Oulu, Rauma, Seinäjoki, Vaasa and Lahti.

In 2010, Vapo came under media attention after it made an official complaint about one of the officials handling some of its more than 100 applications to new peat collection areas. The official, environmental counsellor Antti Ylitalo, had written public appeals to protect endangered natural bogs (moss, moor). Vapo made a disqualification appeal against Ylitalo claiming that his statements formed a conflict of interests in the official evaluations of Vapo's applications. Ylitalo felt that the disqualification appeal by Vapo infringed his freedom of speech.

According to VTT, in 2005 the major producers in Finland were Vapo Oy (78%) and Turveruukki Oy (10%) followed by Fortum Power and Heat, Kuopion Energia, Alholmens Kraft and Vaskiluodon Voima.

Suo Oy, a subsidiary of Vapo, cultivates reed canary grass in areas no longer used to produce peat. In 2010, it owned 6,500 hectares (16,000 acres) of agricultural land and received €673 000 in agricultural subsidies, the fifth largest agricultural subsidy in Finland at the time. In 2012, it was reported that Suo Oy had received in total some €10 million public financing over ten years for the reed canary grass cultivation. The reed, however, was viewed as a "flop", as it reportedly clogged equipment and remained at best equivalently priced to other products. As a result, most producers had quit.
