= Alholmens Kraft Power Station =

Biomass power station in Ostrobothnia, Finland

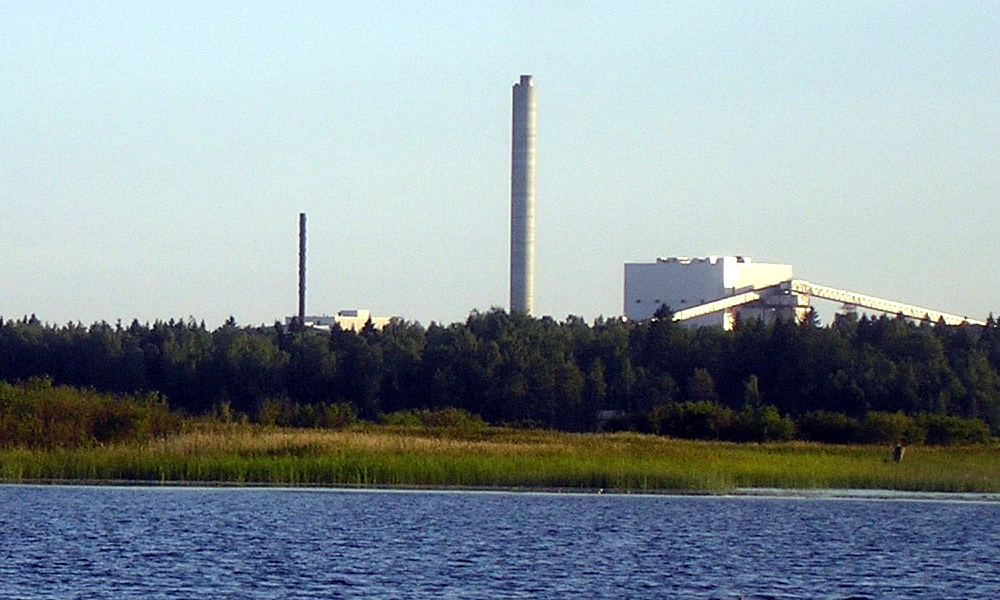
- Alholmens Kraft Power Station
- Country: Finland
- Location: Alholmen, Jakobstad
- Coordinates: 63°42′07″N 22°42′35″E
- Status: Operational
- Commission date: 2001
- Operator: Alholmens Kraft

Thermal power station
- Primary fuel: Biomass
- Secondary fuel: Peat
- Tertiary fuel: Coal
- Cogeneration?: Yes
- Thermal capacity: 550 MW

Power generation
- Make and model: Kværner
- Nameplate capacity: 265 MW

External links
- Website: www.alholmenskraft.com

The Alholmens Kraft Power Station (also known as Jakobstad Power Station or Pietarsaari Power Station) is a biomass power station in Alholmen, Jakobstad in Ostrobothnia region, Finland. It is the largest biomass cogeneration power station in the world.

The power station was commissioned in 2001. It was built next to the existing, now decommissioned power station. The power station is located slightly north of UPM-Kymmene Wisaforest pulp and paper mill in Alholmen. The decommissioned power station had two black liquor recovery boilers, one oil fired package boiler, one bark boiler as well as several steam turbines with the electrical output of 75 MW.

The new power station was designed by Metso and its boiler was manufactured by Kværner. It employs 400 people. The power station has an installed capacity of 265 MW of electrical power. In addition, it provides 60 MW district heating for the city of Jakobstad and 100 MW process steam and heat for the UPM-Kymmene paper mill.

The new power station uses wood-based biofuels (forest residues) as the main fuel. Peat is also used while coal is a reserve fuel. It burns about 300,000 bales of forest residues per year. The power station is equipped with the circulating fluidized bed boiler with capacity of 500 MWth, which is the largest biomass-fired CFB boiler in the world. The operating temperature of the boiler is 545 °C (1,013 °F) and the operational pressure is 165 bars (16,500 kPa).

== See also ==
- Energy in Finland
- List of largest power stations in the world
- List of power stations in Finland
