= Peat in Finland =

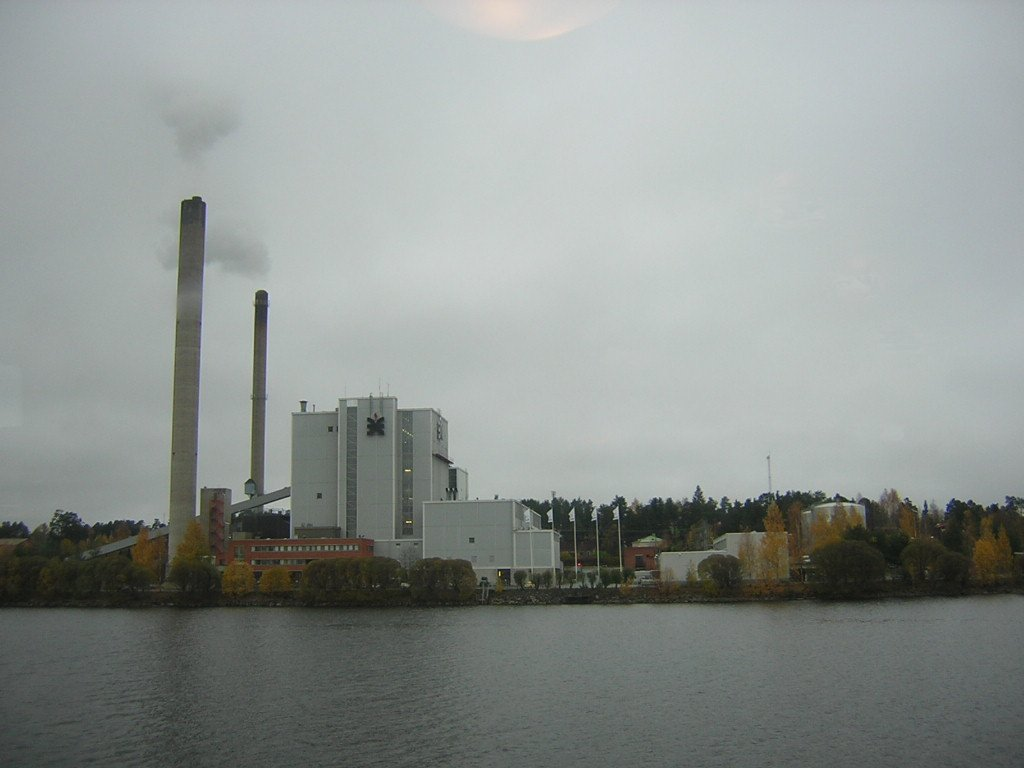
Peat plant in Finland

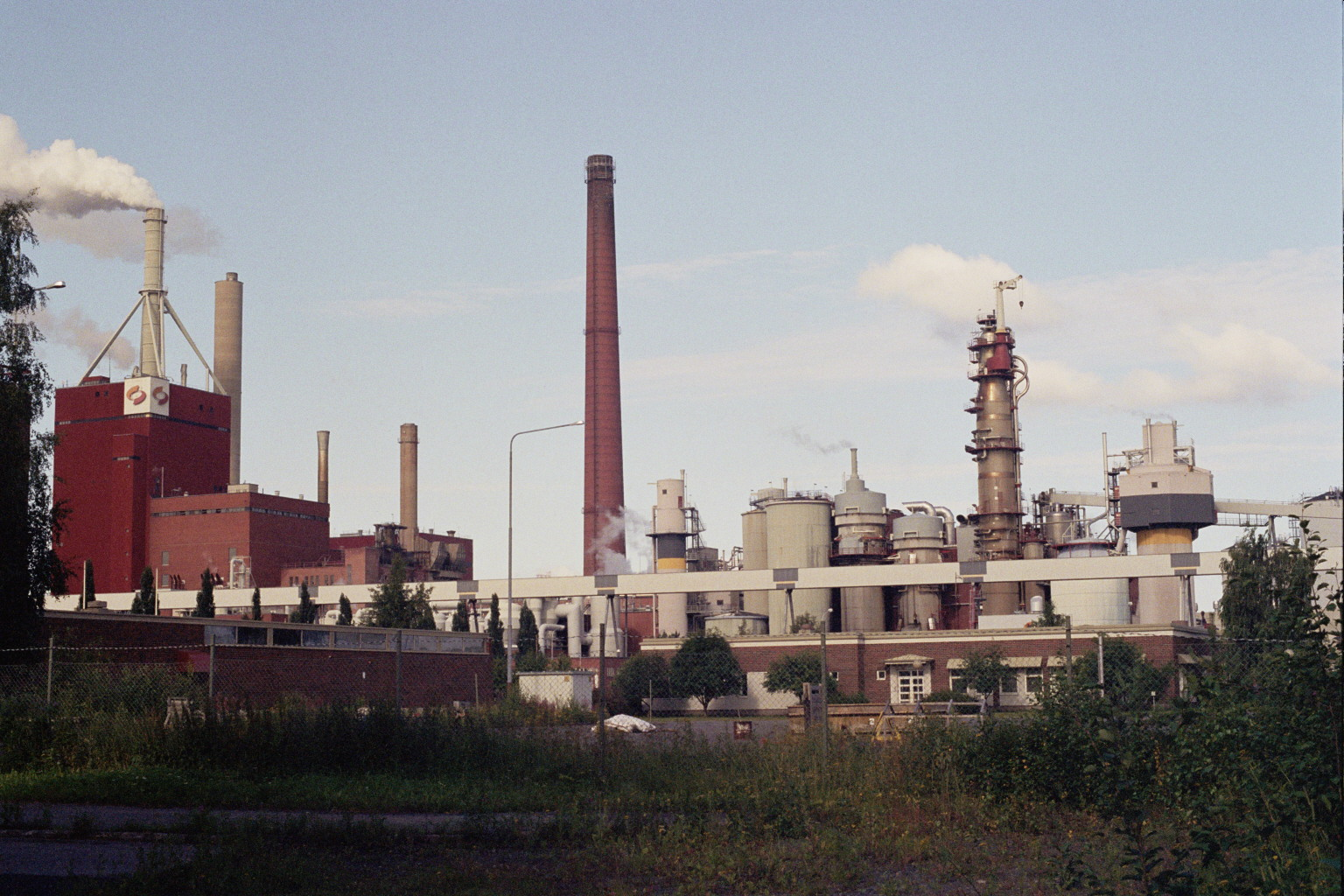
Stora Enso pulp and paper mill in Oulu has capacity of 884 GWh peat fuel energy

Finland is one of the last countries in the world still burning peat. Peat has high global warming emissions and environmental concerns. It can be compared to brown coal (lignite) or even worse than this lowest rank of coal. Peat is associated with high greenhouse gas emissions and has been the subject of environmental concerns in Finland. According to IEA the Finnish subsidies for peat in 2007-2010 undermined the goal to reduce CO_{2} emissions and counteracted other environmental policies and The European Union emissions trading scheme.

Peat plays a notable role in Finland's energy system, representing 2.7% of total energy supply (TES) and 2.9% of electricity generation in 2021.

White peat is used in greenhouses and livestock farming.

== Energy use ==
In 2021 an estimated 2 million tonnes of peat was burnt in Finland.

Finland is set to receive over €465 million from the EU's Just Transition Fund (JTF), representing about 24% of its Cohesion Policy allocation for 2021-2027. This funding is intended to support Finland's objective of attaining climate neutrality by 2035 in a socially equitable manner. The JTF will focus its investments on 14 regions affected by the transition away from peat, aiming to halve peat-based energy consumption by 2030.

After Russia's invasion of Ukraine, the National Emergency Supply Agency established a contingency stockpile for peat, totaling approximately 20% of the peat consumption recorded in 2021.

Peat energy			
Year	Production GWh	Consumption GWh	Share of total Consumption
1990	18,950	15,522	
1991	8,978	15,657	
1992	18,945	15,353	
1993	11,513	16,210	
1994	25,344	18,522	
1995	25,367	20,645	
1996	25,000	23,544	
1997	31,180	23,144	
1998	5,304	22,110	
1999	25,742	19,591	
2000	12,663	17,203	
2001	19,538	23,868	
2002	25,471	24,930	
2003	21,306	27,550	
2004	10,429	24,667	
2005	24,864	19,107	
2006	36,773	26,000	
2007	12,663	28,406	
2008		22,627	
2009		19,929	
2010		25,984	
2011		23 789	6,1
2012		18 432	4,8
2013		16 010	4,2
2014		16 978	4,5
2015		16 108	4,4
2016		15 649	4,1
2017		14 961	4,0
2018		17 188	4,5
2019		15 737	4,2
2020		11 925	3,4
2021		10 625	2,8
2022		10 186	2,8
2023*		6 379	1,7

According to the national energy statistics the energy use of peat grew in Finland in the 1980s: 1975: 0.5 TWh and 1980 4,7 TWh. The share of peat energy was 19 TWh in 2005 and in the peak year 2007 28.4 TWh. In 2006 the peat energy provided 25.3 TWh which gave 6.2 TWh electricity, 6.1 TWh warming and 4.7 TWh industry heat.

== Environment ==
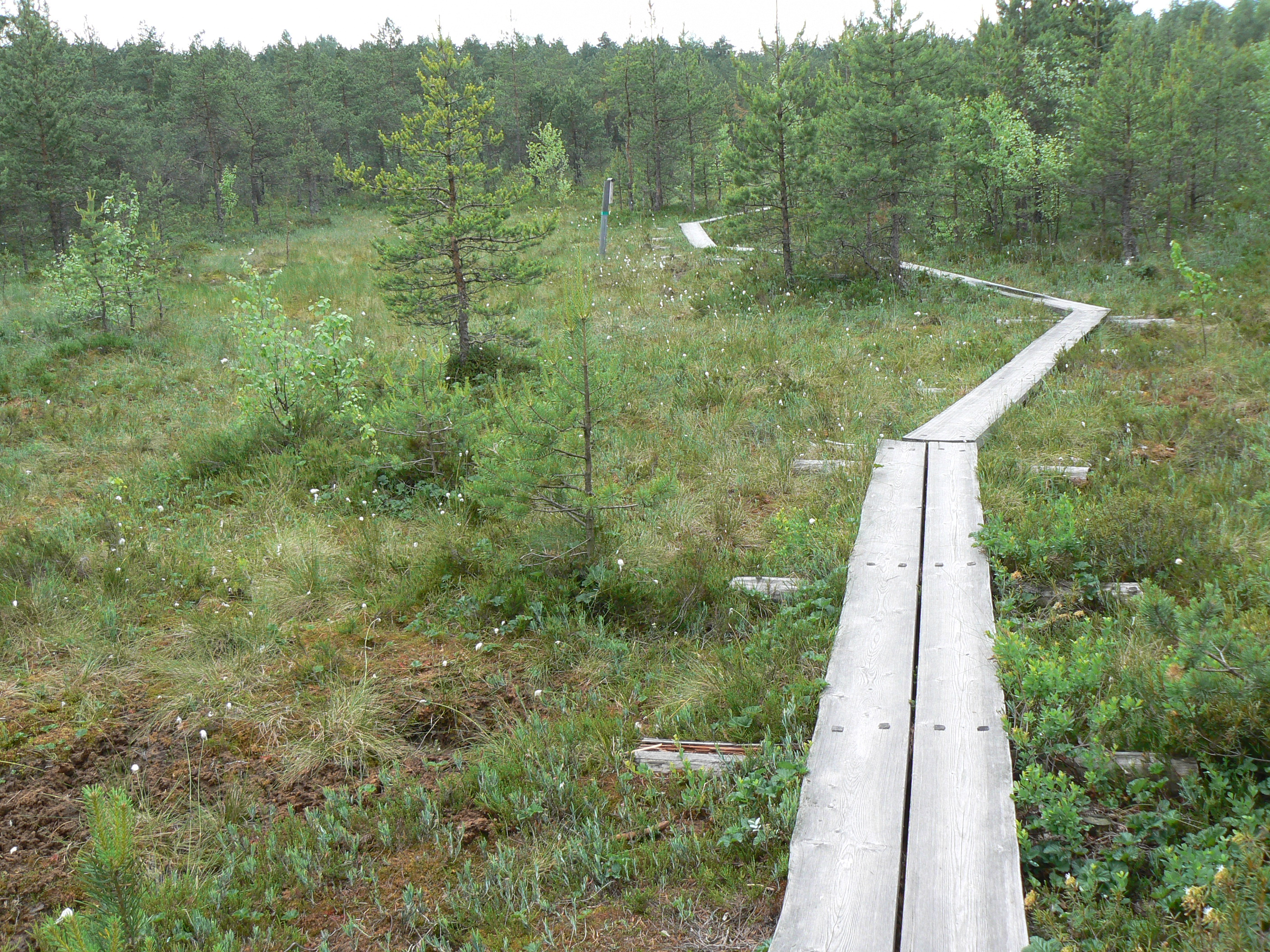
Bog in Finland

Finland's environmental administration has a new project studying water pollution from the peat collection areas. Local people have complained of water pollution. The new studies show 20-fold differences between samples. The EIA counts only the largest particles that are only about 10% of total. The heavy rain showers have been previously ignored. According to evaluations one rain shower could bring as much particles as the rest of the summer.

=== Environmental accident ===
The accidental large water emission from peat collection area in 1981 in Lestijärvi was an environmental wakeup.

== Neova ==
Neova (formerly Vapo Oy) is the major peat producer in Finland. In 1984, Vapo was 100% owned by Finnish state. From 2002 to 2005, the Finnforest part of Metsä Group owned 33% of Vapo. This share was expanded to and 49.9% between 2005 and 2009. In 2009 ownership of Vapo was reconstructed to Suomen Energiavarat Oy, owned by EPV Energy (previously Etelä-Pohjanmaan Voima Oy) and several peat energy using companies. In June 2009 Metsäliitto (Finnforest) sold its share to Suomen Energiavarat Oy. In 2012 those responsible include several municipal energy companies e.g. Helsinki, Vantaa, Oulu, Rauma, Seinäjoki, Vaasa and Lahti.

In 2010, Vapo came under media attention after it made an official complaint about one of the officials handling some of its more than 100 applications to new peat collection areas. The official, environmental counsellor Antti Ylitalo, had written public appeals to protect endangered natural bogs (moss, moor). Vapo made a disqualification appeal against Ylitalo claiming that his statements formed a conflict of interests in the official evaluations of Vapo's applications. Ylitalo felt that the disqualification appeal by Vapo infringed his freedom of speech.

According to VTT, in 2005 the major producers in Finland were Vapo Oy (78%) and Turveruukki Oy (10%) followed by Fortum Power and Heat, Kuopion Energia, Alholmens Kraft and Vaskiluodon Voima.

Suo Oy, a subsidiary of Vapo, cultivates reed canary grass in areas no longer used to produce peat. In 2010, it owned 6,500 hectares (16,000 acres) of agricultural land and received €673 000 in agricultural subsidies, the fifth largest agricultural subsidy in Finland at the time. In 2012, it was reported that Suo Oy had received in total some €10 million public financing over ten years for the reed canary grass cultivation. The reed, however, was viewed as a "flop", as it reportedly clogged equipment and remained at best equivalently priced to other products. As a result, most producers had quit.

== VTT case 2010 ==
VTT used to be a state financed research organization but today it gets a third of its funds from the state and two thirds from the companies. This may create conflicts of interest or the appearance thereof.

=== VTT principles for communication ===
In the summer 2010, one researcher specialist from VTT expressed his/her critics about the reliability of the electricity market report for the parliament. VTT gave him/her a warning since according to VTT the statement was given in the name of VTT and she/he was not qualified for it. This special researcher claims that he acted privately and revealed in general the contradictions of the electricity market report.

=== VTT: Energy tax and scientific freedom ===
The Finnish government ordered an energy evaluation report from VTT for energy tax reform which was published in 2010. VTT report studies the carbon tax for oil, gas, coal and peat. VTT did not give tax recommendations for peat based on its actual carbon load. The responsible director was Satu Helynen. The close relationships of Ms. Helynen and the peat industry associations was revealed.

Satu Helynen denied a VTT scientist to write about peat in autumn 2010. According to the scientist the leaders of VTT tried to prevent them to express in public dissentient opinions about the peat energy tax. Helynen considered the writing onesided and demanded another perspective. The issue came public in August 2010 in a STT (Finnish News Service) interview, when a group of VTT scientists claimed anonyme VTT of pressure.

==== Satu Helynen and peat industry ====
Satu Helynen was a member of Enas board during 2005-2009: a company owned by VTT and two peat energy companies: Vapo and Jyväskylän Energia. Satu Helynen was the chairman of Finbio ry Association until 2009. Finbio was claimed to cooperate with the “Association of Finnish Peat Industries“ and “Peat Producers Association” lobbying members of parliament for peat.

Satu Helynen was a member of the executive board of the International Peat Society (IPS) 2008–2012. IPS is a global non-profit organisation for all interests related to peat and peatlands, having scientific and corporate members in 42 countries worldwide and promoting Wise Use of peatlands. The executive board of the IPS consists of both university and company directors and is elected by an annual assembly of national member associations. In Finland, Suoseura acts as national committee of IPS. In addition to approximately 400 individual members from universities and other organisation; their corporate members are VTT, Vapo, Turveruukki and the Bioenergy Association of Finland.

VTT does not publish or control any economic or board membership commitments of its scientists as at least the members of board of public companies have to do. In medicine publications and conferences the statements of commitments of scientists are normal. Mr. Kari Larjava, e.g. VTT expert in biogas and head of Ms. Helynen, did not know IPS but considered its membership of no relevant problem in regard to commitments.

==== New rules ====
In August 2010 VTT published new principles of its employees' freedom to make public statements. According to Olli Mäenpää, Professor of Administration Law at Helsinki University, the new principles of VTT are in conflict with Finnish constitutional freedom to express one's opinions.

"The new VTT rules deny the right to make any private statements, verbal or written, without permission from the leadership of VTT in the line of activities of VTT. The permission for statements will only be allowed when there is no conflict." In order to guarantee the consistency of research and reliability of the content, the scientists should prevent all criticism of the content of VTT publications publicly after the publications. The ethical rules oblige the research organisation to prevent activities that will mislead the public.

"Finnish law guarantees everyone the freedom of expression as private persons that no organization or person is allowed to restrict. Democratic society has no need to restrict free communication." This freedom covers peaceful communication excluding agitation in crimes or mental troublemaking. In practice, VTT and some other employers including Sanoma Oy (Helsingin Sanomat) have given outsiders the impression of willingness to restrict this freedom included in the human rights declaration of the United Nations.

It "makes your hair stand on end", said Professor Mäenpää. In legal proceedings every employer tends to lose the case. "In practice the attempts to restrict the basic human rights will label these organizations with a negative reputation that is strongly disapproved in public." The ability to question facts and assumptions and the evaluation of report argumentations are cornerstones of scientific discoveries, innovative ideas and sustainable development of society including its politics. Freedom of expression is a cornerstone of democracy and a cornerstone of international human rights declarations.

== Definition ==
As of 2006, the Finnish Ministry of Trade and Industry (KTM) described peat as a "slowly renewable biomass fuel". The definition is from the report: Patrick Crill (USA), Ken Hargreaves (UK) and Mr. Atte Korhola (FIN) Turpeen asema Suomen kasvihuonekaasutaseissa (2000) ordered by KTM. This report has been criticised by several scientists. For example, environment experts and university academics Mr. Raimo Heikkilä (Oulu), Mr. Tapio Lindholm (Helsinki) and Mr. Heikki Simola (Joensuu) wrote an opponent review in 2007. In short: The use of peat fuel releases carbon that was bound long before the industrial revolution. The renewal of peat layers in thousands of years is insignificant compared to the carbon emissions of the peat fuel in regard to the climate change. It is highly questionable to claim that the human created problem would be compensated by a natural process elsewhere. For the greenhouse gas inventories the natural peat lands are basically neutral since storage of carbon equals release of methane. The agricultural land use will never restore the carbon permanently in the ecosystem equal to the original peat layers. There is no difference in the burning of peat or coal in respect to the climate warming. In 1996, the Intergovernmental Panel on Climate Change (IPCC) classified peat as a "solid fossil." Ten years later, they declined to do so again but also refused to classify it as biomass because its emissions are on par with fossil fuels.

Professor Atte Korhola University of Helsinki is married to Eija-Riitta Korhola, conservative member of parliament (Kokoomus) and Member of the European Parliament since 2004. Ms. Eija-Riitta Korhola received campaign financing from the nuclear power industry in 2004 for the 2004 European Parliament election in Finland campaign. Many Finnish nuclear power companies are also peat industry companies.

== International ==
The United Nations Environment and Sustainable Development World Commission Finland expressed in 1989 that Finland should not increase peat production in the 1990s based on its global warming emissions. Finland should discontinue promoting peat energy use and the draining of peat bogs abroad, for example in Indonesia, Brunei and Uganda.

== Global warming ==
Peat and hard coal are the most harmful energy sources for global warming in Finland. According to VTT studies peat is often the most harmful source.

The share of coal and peat of the annual climate emissions (million t CO_{2} and %)
Year	Bio m t CO_{2}	Fossil m t CO_{2}	Coal m t CO_{2}	Peat m t CO_{2}	Coal %	Peat %	Coal and peat total %
1990	19.3	53.1	12.0	5.6	22.6	10.5	33.1
2000	29.4	53.2	9.2	6.5	17.3	12.2	29.5
2004	32.3	64.3	15.8	9.3	24.6	14.5	39.0
2005	30.0	52.8	7.6	7.2	14.4	13.6	28.0
2006	33.9	64.1	15.4	9.8	24.0	15.3	39.3

Use of peat as energy and land is responsible for a third of all Finnish climate change emissions. This includes energy use, agriculture and digging ditches. Digging ditches in peat forests is also one of the major reducers of biodiversity in Finland. According to Statistics Finland use of peat as energy created 8 million tons of CO_{2} emissions in 2018. This includes emissions from peat storage and peat production area. Digging ditches in peatland fields in Finland created 6 million tons of CO_{2} emissions annually. According to Statistics Finland. digging ditches in forest lands in Finland results in 7 million tons of CO_{2} emission annually.

== Carbon storage ==
The storage of carbon in Finland is: bogs 6000 million tonnes, forest soil 1300 million tonnes and trees 800 million tonnes. According to senior lecturer Heikki Simola (University of East Finland) the carbon load from the ditches of bogs is 6000 tonnes pro person annually. In the south of Finland the majority of swamps have been ditched for the forest production. Kyoto protocol do not consider emissions from nature and the emissions from the land use changes.

== Wildlife and biodiversity ==
25% of Finnish plants grow on bogs and 1/3 of Finnish birds live, at some stage, around the bog areas. Biologically there are 60-70 types of bogs. The Finnish language distinguishes the differences: ”letto, neva, räme, korpi, palsa”. More than half of the Finnish bog area had been drained by 2008. Peat collection is the most violent attack for the wild nature. During peat collection, bogs are drained and a layer of peat is stripped to a depth of several meters. Forest is often planted in the area after the peat collection. Regeneration is possible, but the complete regeneration of the bog will take tens of thousands of years. In the USA it was calculated in 2002 (Science 297 950 2002) that wetlands are economically more valuable than agricultural fields. The increase of bog biodiversity support from $6.5 billion to $45 billion can give $4400–5200 billion. economical benefit (in the world).

== New investments ==
Peat is the most popular energy source in Finland for new energy investments 2005–2015. The new energy plants in Finland starting 2005-2015 have as energy source: peat 36% and hard coal 11%: combined: 47%. The major carbon dioxide emitting peat plants during 2005-15 are/will be (CO_{2} kt): PVO 2700 kt, Jyväskylän Energia 561 kt, Etelä-Pohjanmaan Voima Oy (EPV Energia) 374 kt, Kuopion Energia 186 kt, UPM Kymmene 135 kt and Vapo 69 kt. EPV Energy is partner in TVO nuclear plants and Jyväskylän and Kuopion Energia partners in Fennovoima nuclear plants in Finland.

According to IEA country report the Finnish subsidies for peat undermine the goal to reduce CO_{2} emissions and counteracts other environmental policies and The European Union emissions trading scheme. IEA recommends to adhere to the timetable to phase out the peat subsidies in 2010. "To encourage sustained production of peat in the face of negative incentives from the European Union’s emissions trading scheme for greenhouse gases, Finland has put in place a premium tariff scheme to subsidise peat. The premium tariff is designed to directly counter the effect of the European Union’s emissions trading scheme."

In April 2022 Neova said it would restart cutting for peat energy in Finland, due to the reduction in wood imports from Russia.

== See also ==
- Energy in Finland
