= Wind power in Finland =

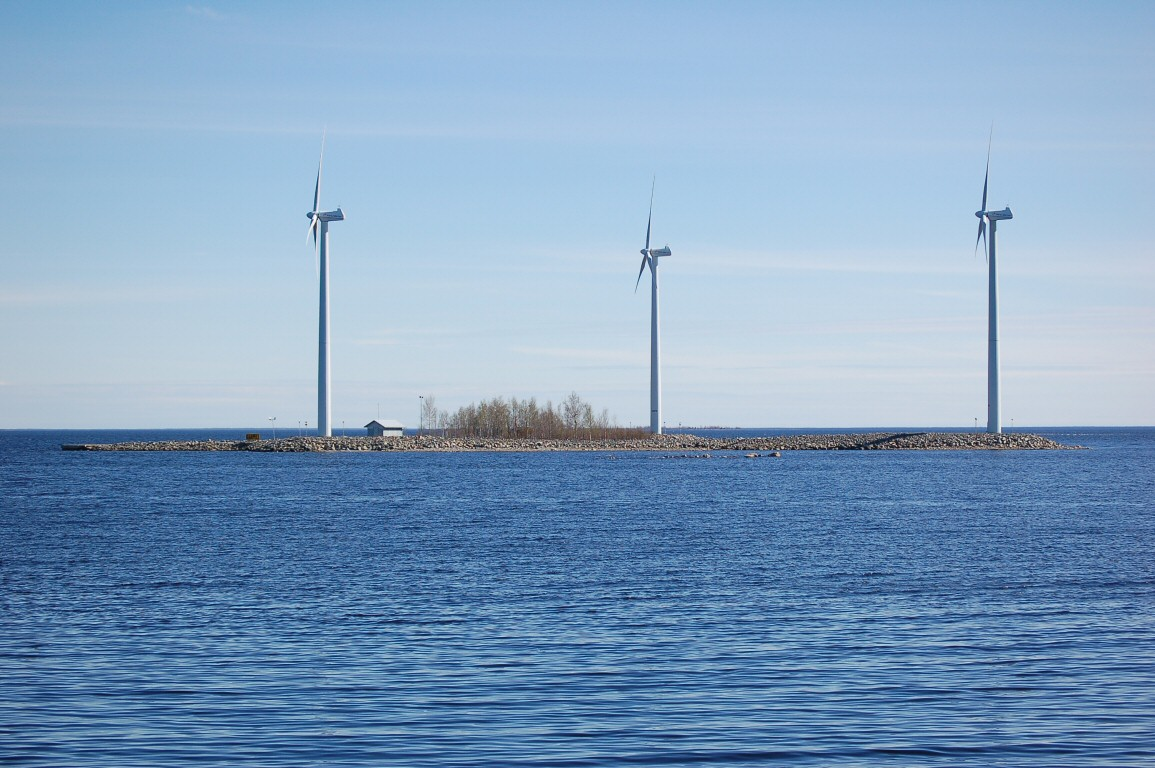
Wind farm in Ii, Finland

Wind power in Finland has been the fastest growing source of electricity in recent years. In 2024, Finland covered 24% of the yearly electricity demand with wind power production, which was 25% of domestic production. Wind capacity was up 20% from the previous year and wind production up 37%. This compares to an average wind power share of 19% in the EU.

By the end of 2022, Finland's wind power capacity reached 5,677 MW with 1,393 turbines installed. That year, wind power production increased by 41% to 11.6 TWh, representing 14.1% of the country's electricity consumption. This growth positioned wind power as the country's third largest electricity source. In 2024 wind surpassed hydropower to become the second largest source behind only nuclear power.

According to a 2018 study done by VTT Technical Research Centre of Finland, published in Nature Energy, new wind power technology could cover the entire electricity consumption (86 TWh) of Finland.

Wind power is one of the most popular energy resources among the Finnish public. In 2022 82% of respondents wanted more wind power, which was second only to solar with 90%. Previous results include 90% in September 2007 and 88% in April 2005. In the Pori area of Finland 97% of people supported wind power according to Suomen Hyötytuuli Oy in 2000.

== Comparison ==
In 2018 the cumulative wind power capacity in Finland was 2,041 MW compared to Sweden 7,047 MW, Ireland 3,564 MW and Germany 59,311 MW. In 2018 there was zero new installed wind power in Finland. The wind energy share of total electricity demand was 6% in 2018. In 2019 Finnish wind installations resumed and by 2023 wind capacity had increased to 5,678 MW.

Wind energy covered 16% of EU electricity demand in 2022. In Europe Denmark had the highest share 55%, Ireland 34%, the UK 28%, Portugal and Germany 26%, Sweden and Spain 25%, as compared to Finland's 14%.

EU and Finland wind energy capacity (MW)
Country	2024	2023	2022	2021	2020	2019	2018	2017	2016	2015	2014	2013	2012	2011	2010	2009	2008	2007	2006	2005	2004	2003	2002	2001	2000	1999	1998
EU+UK^{*}	262,615	249,874	232,992	215,704	203,256	192,231	178,862	168,729	153,730	141,579	129,060	117,289	106,454	93,957	84,074	74,767	64,712	56,517	48,069	40,511	34,383	28,599	23,159	17,315	12,887	9,678	6,453
Finland	8,357	6,943	5,678	3,328	2,586	2,284	2,041	2,113	1,539	1,001	627	448	288	199	197	147	142	109	86	82	82	52	43	39	38	38	17

Includes the UK even after it left the EU. Croatia is included since 2014.

== Growth ==
- Capacity (MW)
- Production (GWh)
Wind power in Finland

After 2017 Finnish renewable energy subsidies lapsed after two years of record growth in wind installations. The government had started negotiations about an auction system to replace them, but did not complete the process before the previous system expired. 2018 was expected to see little growth in wind generation as a result.

In late 2018 the Government held an auction for up to 1.4 TWh of annual renewable electricity generation. All the bids received were for wind projects. In March 2019 the results were announced with seven projects totaling 1.36 TWh accepted. The average winning premium was €2.49 /MWh, with successful bids ranging from 1.27 to €3.97 /MWh.

By 2020 the wind power sector was again booming, but this time without subsidies. Finnish Wind Power Association estimated 18 GW of wind power projects in 2020, with 7% of those under construction and 40% with planning permission. By the end of 2021, more than 1 GW of unsubsidised wind power was to be commissioned, with a further estimated 1.3 GW and 1.2 GW coming online in the next two years.

== Offshore wind ==
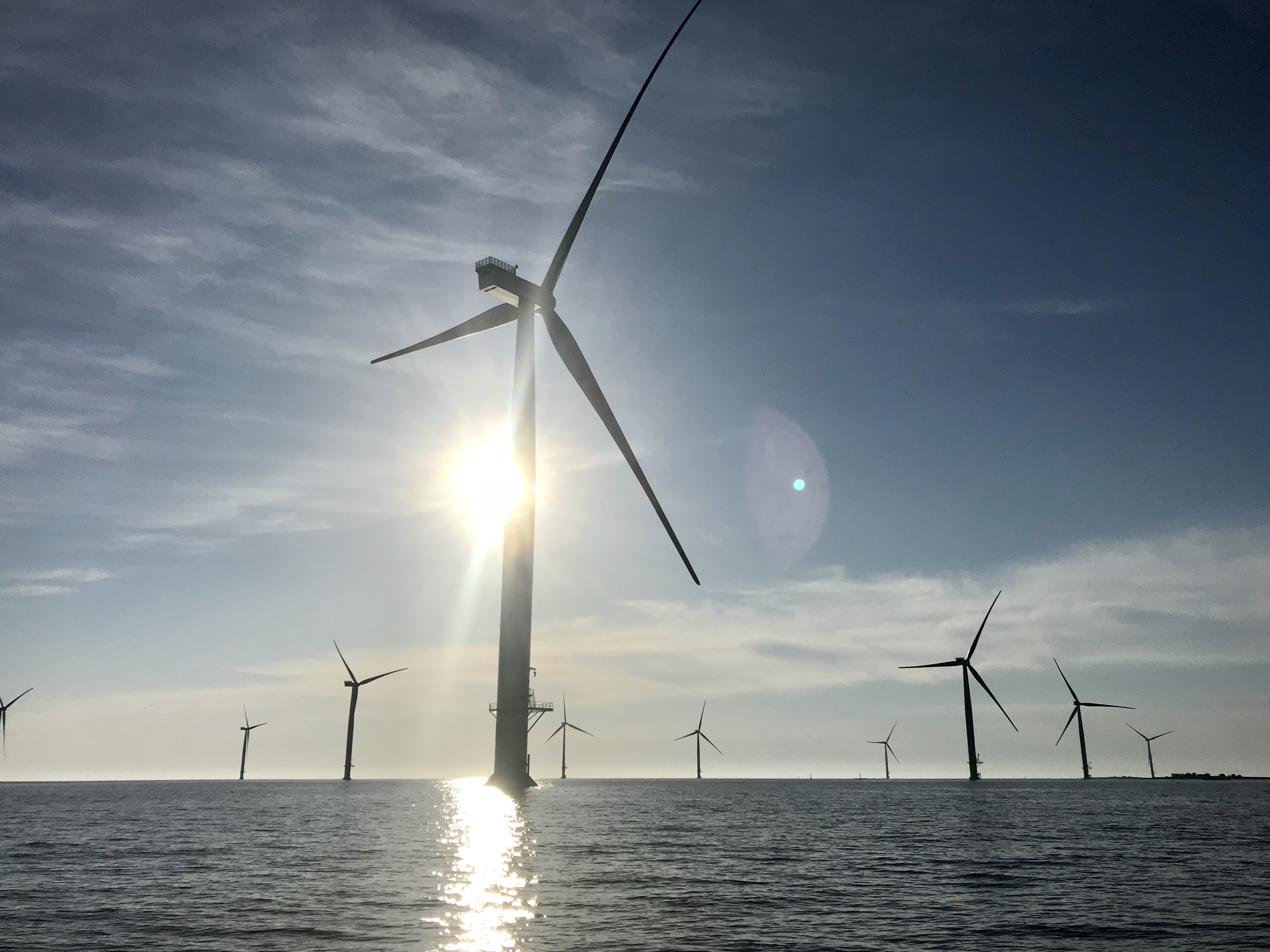
Tahkoluoto wind farm near Pori

Finland has a single offshore wind farm, the 44 MW Tahkoluoto offshore wind farm, owned by Suomen Hyötytuuli. It is located near Pori, with an initial pilot turbine constructed in 2010 and the other ten turbines in 2017. An extension with a further 40 turbines is planned. A demonstration project with two deep water wind turbines received a 30 million grant and is planned to be constructed in 2023-26 before the main extension.

In 2022 Metsähallitus held a tender for an offshore wind farm in Korsnäs. Vattenfall won the tender to construct the 1.3 GW wind farm which is projected to produce approximately 5 TWh of electricity per year. The wind farm is expected to be commissioned in the early 2030s. In late 2023, Metsähallitus and Vattenfall agreed to expand the project area in line with a draft regional plan, allowing up to 2 GW of capacity.

Further auctions are planned for 2023 and 2024, with zones for five offshore wind sites to be leased in Finnish territorial waters by Metsähallitus. An auction for the first two areas totaling 3 GW was announced in late 2023 and was estimated to take a year. A process for the other three areas was to be confirmed in 2024.

In May 2024 the government decided to reject all 16 applications for offshore wind farms outside territorial waters in the exclusive economic zone until new legislation has been passed. Legislation is still being prepared and the fear was that granting applications now would undermine the new law. Exploration is still allowed to continue. This is expected to slow down the projects under development in the EEZ.

== Economy ==
According to EPV Tuulivoima in 2010, a 100 MW wind farm (30 wind turbines) would employ ca 1000 persons.

In 2016, St1 opened the 59,5 MW TuuliWatti at a cost of €140 million. Wind power is partially responsible for keeping electricity prices from rising.

According to Technical University of Lappeenranta wind power became the cheapest power in Finland since March 2017. Power production cost per MWh in 2017 were: wind power €41, nuclear power €42, peat €61, coal €64, wood €76 and solar €100. In 2019 new wind power cost is estimated to be €25 /MWh. In 2019 new wind power will be produced 10,9 TWh in Norway, Sweden and Finland.

== Politics ==
Kimmo Tiilikainen (1966) (Centre Party) was the environmental minister of Finland during 1.10.2007-31.3.2008, while the permanent minister (Paula Lehtomäki, Centre Party) was on a leave. In his preliminary minister comments in September 2006 Kimmo Tiilikainen recommended Feed-in-Tariff for wind power within one year with the objective of 3000 MW wind power in 2020. Finland consumed 90 000 GWh of electricity in (2006).

Municipals receive taxes from wind power. Both Raahe and Kalajoki obtained €1.35 million in taxes from 60 turbines in 2018. According to Wind Power Association for land owners wind power is more profitable than same land as forest use.

In 2014 the government was planning to reduce local municipal income from wind power by taking half of the tax income to the state (tax of real estate). This was suggested since government was afraid that the wind power market was overheated in Finland. The reduced tax was meant to lower interest in wind power investments in the municipalities.

== Gallery ==
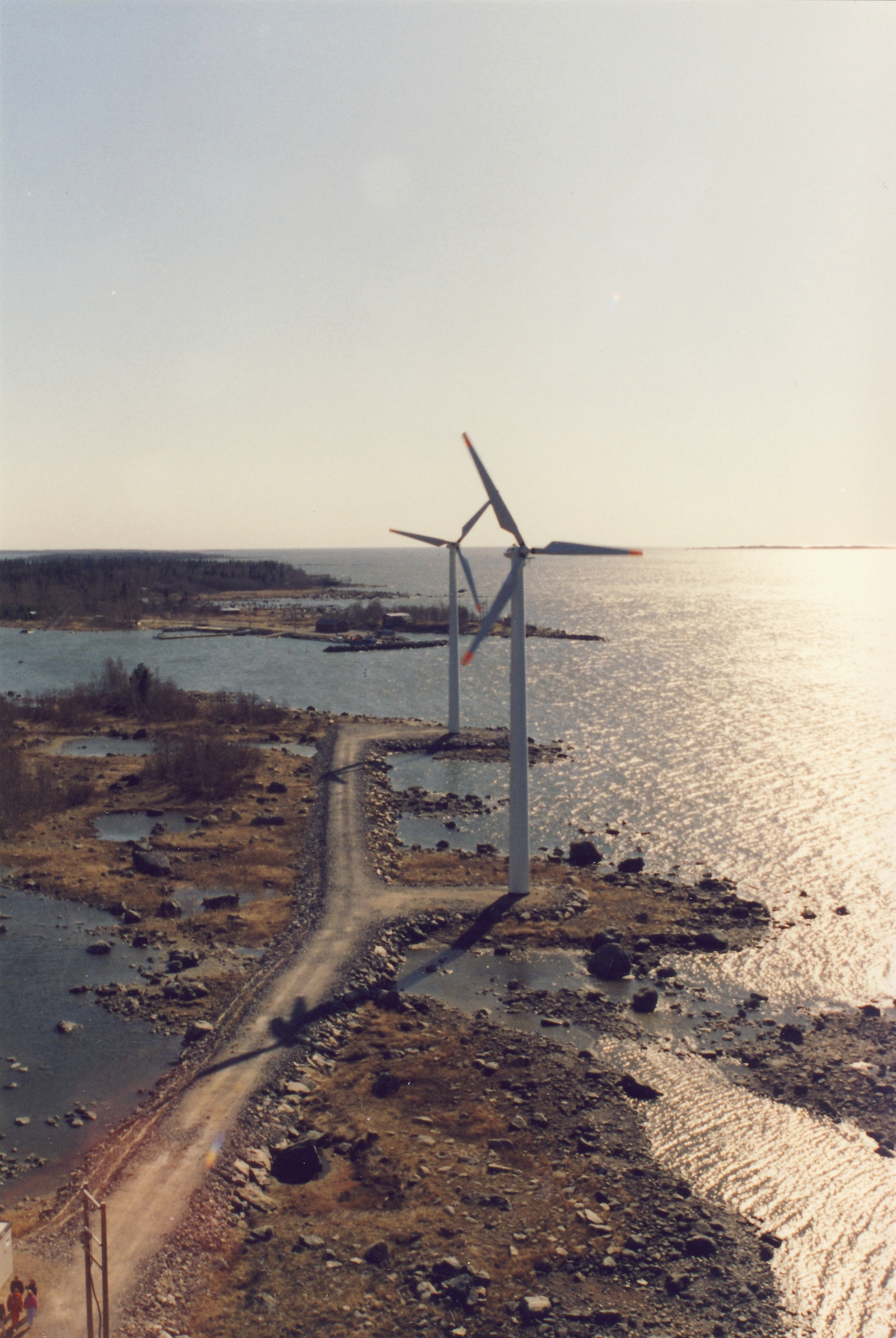
Wind turbines as seen from the top of one in Finland

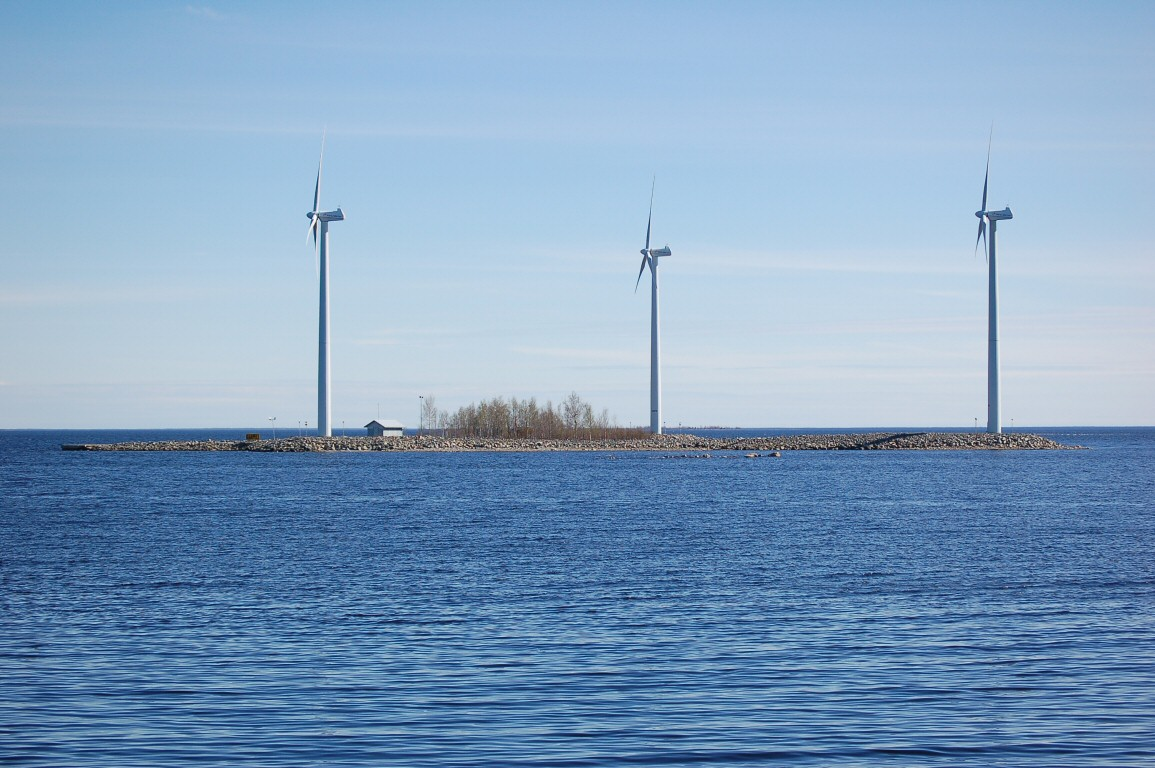
Wind farm in Finland, Ii municipality

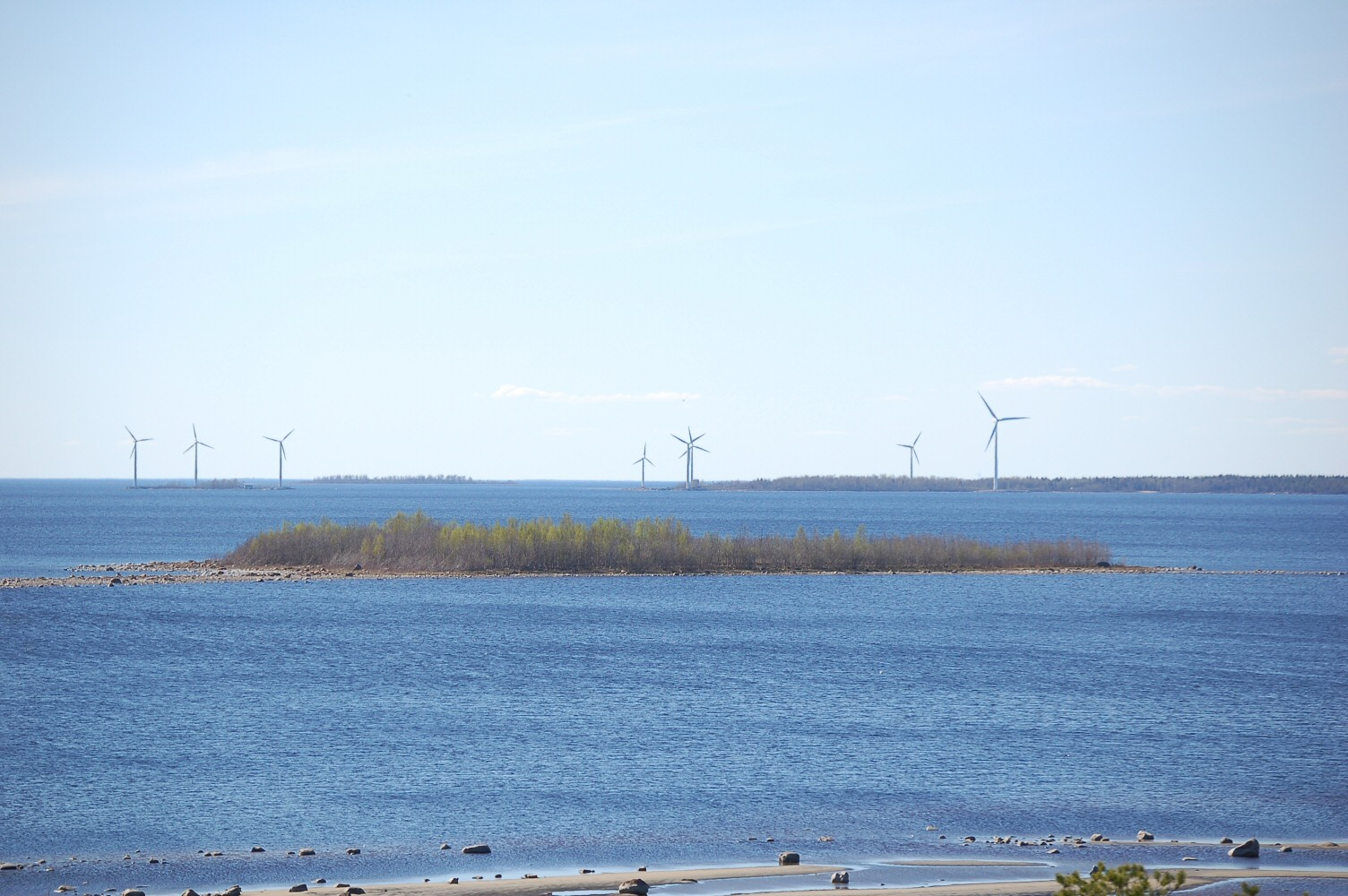
Vatunki wind farm in Kuivaniemi, Ii municipality, Finland.

== See also ==
- Electricity sector in Finland
- Energy in Finland
- Renewable energy in Finland
- Solar energy in Finland
- List of offshore wind farms in the Baltic Sea
- Wind power in the European Union
- Energy policy of the European Union
- Renewable energy commercialization
- Renewable energy by country
