= List of power stations in Finland =

The following page lists all power stations in Finland.

== Non-renewable ==
=== Nuclear ===
Name	Location	Coordinates	Type	Capacity MWe	Operational	Notes
Loviisa Nuclear Power Plant 1	Loviisa	60.3712353°N 26.3470924°E	VVER	488	1977–	
Loviisa 2		60.3703866°N 26.3463843°E	VVER	488	1980–	
Olkiluoto Nuclear Power Plant 1	Olkiluoto	61.2369104°N 21.445806°E	BWR	860	1978–	
Olkiluoto Nuclear Power Plant 2		61.2359708°N 21.4424586°E	BWR	860	1980–	
Olkiluoto Nuclear Power Plant 3		61.2351447°N 21.4358711°E	EPR	1600	2023–	

=== Fossil fuel ===
Name	Location	Coordinates	Fuel	Capacity, MWe	Decommissioned
Hanasaari Power Station	Helsinki	60.181667°N 24.966667°E	Coal	220	1 April 2023
Kellosaari Power Station	Helsinki	60.1620°N 24.9083°E	Fuel oil	118	
Lielahti Power Station	Tampere	61.510417°N 23.675233°E	Natural gas	147	
Martinlaakso Power Station	Vantaa	60.283333°N 24.836389°E	Coal and natural gas	195	Plans to stop using coal in 2026
Meri-Pori Power Station	Pori	61.631667°N 21.406667°E	Coal	560	In strategic reserve until the end of 2026
Naantali Power Station	Naantali	60.457667°N 22.055167°E	Biomass and Coal	256	Units 1 & 2 shut down in 2020
Naistenlahti Power Station	Tampere	61.5098°N 23.7768°E	Natural gas, peat, wood and fuel oil	189	Unit 2 shut down in 2022
Nokia Power Station	Nokia	61.4738°N 21.4947°E	Natural gas	70	
Salmisaari Power Station	Helsinki	60.457667°N 24.903889°E	Biomass and Coal	160	1 April 2025
Suomenoja Power Station	Espoo	60.148333°N 24.718333°E	Natural gas and coal	359	Partial closure in 2020 with shut down of hard coal units planned for 2025
Vaskiluoto Power Station	Vaasa	63.091389°N 21.553889°E	Coal and fuel oil	390	Unit 1 shut down
Vuosaari Power Station	Helsinki	60.2199°N 25.1692°E	Natural gas	630	

== Renewable ==
=== Biomass and peat ===
Station	Location	Geographic coordinates	Fuel	Capacity (MW)	Notes
Alholmens Kraft Power Station	Jakobstad	63.701944°N 22.709722°E	Biomass and peat	265	
Haapaniemi Power Station	Kuopio	62.879167°N 27.675556°E	Biomass and peat	90	
Haapavesi Power Station	Haapavesi	64.1222°N 25.4130°E	Peat	154	
Joensuu Power Station	Joensuu	62.5934°N 29.8370°E	Biomass and peat	50	
Kaukaan Voima Power Station	Lappeenranta	61°04′00″N 28°14′40″E	Biomass	125	
Keljonlahti Power Station	Jyväskylä	62.1923°N 25.7376°E	Peat and biomass	209	
Kymin Voima Power Station	Kouvola	60°54′31.02″N 26°39′45.48″E	Biomass and peat	76	
Naantali Power Station	Naantali	60.457667°N 22.055167°E	Coal, natural gas, peat, biomass and RDF	142	Under construction
Naistenlahti Power Station	Tampere	61.5098°N 23.7768°E	Natural gas, peat, wood and fuel oil	189	
Pursiala Power Station	Mikkeli	61.6753°N 27.2901°E	Wood and peat	62	
Rauhalahti Power Station	Jyväskylä	62.235556°N 25.813889°E	Peat and wood	87	
Seinäjoki Power Station	Seinäjoki	62.7418°N 22.8156°E	Peat and wood	120	
Tihisenniemi Power Station	Kajaani	64.233333°N 27.689167°E	Peat	88	
Toppila Power Station	Oulu	60.164722°N 25.488056°E	Peat	190	
Vanaja Power Station	Hämeenlinna	60.9748°N 20.5053°E	Biomass, peat and natural gas	54	

=== Hydroelectric ===
Station	Location	Coordinates	Capacity (MW)
Imatra Dam	Imatra	61.1667966°N 28.7746954°E	192
Petäjäskoski Dam	Rovaniemi	66.27164°N 25.339816°E	182
Pirttikoski Dam	Rovaniemi		152
Pyhäkoski Dam	Muhos		146
Taivalkoski Dam	Keminmaa	65.932788°N 24.70600°E	133

== See also ==
- Energy in Finland
- Energy policy of Finland
- Electricity sector in Finland
- List of power stations in Europe
- List of largest power stations in the world
