= Solar energy in Finland =

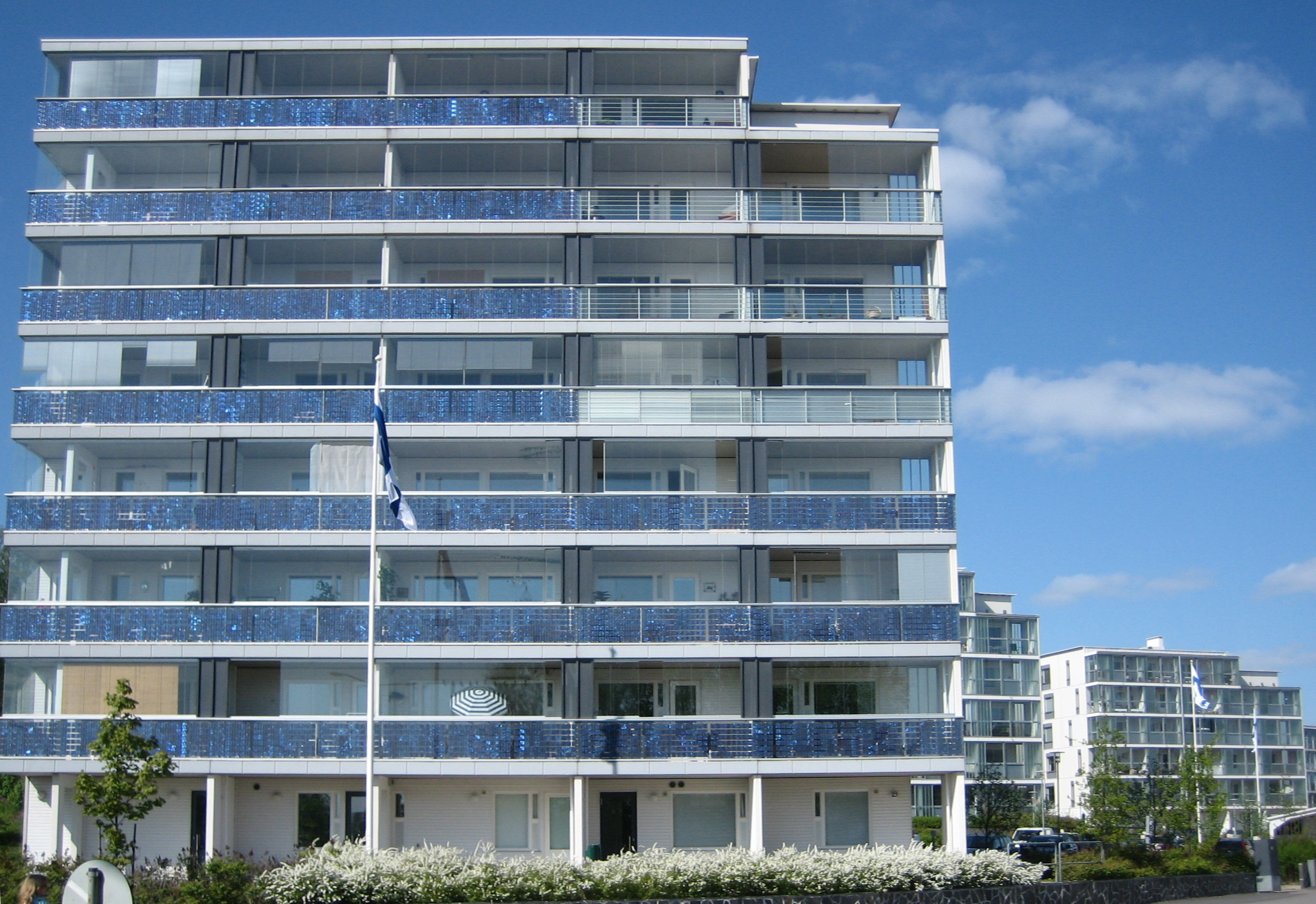
Solar panels in Helsinki

Solar energy in Finland is used primarily for water heating and by the use of photovoltaics to generate electricity. As a northern country, summer days are long and winter days are short. Above the Arctic Circle, the sun does not rise some days in winter, and does not set some days in the summer. Due to the low sun angle, it is more common to place solar panels on the south side of buildings instead of on the roof. Mounting them vertically reduces the average output by 22% from mounting at a 60° angle.

== Photovoltaics ==
The PV capacity of Finland was (2012) 11.1 MW_{p}. Solar power in Finland was (1993–1999) 1 GWh, (2000–2004) 2 GWh and (2005) 3 GWh. There has been at least one demonstration project by the YIT Rakennus, NAPS Systems, Lumon and City of Helsinki in 2003. Finland is a member of the IEA's Photovoltaic Power Systems Programme, but not the Scandinavian Photovoltaic Industry Association, SPIA.

In 2015, the Kaleva Media printing plant in Oulu became the most powerful photovoltaic solar plant in Finland, with 1,604 solar photovoltaic (PV) units on its roof. Although the city of Oulu, located near the Arctic Circle, has only two hours of weak sunlight in December, the photovoltaic cells work almost around the clock in the summer. The cold climate means the PV panels can get up to a 25% boost per hour, as they do not overheat.

Because the sun is quite low in the sky at this latitude, vertical PV installations are popular on the sides of buildings. These solar walls also capture light reflected from snow.

Snow is not necessarily cleared from rooftop solar installations.

== Solar heating ==
The objective in solar heating is 163 000 m^{2} collector area (1995–2010). In 2006 the collector area in operation was 16 493 m^{2}. Solar heat in Finland was (1997–2004) 4-5 GWh and (2005) 6 GWh. Thus, Finland has installed 10% of its objective in 11 years time (1995–2010). The solar heating has not been competitive due to cheap alternatives (electricity, fuel oil and district heating) and the lack of support systems. Companies and public organizations may receive 40% investment subsidies, but private houses do not receive subsidies yet. The Finnish Solar Industries (FSI) group was established in 2001. In 2006/2005 the markets grew 43%. Finland's production capacity is 16 000 m^{2}/a. New installations were: 2 380 m^{2} (2006), 1 668 m^{2} (2005) and 1 141 m^{2} (2004). There are growth opportunities in the solar heating. In 2018 S-Ryhmä decided to order solar panels for 40 of its commercial real estate buildings. This is the biggest solar panel project in Finnish history.

== Statistics ==
Source: NREL

Finland's PV capacity (MW_{p})
Year	Capacity	Installed	% change
2001	2.76	n.a.	n.a.
2002	3.05	0.29	10%
2003	3.40	0.35	11%
2004	3.70	0.30	9%
2005	4.00	0.30	8%
2006	4.62	0.62	16%
2007	5.10	0.48	10%
2008	5.65	0.55	11%
2009	7.65	2.00	35%
2010	9.65	2.00	26%
2011	11.17	1.52	16%
2012	11.17	0.00	0%
2013	11.17	0.00	0%
2014	11.17	0.00	0%
2015	14.7	3.53	31%

== See also ==
- Energy in Finland
- Renewable energy in Finland
- Wind power in Finland
- Renewable energy by country
