= Aidon =

Finnish technology company

Aidon Oy
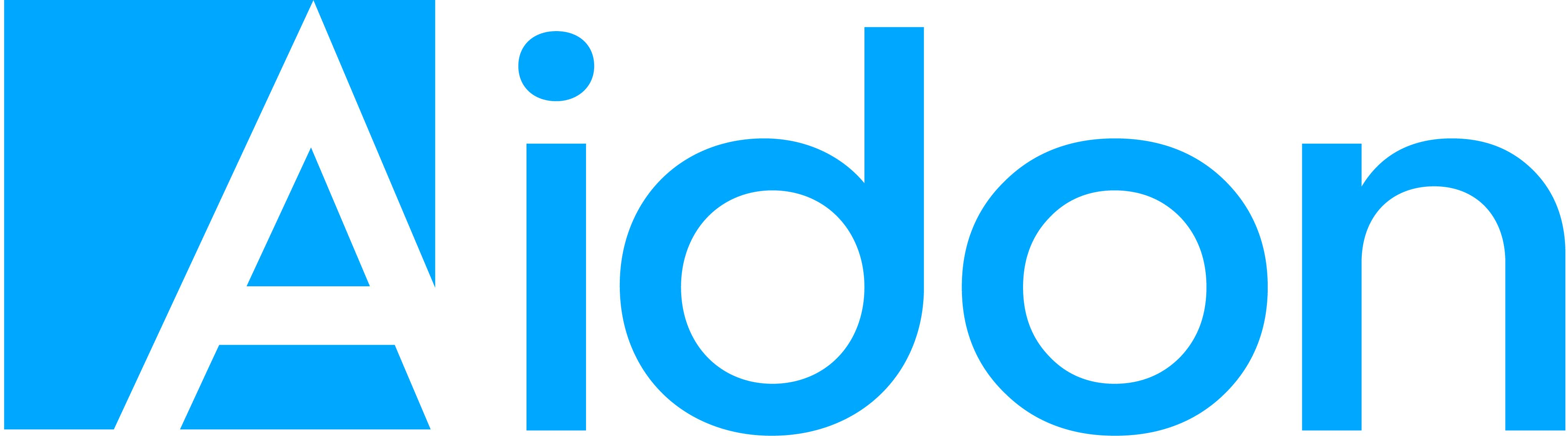
- Industry: Electricity
- Founded: 2004; 22 years ago
- Founder: Timo Chrons
- Headquarters: Jyväskylä, Finland
- Area served: Finland, Sweden, Norway, Denmark
- Key people: Tommi Blomberg (CEO)
- Products: Smart grid Smart metering
- Owner: Independent (2004–23); Gridspertise (2023–present)
- Website: www.aidon.com

Aidon Oy is a Finnish technology company that focuses on smart grid and smart metering solutions and services in the Nordics. Founded in 2004, it is headquartered in Jyväskylä, Finland, with offices in Finland, Sweden, Norway and Denmark.

On November 9, 2023, Gridspertise completed the acquisition of the company.

== History ==
Aidon was founded in Jyväskylä, Finland in 2004 as a seven-person start-up. Since 2004 Aidon has deployed or signed contracts for more than 2.5 million metering points in the Nordics.

== Operations ==
Aidon develops and deploys Industrial Internet and smart grid technology to Nordic energy distribution system operators (DSOs). The company has operations in Finland, Sweden, Norway and Denmark. Currently there some 2.5 million metering points in the Nordics.
