= Metsä Group =

Finnish forest industry group

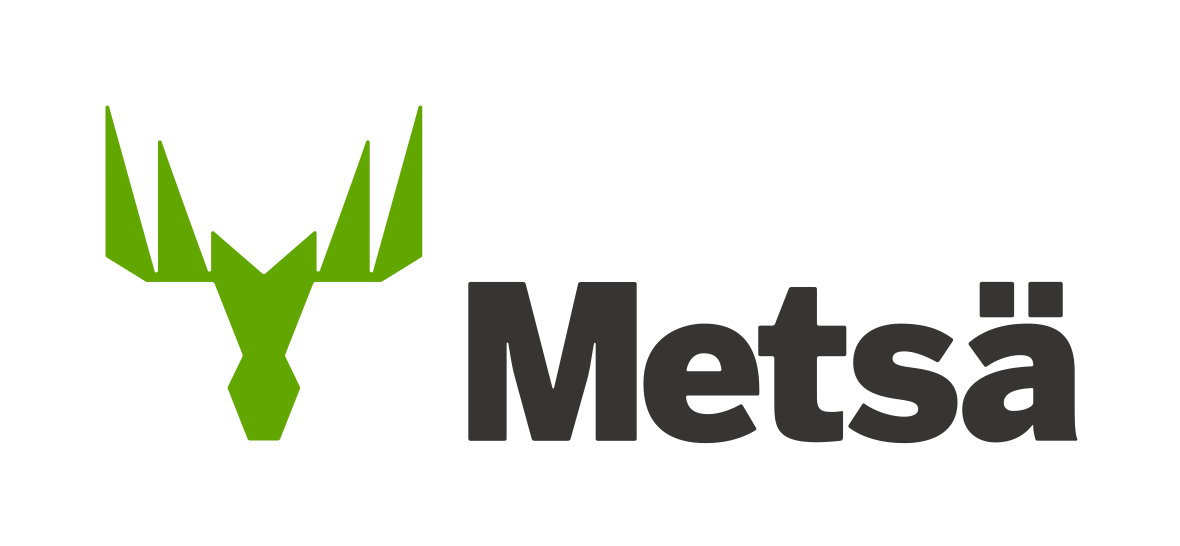
- Company type: Cooperative
- Industry: Forest industry
- Founded: 1947; 79 years ago
- Headquarters: Espoo, Finland
- Key people: Jussi Vanhanen (President and CEO)
- Products: Wood products, pulp, board, tissue and cooking paper
- Revenue: 6,110 million € (2023)
- Number of employees: 9,464 (2023)
- Parent: Metsäliitto Cooperative
- Website: metsagroup.com

Metsä Group (previously Metsäliitto Cooperative) is a Finnish forest industry group present in about 30 countries. Metsä Group's core businesses are tissue and cooking papers (Metsä Tissue), board (Metsä Board), pulp (Metsä Fibre), wood products (Metsä Wood) as well as wood trade and forestry services (Metsä Forest). Metsä Group's sales totalled EUR 6.0 billion in 2021, and it employs approximately 9,500 people.

Metsäliitto Cooperative, the parent company of Metsä Group, is owned by nearly 100,000 Finnish forest owning members.

== History ==
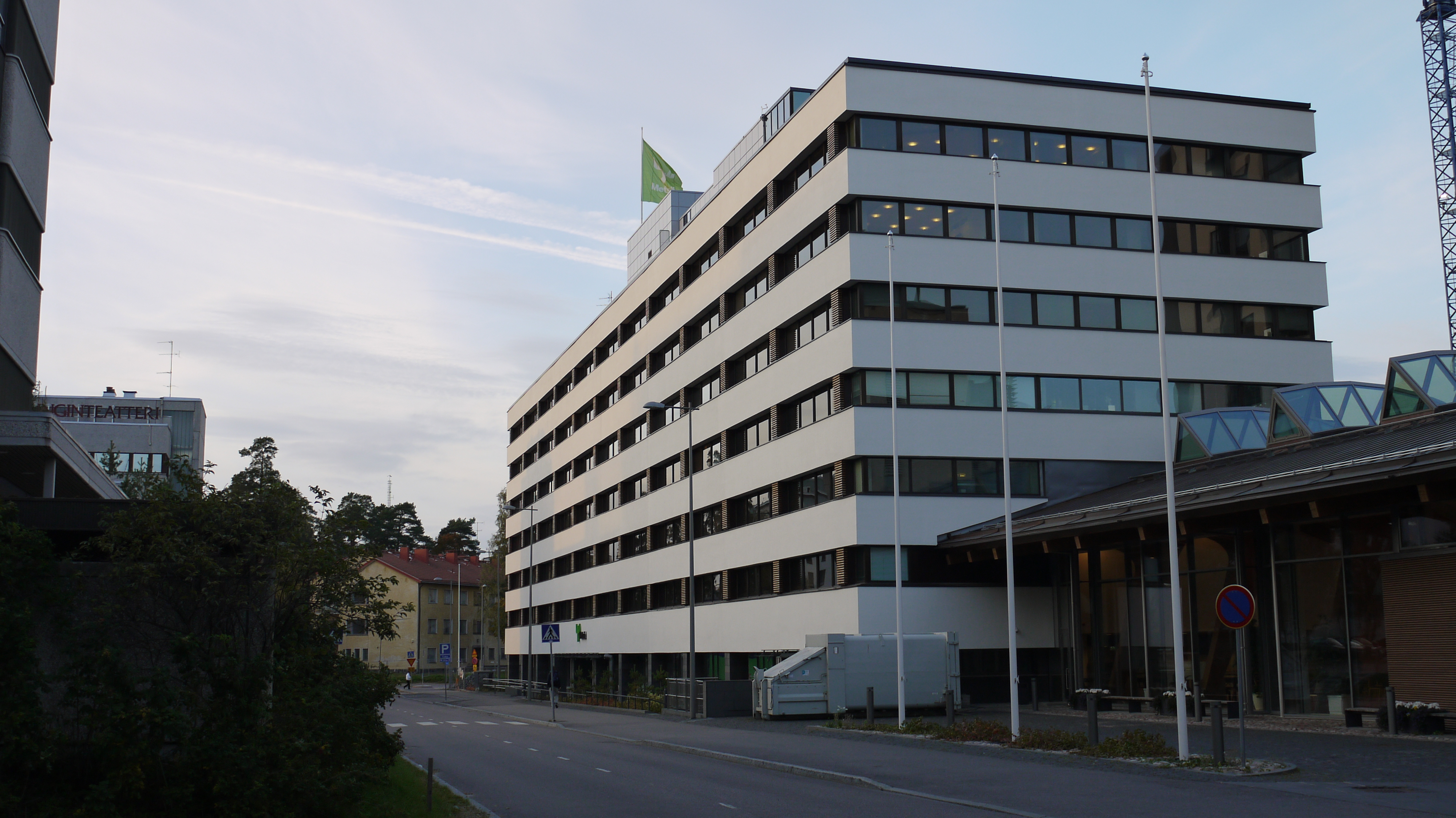
Metsä Group office building

Metsäliitto Cooperative, the parent company of Metsä Group, can trace its origins back to the cooperative movement which started to establish itself in Finland around the beginning of the 20th century. Operations started with shared sales, and Metsäliitto Oy, established in 1934, continued this at first with timber exports. Metsäliitto, which became a cooperative in 1947, started its industrial operations through its own sawmill business, expanding to the chemical forest industry in the 1950s.

The Finnish forest industry grew and internationalised at a brisk pace from the 1960s, becoming one of the pillars of Finnish well-being and prosperity. Metsäliitto's operations also expanded. Important milestones for Metsäliitto included the founding of Metsä-Serla as a result of the combination merger of G. A. Serlachius Oy and Metsäliiton Teollisuus Oy in 1987; and the many growth and development steps in the pulp industry within Metsä-Botnia Oy.

During the strong growth period at the beginning of the 1990s, Metsäliitto continued to make major investments in Finland, but, like many other companies, also aimed at foreign markets. At the beginning of the 2000s, Metsäliitto was an international forest industry group with more than 25,000 employees in dozens of countries. As a result of strong structural changes during the past few years, the Group is now a more compact entity aiming for growth in selected business operations. However, the basis for its operations still lies in the cooperative concept and acting in the best interests of Finnish forest owners.

On March 14, 2024, Metsä initiated a three-week public consultation for its proposed state-of-the-art tissue paper mill in Goole, East Yorkshire, expected to create over 400 jobs and reduce UK tissue imports by 30%. When completed, the facility is expected to produce 240,000 tonnes of tissue paper annually.
