= Metsä Wood =

Finnish wood product company

- Company type: Subsidiary
- Industry: Forest industry
- Predecessor: Finnforest
- Headquarters: Espoo, Finland
- Products: Wood products
- Revenue: € 0.4 billion (2020)
- Number of employees: 1,600 (2020)
- Website: www.metsawood.com

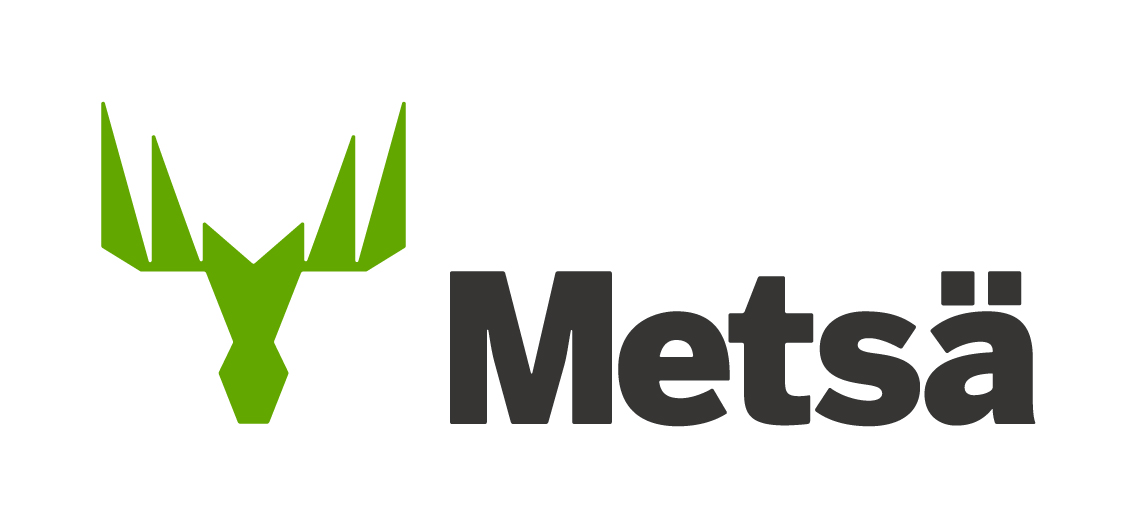

Metsä Wood (formerly 'Finnforest') is part of Metsä Group, which covers the whole wood value chain. It mainly provides engineered wood products for construction, industrial and distribution customers. Metsä Wood's primary products are Kerto LVL (laminated veneer lumber) and birch and spruce plywood.

Headquartered in Espoo, the company employs about 1,600 people.

== Production units ==
- Lohja, Finland: Kerto LVL
- Punkaharju, Finland: plywood and Kerto LVL
- Suolahti, Finland: plywood
- Äänekoski, Finland: veneer
- Pärnu, Estonia: plywood
- King's Lynn, United Kingdom: timber upgrades
- Boston, United Kingdom: timber upgrades
- Widnes, United Kingdom: timber upgrades
