= Hafslund (company) =

Norwegian renewable energy company

Coordinates: 59°55′29″N 10°40′26″E

Hafslund AS

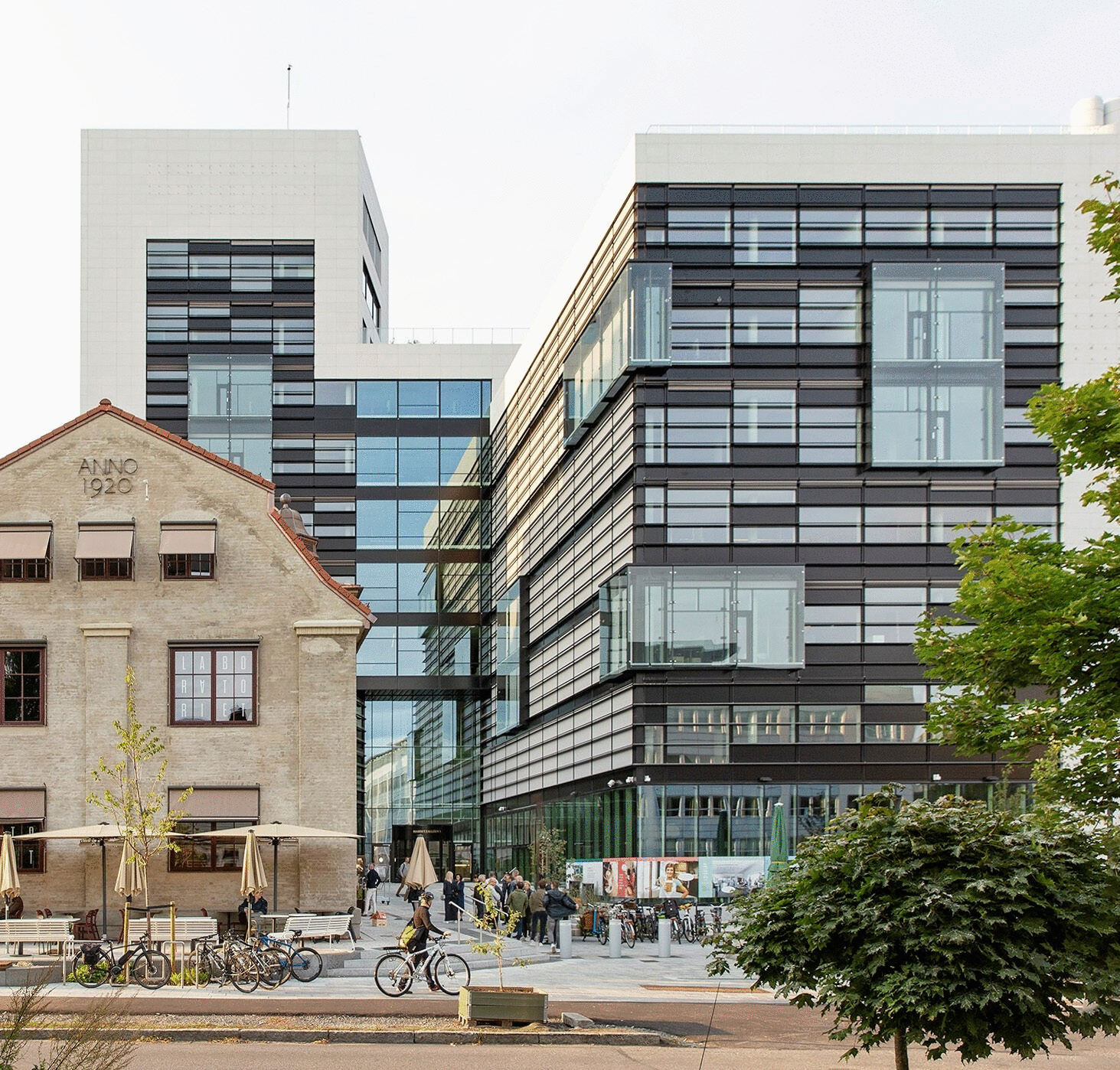
- Company type: Aksjeselskap
- Traded as: (OSE: HNA)
- Industry: Power
- Headquarters: Oslo, Norway
- Area served: Norway
- Key people: Finn Bjørn Ruyter Managing director
- Number of employees: 655
- Website: www.hafslund.no

Hafslund AS is a group with ownership within the power industry. The group is fully owned by Oslo municipality. Hafslund's core business streams are hydropower, with 56 percent ownership in Norway's second largest hydropower company Hafslund E-CO Energi, and district heating, as majority shareholder (60 percent) in Norway's largest district heating company Hafslund Oslo Celsio AS. The group also owns 50 percent of Eidsiva Energi and thereby 50 percent of Norway's grid company Elvia, as well as broadband and bio heat. Hafslund AS also owns 49 percent of Fredrikstad Energi AS. The group has also ownership in Hafslund New Energy with operations within electrification and Hafslund is one of three partners in the offshore wind partnership Blåvinge together with Fred. Olsen Renewables and Ørsted.

Hafslund headquarter is located at Skøyen in Oslo and the group has 655 employees as per June 2022.

== Business areas ==
=== Hydropower ===
Hafslund's hydropower company, Hafslund Eco, owns, operates and maintains hydro power plants, delivers system services to the power system and sells power in the wholesale market. Hafslund Eco owns, fully or partly, 81 hydro power plants in Inlandet, Viken and Vestland with power production equal to 18 TWh. The company operated in total 21 TWh. Since 2017, Hafslund Eco has built four new large power plants in Eastern Norway with power plants in Rosten, Vamma, Nedre Otta and Tolga.

=== District heating ===
Hafslund is majority owner in Hafslund Oslo Celsio, former Fortum Oslo Varme. Hafslund Oslo Celsio is Norway's largest producer of distrivct heating and delivers tap water and heat to more than 200,000 people in greater Oslo. The company operates two waste incineration plants that deliver heat to the district heating production.

=== Ownership in Eidsiva Energi and grid ===
Hafslund has also a significant ownership in grid operations, district bio heating and broadband through 50 percent ownership in Eidsiva Energi. Eidsiva Energi owns 100 percent of Elvia that is Norway's largest grid company with 940,000 customers. Elvia builds, operates, maintains and renews power grid in Innlandet, Viken and Oslo. Eidsiva Energi also owns Eidsiva Bioenergi, which is Norway's third largest district heating provider that delivers 400 GWh heat through own infrastructure to private persons and businesses at Innlandet, as well as Eidsiva Broadband that delivers fiber and broadband to more than 80,000 customers, primarily at Innlandet.

== History ==
=== Origin ===
The Hafslund corporation was founded on 18 March 1898 in order to build Hafslund power plant alongside Sarpfossen at Hafslund in order to supply a carbide factory with electricity. Construction started already in 1896, and the power plant was fully built in 1899 with installed capacity of 5200 kW. In 1907 the power demand had reached above the amount that Hafslund power plant could cover and there was built a transition line to Kykkelsrud power plant. This marked the beginning of Hafslun's expansion. In 1910 all Kykkelsrud shares were transferred to Hafslund and in 1912 and in 1912 Vamma Fossekompani was acquired. Hafslund AS was built with capital from German Schuckert & Co., but in 1916 all shares were bought home. Except from power production, Hafslund had operations within metallurgy, and after buying Nygaard & Co in 1986, Hafslund also had pharmacy business (Hafslund Nycomed, 1986–1996). Hafslund also owned some regional grid and distribution grid.

In the beginning of the 2000s, Hafslund expanded with operations within grid, district heating, contracting services, electricity distribution to end-customers, telecommunication and security services. Contracting services was later a part of the listed company Infratek ASA, whereas the security sercives and telecommunication business was sold out. Hafslund AS has later been through many restructuring processes.

==== 2017: Hafslund ASA is delisted and restructured ====
Hafslund ASA was listed at Oslo stock exchange until 4 August 2017: OSE: HNA (A-shares) OSE: HNB (B-shares). During spring 2017, the two largest shareholders, Oslo municipality and Fortum, agreed to delist Hafslund and restructure the company. Oslo municipality owned 100 percent of the new company Hafslund AS and kept the grid operations as well as the hydropower company Hafslund Produksjon with 90 percent ownership through the hydopower company E-CO Energi AS, fully owned by the municipality. Hafslund strøm, with electricity sale, was transferred to Fortum. The district heating company Hafslund varme and the waste incineration plant at Klemetsrud became one company, Fortum Oslo Varme, with ownership shared between Oslo municipality (50 percent) and Fortum (50 percent).

==== 2018: Hafslund and E-CO Energi become Hafslund Eco ====
On 20 June 2018, the city counsil of Oslo decided to merge Hafslund AS and E-CO Energi AS in a new fully owned company. Hafslund Eco AS was established on 4 July 2018 and brought together hydropower production from Glomma (Hafslund AS) and Aurland, Hallingdal and Valdres (from E-CO Energi AS) in a larger hydropower group.

==== 2019: Hydropower gathered in Hafslund Eco and grid operations in Eidsiva Energi ====
In 2019 Eidisiva Energi and Hafslund Eco agreed to gather hydropower in Hafslund Eco Vannkraft and grid operations in Elvia under Eidsiva Energi. Hafslund Eco got 50 percent ownership of Eidsiva Energi, with Innlandet Energi Holding owning the remaining shares. Innlandet Energi Holding also became minority shareholder in Hafslund Eco Vannkraft. Hafslund Produksjon Holding was not included in the transaction, as the company's power plants were built before the hydropower license regulation was established in Norway.

==== 2022: Fortum Oslo Varme is acquired and the group is renamed from Hafslund Eco to Hafslund ====
In May 2022, Fortum Oslo Varme was acquired by Hafslund Eco, Infranode and HiTecVision. Hafslund Eco became 60 percent owner of the district heating company, which after the transaction is called Hafslund Oslo Celsio. In the same period, the group changed its name from Hafslund Eco AS to Hafslund AS. The acquisition of Hafslund Oslo Celsio received attention since an important premise for the transaction was that it would invest in carbon capture (CCS) at Klemetsrud, the largest waste facility that the company owns and operates. According to the plan, the state, Oslo municipality and Hafslund Oslo Celsio will contribute to financing the carbon capture facility.

== Subsidiaries and partly owned companies ==
In September 2022 Hafslund AS had direct ownership in the following companies:

- E-CO Energi (56%)
- Hafslund Oslo Celsio AS (60%)
- Eidsiva Energi (50%)
- Fredrikstad Energi (49%)
- Hafslund Ny Energi AS (65%)

== Sources ==
- Just, Carl (1948). Aktieselskabet Hafslund : 1898–1948. Oslo: Fabritius & Sønner Trykkeri.
