= Øygarden =

Øygarden may refer to:

== Places ==
- Øygarden Municipality, a municipality in Vestland county, Norway
- Øygarden Group, island group in Antarctica

== People ==
- Eivind Øygarden (1918–1979), Norwegian politician
- Laila Øygarden (1947–2025), Norwegian politician
- Odd Øygarden, Norwegian businessman

== Other ==
- Øygarden FK, a football club based in Øygarden Municipality in Vestland county, Norway
- Øygarden IL, a sports club based in Øygarden Municipality in Vestland county, Norway

== See also ==
- Øygard
