= Storm Amy =

2025 windstorm over northwestern Europe

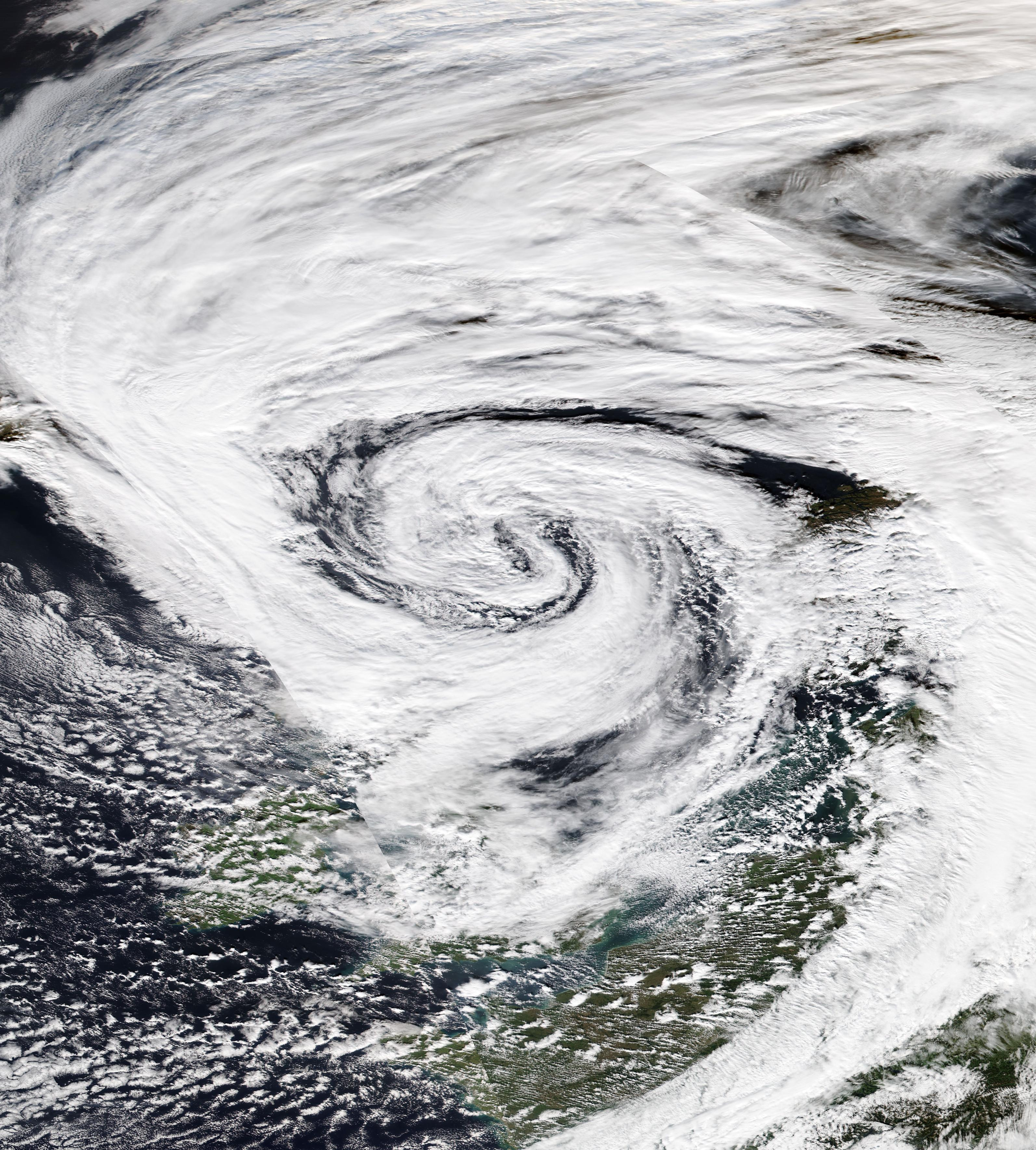
- Amy on 4 October over the Shetland Islands

Meteorological history
- Formed: 1 October 2025
- Dissipated: 6 October 2025

Extratropical cyclone
- Highest gusts: 92.5 mph (148.9 km/h) at Folgefonna, Norway
- Lowest pressure: 942 hPa (mbar); 27.82 inHg

Overall effects
- Fatalities: 4 (Note: France: 2 Ireland: 1 Poland: 1)
- Injuries: 8+ (Note: Norway: 3 Sweden: 2+ United Kingdom: 2 France: 1)
- Areas affected: Belgium, Denmark, France, Ireland, Netherlands, Norway, Poland, Sweden, United Kingdom
- Power outages: 832,000+ (Note: United Kingdom: 430,000+ Ireland: 184,000+ Norway: 150,000+ Sweden: 55,000+ France: 13,000+)
- Part of the 2025–26 European windstorm season

Storm Amy (known as Storm Detlef in Germany) was a powerful extratropical cyclone which impacted parts of Northern and Western Europe in October 2025. The first named (using the western group naming list) storm of the 2025–26 European windstorm season, Amy was named by the UK Met Office on 1 October 2025. The storm caused widespread damage and led to four deaths: two in France, one in Ireland and one in Poland.

== Impact ==
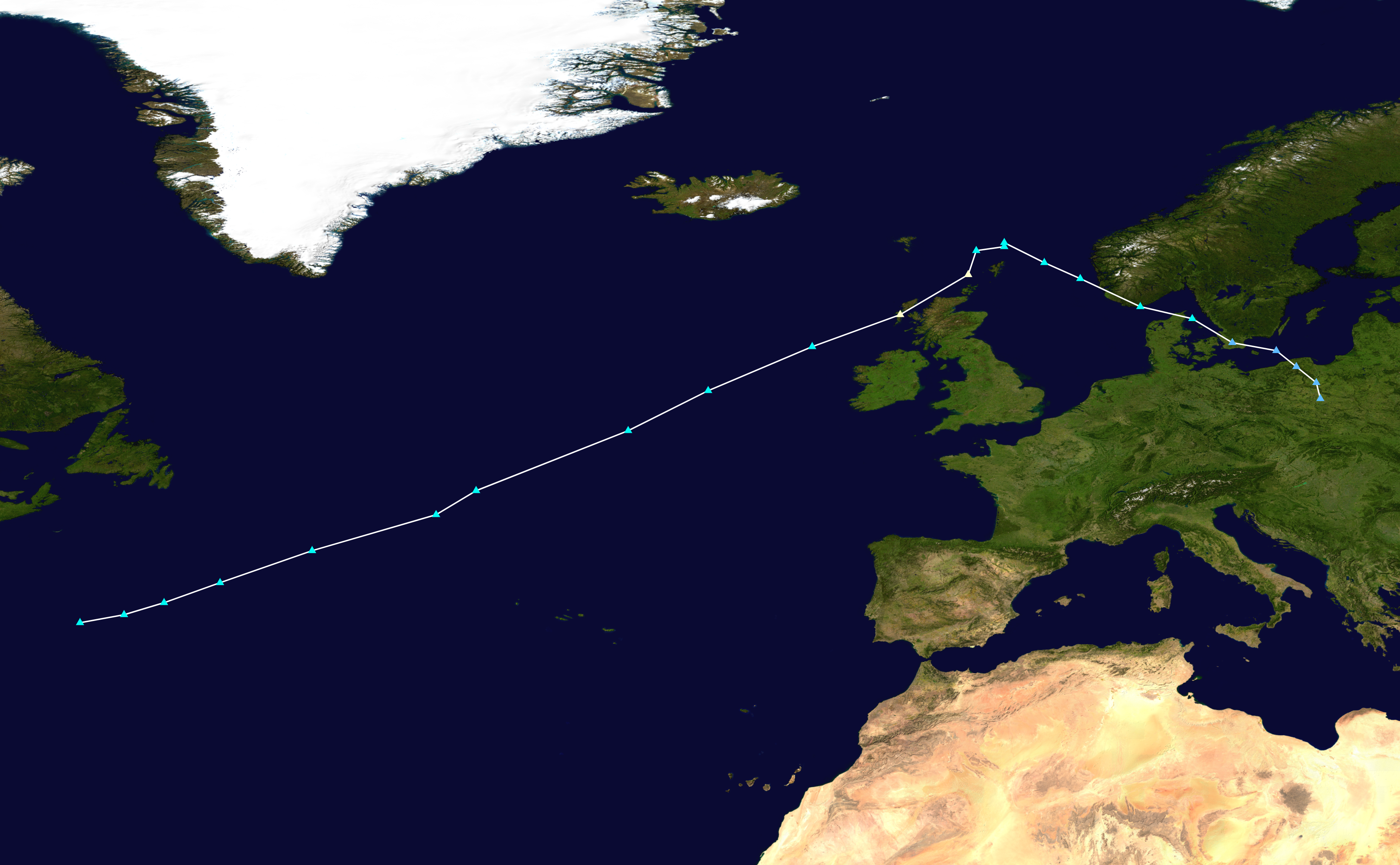
Track of the centre of Storm Amy

=== Belgium ===
On 3 October, the Royal Meteorological Institute issued yellow wind warnings covering much of the country from 8 a.m. on 4 October to 8 a.m. on 5 October.

On 4 October, the fire department in Brussels was called to at least 90 incidents, including scaffolding being blown off an apartment building in Woluwe-Saint-Pierre and a statue falling off its pedestal in Jubelpark. A tree fell onto a van in Kinrooi and damaged some power lines; no one was injured, but some properties lost power. A large tree fell onto the recently-restored beguinage in Hasselt, damaging the roof and façade, and several parked cars were damaged in Aalst after trees fell on them.

=== Denmark ===
On 3 October, the Danish Meteorological Institute (DMI) issued category 1 (yellow) warnings for wind and rain covering most of the country. High-speed trains between Aalborg and Aarhus were cancelled from 11 p.m. to 1:45 p.m. the following day. On 4 October, gusts of 35 m/s (78 mph; 130 km/h) were recorded in Frederikshavn. Riders in the Red Bull King of the Air Cold Hawaii kiteboarding competition in Vorupør took advantage of the storm gusts and high waves on 5 October, and flew 20 meters into the air.

=== France ===
On 3 October, Météo-France placed 55 departments in the northern half of the country on yellow alerts for wind, with some also receiving warnings for rain, storm surges and thunderstorms. The following day, six departments were placed on orange alert for strong winds.

On 4 October, one man died after drowning in Étretat, whilst a tree fell on a car in Aisne, leaving one man dead and another seriously injured. A gust of 134 km/h (83 mph) was recorded in the Baie de Somme as a home had its roof torn off in Hervilly; over 13,000 people were left without power in Normandy, according to Enedis.

=== Ireland ===
On 2 October, Met Éireann issued a Status Orange wind warning for the counties of Donegal, Galway, Leitrim, Mayo and Sligo from 2 to 10 p.m. on 3 October, whilst the whole country was under a Status Yellow warning until midnight. On 3 October, a Status Red wind warning was issued for County Donegal from 4 to 6 p.m. advising residents to shelter in place, whilst a Status Red marine warning was issued between Loop Head and Fair Head from 2 to 8 p.m. Status Orange warnings were issued for Donegal, Leitrim and Sligo counties from 4 to 8 a.m. for 4 October, whilst Clare, Dublin, Galway, Kerry, Louth, Mayo and Wicklow counties were under Status Yellow warnings until midday.

On 3 October, a man died in what gardaí described as a "weather related incident" in Letterkenny as a gust of 92 mph (148 km/h) was recorded at Malin Head. Over 184,000 homes were without power across Ireland, whilst 115 flights were cancelled at Dublin Airport, with 18 others diverted.

=== Netherlands ===
On 3 October, the Royal Netherlands Meteorological Institute (KNMI) issued a Code Yellow warning lasting throughout 4 October covering the provinces of Friesland, North Brabant, North Holland, South Holland and Zeeland. KLM cancelled 70 flights to and from Schiphol Airport for the following day in anticipation of the storm. On 4 October, an oil tanker with 21 crew drifted rudderlessly in the North Sea near the Hollandse Kust Zuid Offshore Wind Farm amid force 9 winds and waves exceeding 5 m (16 ft). Flooding was reported in multiple locations across the country, including in Oudeschild and Vlaardingen. The Code Yellow warning for wind was extended to cover the whole country until the morning of 5 October.

=== Norway ===
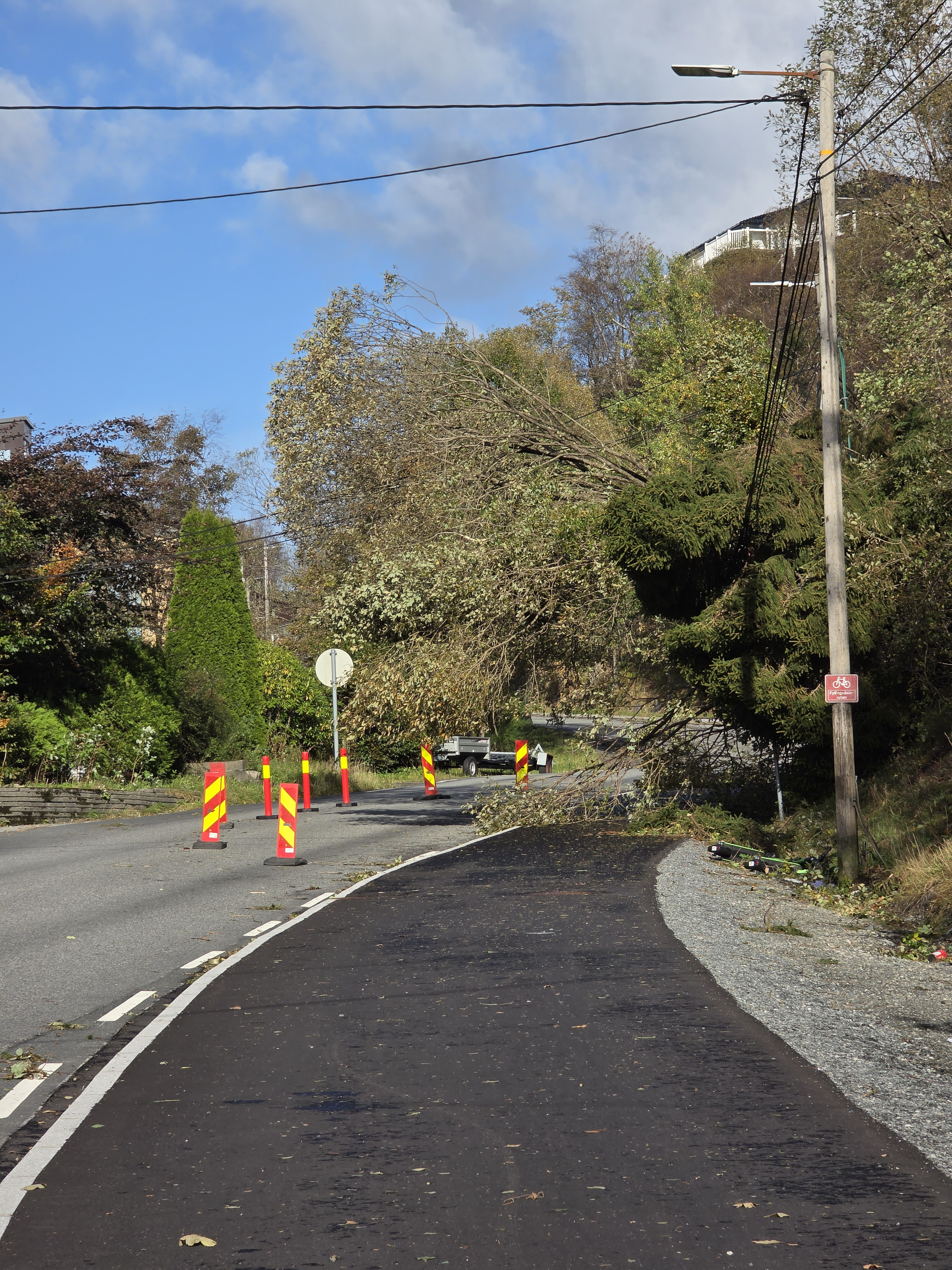
Partial road closure in Øvre Fyllingsveien in Bergen on 5 October

On 3 October, over 14,000 homes in Agder and Vestland were without electricity. Five planes en route to Værnes had to turn back whilst a number of flights were cancelled at Stavanger Airport; overnight trains from Oslo and Stavanger were cancelled and some Color Line ferries were cancelled. Emergency services were called to a Scandic hotel in Bergen where windows on the fourth and fifth floors were about to fall out. The Norwegian Water Resources and Energy Directorate (NVE) issued an orange flood warning for Southern and Eastern Norway whilst the Norwegian Meteorological Institute issued red, orange and yellow warnings for wind and rain.

By 4 October, over 150,000 homes had lost power and there had been nearly 2,500 damage reports. The wall of a VARD shipyard in Tomrefjord collapsed, and roofs were torn off countless buildings, including at Langesund port and a block of flats in Bergen. In Notodden, 27 people were evacuated due to rising water levels in a local river and a waterspout damaged buildings in Oppdal. Over 170 roads were closed across the country and Ørland Municipality was left isolated due to cancelled ferries and closed roads. A number of wildfires were reported across the country due to trees falling onto power lines, including in Bergsøya, Frei, Gjøra and Isfjorden. Winds of 41.5 m/s (93 mph; 149 km/h) were recorded at Folgefonna, whilst wind speeds exceeding 40 m/s (89 mph; 140 km/h) were recorded in six other counties. Police in Trøndelag said at least three people had been injured in incidents relating to the storm in their county. By 10 October, over 11,000 damages had been reported, estimated to cost between 1.5 and 2.1 billion NOK.

=== Poland ===
The storm affected the coastal regions of Poland as it moved over the Baltic Sea, prompting the Institute of Meteorology and Water Management (IMGW) to issue a second-degree storm warning across the Baltic coast and a first-degree storm warning in the Pomeranian and West Pomeranian Voivodeships. On 4 October, a 59-year-old kitesurfer died in Jastarnia when he was lifted from the beach and thrown onto a concrete sidewalk from a height of several meters. A regatta in the Gdańsk Bay was abandoned as strong winds caused several boats to capsize and snapped many masts. In West Pomeranian Voivodeship, the fire brigade recorded 134 interventions between 4 and 5 October, mostly to fallen trees.

=== Sweden ===
On 3 October, the Swedish Meteorological and Hydrological Institute issued warnings. On 4 October, Amy made landfall in Southern Sweden, causing power outages, disrupted communications and fallen trees.

On 4 October, a car on Lisebergbanan at Liseberg crashed into a fallen tree, leaving a number of people on the ride injured. Over 55,000 homes were left without power across the country; Ellevio said Amy had caused the worst power outage since Alfrida in 2019.

=== United Kingdom ===
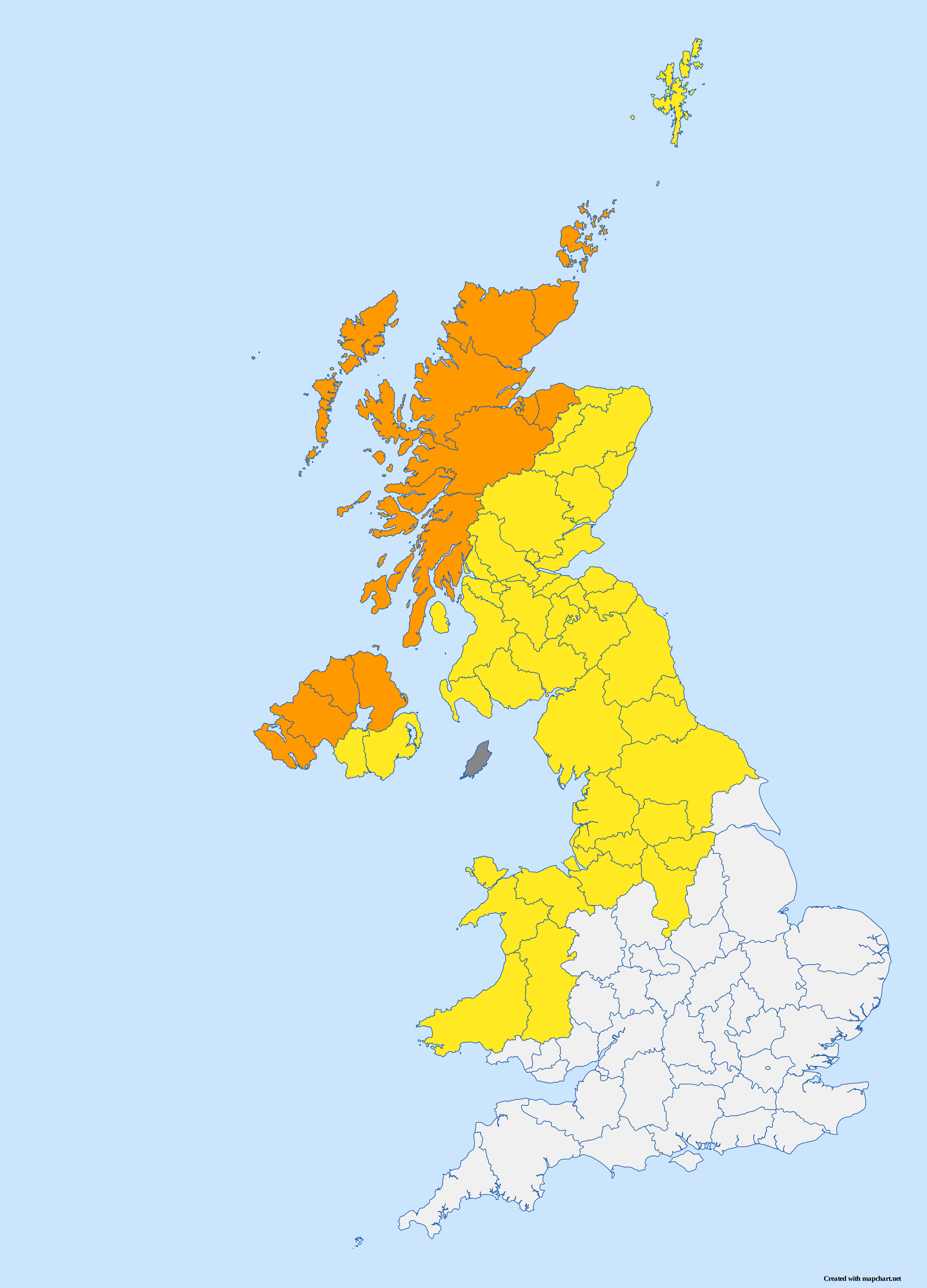
3 October

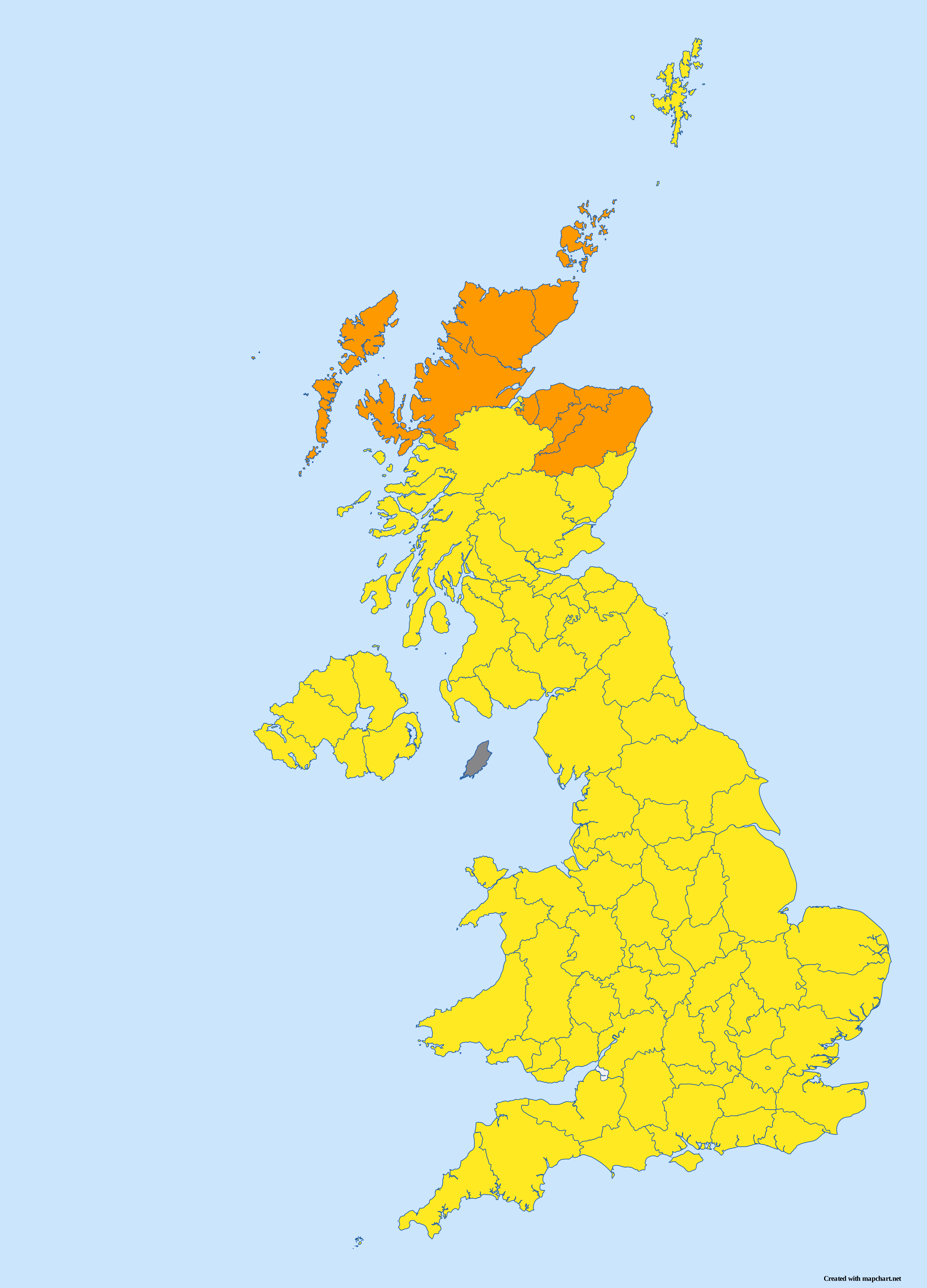
4 October

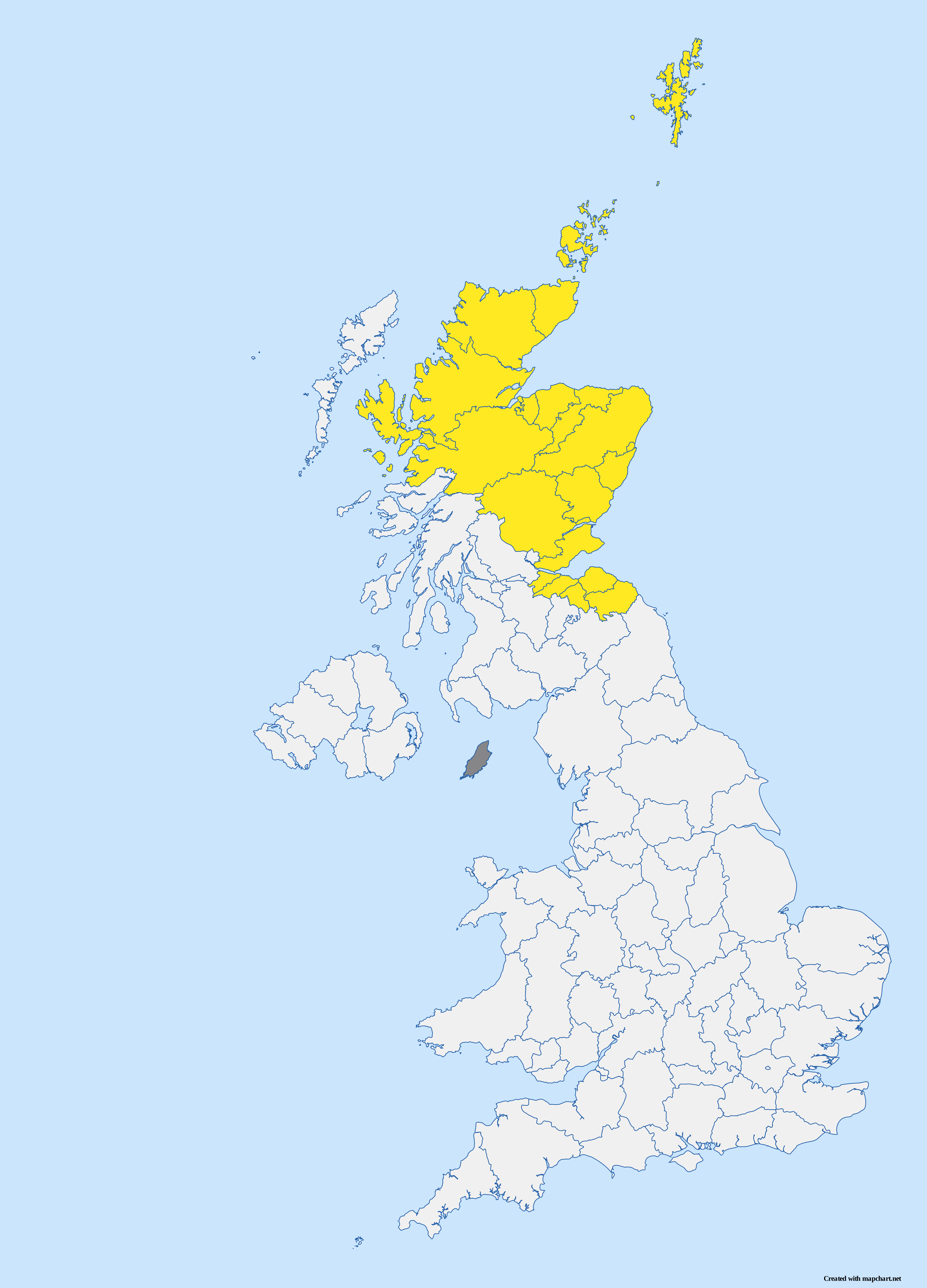
5 October

Weather warnings issued for Storm Amy in the UK

On 2 October, the Met Office issued an amber wind warning covering much of northwestern Scotland from 5 p.m. on 3 October to 9 a.m. on 4 October. A further yellow wind warning was in place across Northern Ireland, Scotland and parts of England and Wales from 5 p.m. on 3 October to midnight on 4 October; a yellow warning for rain was also issued for Northern Ireland and Scotland. According to a report from the Energy Networks Association on 6 October, power outages had affected around 365,000 homes in Great Britain as a result of the storm.

==== England ====
In England, damage was less severe than the rest of the UK, although the River Duddon flooded part of the A595 road and over 1,000 people lost power across Cumbria on 4 October. At Gatwick Airport, strong winds led to 153 flights being delayed, whilst some DFDS ferries between Dover and Dunkirk were cancelled. A tree blocked the railway line between Rye and Ashford International and heavy rain led to flooding at Earlswood railway station. The Patterdale mountain rescue team spent five hours rescuing a group of 13 people from Great Dodd amid winds of up to 80 mph (130 km/h), during which two people were injured; three men were trapped in a cave in the Yorkshire Dales due to flooding for over 30 hours before being rescued by over 100 volunteers with a number of rescue teams, including the Royal Air Force Mountain Rescue Service, Swaledale Mountain Rescue Team, Upper Wharfedale Fell Rescue Association and Cave Rescue Organisation.

==== Isle of Man ====
On the Isle of Man, a yellow weather warning for wind was in place from 4 p.m. on 3 October to 6 p.m. on 4 October. A gust of 89 mph (143 km/h) was recorded at Snaefell on 4 October, whilst wind speeds at Ronaldsway reached 68 mph (109 km/h) twice during the storm. The storm caused widespread disruption on the island, with the Department of Infrastructure saying they responded to 59 reports of fallen trees, including some which fell on cars and houses, and 18 reports of flooding; a landslide blocked a road in Malew and a wall partially collapsed in Laxey.

==== Northern Ireland ====
In Northern Ireland, a gust of 92 mph (148 km/h) was recorded at the weather station on Magilligan, which is provisionally a new record for October, whilst over 65,000 properties lost power. Translink closed all rail lines in Northern Ireland and numerous roads were closed across the country, including the Foyle Bridge and parts of the M1 and M22 motorways. The Education Authority (EA) told schools in the counties of Antrim, Fermanagh, Londonderry and Tyrone to close at midday. A large number of flights were impacted, with 13 being cancelled at Belfast International Airport and another at Derry Airport. The EA said 18 schools had reported incidents to them by midday on 4 October, which were mainly damaged roofs and fallen trees. On 5 October, Northern Ireland Electricity said around 1,500 properties were still without power. Liz Kimmins, the Minister for Infrastructure, said 1,457 incidents, including 1,018 obstructions and over 350 floods, had been reported to her department.

==== Scotland ====
In Scotland, a gust of 96 mph (154 km/h) was recorded on Tiree whilst power cuts were reported in the Highlands. In Glasgow, a derelict building collapsed onto a car amid high winds on Broomielaw, forcing the road to close. A train travelling between Aberdeen and Inverurie hit a fallen tree, leaving around a dozen passengers stranded on the train. The Forth Road Bridge was closed, whilst high-sided vehicles were expected to be prevented from crossing the Clackmannanshire Bridge, Kincardine Bridge, Tyne Bridge and possibly the Queensferry Crossing. The Highland, Kyle, West Highland and Wick railway lines were closed and speed restrictions were placed on all Scottish routes, whilst many ferries from Cairnryan Harbour to Northern Ireland were cancelled. A Ryanair flight from Pisa to Glasgow Prestwick was diverted several times and was in the air for over ten hours before landing at Manchester Airport. The Boeing 737 came close to running out of fuel whilst it was in the air, prompting an investigation by the Air Accidents Investigation Branch.

By 4 October, over 75,000 homes had lost power across Scotland, as Network Rail Scotland said over 170 incidents had occurred across its network. A large sign was torn off a shop near Inverness and the boundary wall at Links Park in Montrose was blown over. Competition at the Alfred Dunhill Links Championship was suspended and some events at the Great Scottish Run were cancelled. The storm had a central pressure of 947.9 hPa (13.748 psi) at Baltasound, setting a new October record in the UK. On 5 October, Scottish and Southern Electricity Networks said they had restored power to 71,000 homes, although 17,000 remained disconnected. Meanwhile, Network Rail Scotland said its teams had attended over 420 incidents, including debris, fallen trees and flooding blocking railway lines. On 9 October, engineers found that the submarine communications cable which brings internet services to Tiree via Tobermory had been damaged during the storm, whilst another submarine cable connecting Shetland to the mainland was damaged on 3 October.

==== Wales ====
In Wales, up to 2,665 properties had lost power by 4 October as gusts exceeded 85 mph (137 km/h). The Severn Bridge was closed in both directions as well as part of the M4 motorway at Kenfig Viaduct. A fallen tree near Gobowen forced rail services to be suspended between Shrewsbury and Wrexham, whilst a number of ferries were cancelled after one sailing from Holyhead to Dublin was stranded offshore for hours.

== See also ==
- Weather of 2025
- 2025 United Kingdom floods
