= Braskereidfoss Power Station =

Hydroelectric power station in Norway

Coordinates: 60.7063°N 11.7918°E

Braskereidfoss Power Station is a run-of-river power station in Våler Municipality in Innlandet, Norway. The station dams the Glomma River and began electricity generation in 1978.

== Production ==
The power station operates a Kaplan turbine with an installed capacity of 22 MW. The average annual production is 130 GWh.

In 2016, the station was expanded with a new building housing an 18 MW Kaplan turbine, increasing production by 40 GWh to 170 GWh.

The owner is E-CO Energi, which has acquired Eidsiva Vannkraft.

== 2023 collapse ==
A 1992 report assessed the dam's safety. A 2018 report concluded that the power station would not withstand overtopping, a situation that arose during the extreme weather event known as Hans.

During Storm Hans on August 9, 2023, a power grid failure at the station led to the turbines shutting down, leaving the upstream water flow unmanaged. The water level began to rise. The automated system that should have activated the floodgates to release excess water failed, causing the water to eventually overtop the dam and flood both station facilities.

The flood caused additional complications upstream of the dam, leading to discussions about blowing open one of the gates. This was not carried out, and later that same day, the situation was resolved when the dam's embankment dam partially collapsed. Once the embankment dam collapsed, water flowed more freely, lowering the upstream water level, which likely minimized further damage.

When the embankment was breached, it also took down one of the pylons holding the high-voltage power line for the dam. On August 10, the cables were detonated to remove the damaged pylon. A new line was reestablished 12 days later.

Hafslund Eco, which owns and operates the facility, announced an investigation to determine why the floodgates failed to open. The dam has five gates, which were inspected in the spring of 2023 without any issues being detected.
