= Fortum =

Finnish energy company

Fortum Oyj

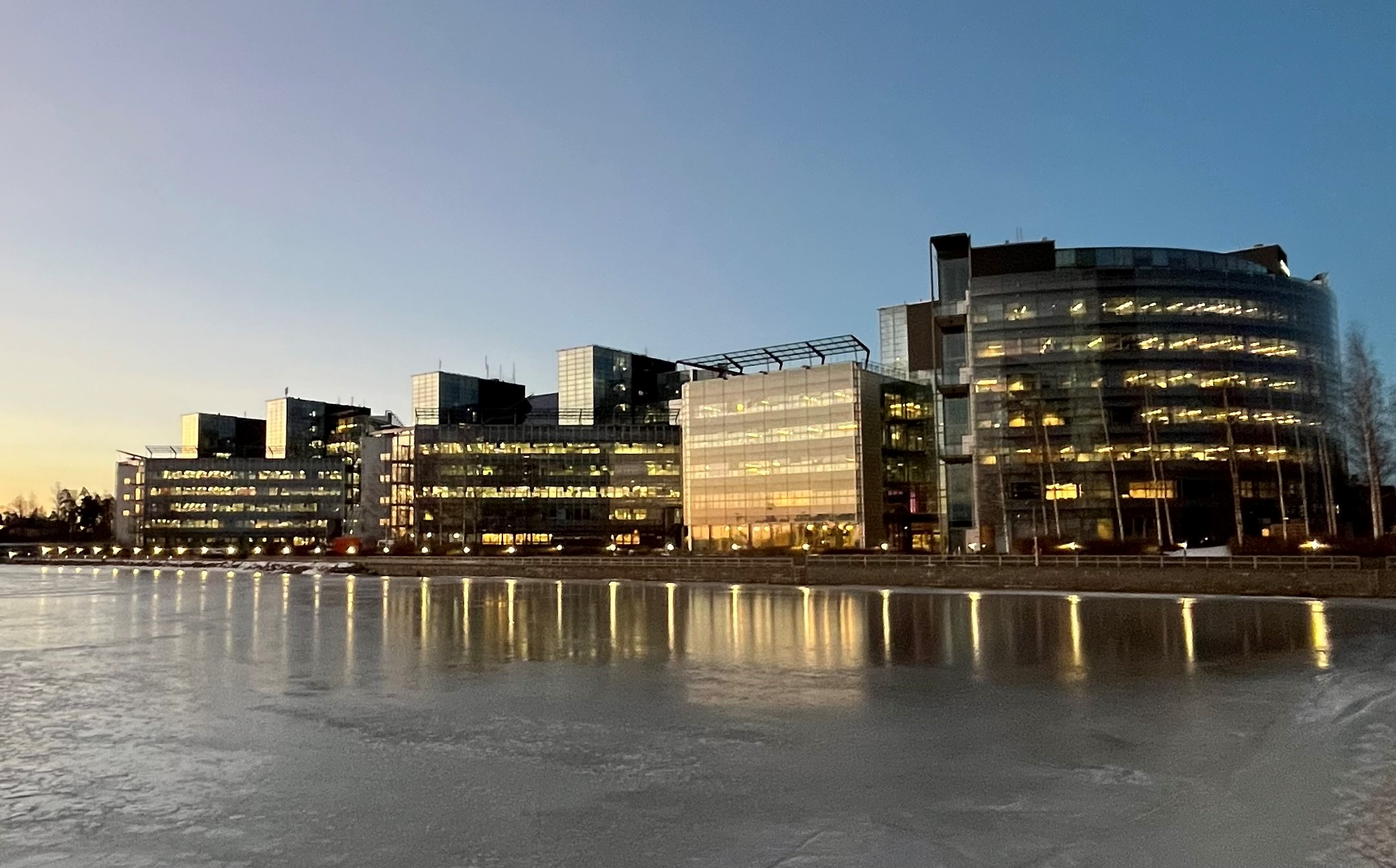
- Fortum's headquarters in Espoo, Finland
- Type: Julkinen osakeyhtiö
- Traded as: Nasdaq Helsinki: FORTUM
- Industry: Electricity
- Predecessor: Imatran Voima (IVO)
- Founded: 1998; 28 years ago
- Headquarters: Espoo, Finland
- Area served: Nordic countries, Poland
- Key people: Mikael Silvennoinen (Chairman); Markus Rauramo (President and CEO); Tiina Tuomela (CFO)
- Products: Electric power, heat
- Revenue: ▼€4,989 million (2025)
- Net income: ▼€763 million (2025)
- Total assets: ▼€16,444 million (2025)
- Total equity: ▲€8,620 million (2025)
- Owner: Government of Finland, Finnish National Institutions (Kela, Keva, State Pension Fund, City Councils of Kurikka, Turku and Kauhajoki) (53.03%)
- Number of employees: ▼4,551 (2025)
- Website: www.fortum.com

Fortum Oyj is a Finnish state-owned energy company located in Espoo, Finland. It mainly focuses on the Nordic region. Fortum operates power plants, including co-generation plants, and generates and sells electricity and heat. The company also sells other energy-related services and products e.g. consultancy services for power plants. Fortum is listed on the Nasdaq Helsinki stock exchange.

== History ==
=== Imatran Voima (1932–1997) ===
The predecessor of Fortum was Imatran Voima (IVO), which was founded in 1932 to operate the Imatrankoski hydroelectric power plant in Imatra. The construction of the Imatra power plant began already in 1922 as well as the power lines from Imatra to Helsinki and the power plant was opened in May 1929. Finnish Government made a decision to establish Imatran Voima Osakeyhtiö (IVO) in May 1932.

Imatran Voima acquired and built a number of other power plants, such as the largest hydroelectric power plants along the Oulujoki river, Ingå and Naantali coal-fired powerplants and the Loviisa nuclear power plant. In 1997, a merger agreement was made between Neste and IVO.

=== 1998–2010 ===
Fortum Corporation was founded in 1998. It was created from the merging of Imatran Voima and Neste Oy, the Finnish national oil company.

In 2003, Fortum bought parts of Fredrikstad Energi and Fredrikstad Energi Nett in a swap deal with E.ON. In 2005, most of Neste's assets were divested into a separate stock-listed company Neste Oil. In 2007, Fortum acquired 25.66% stake in TGK-1, operating in northwest Russia. In 2008, Fortum privatized the natural gas, power and heat generation company TGK-10 (now: OAO Fortum), operating in central and northern Russia.

=== 2011–2021 ===
In 2011, Fortum sold its 25% stake in the Finnish transmission system operator Fingrid. In December 2013, Fortum announced the sale of its distribution network in Finland to Suomi Power Networks, owned by First State Investments (40%), Borealis Infrastructure (40%), Keva (12,5%) and LähiTapiola (7,5%). In 2012, Fortum shared the number one position in the Carbon Disclosure Project's Nordic climate index.

In 2013, Fortum opened two new CHP utilities using waste as a fuel in Klaipėda, Lithuania, and Brista, Sweden as well as new biomass-fuelled CHP plants in Jelgava, Latvia, and Järvenpää, Finland. In June, Fortum acquired a 5 MW solar power plant in the state of Rajasthan in India. In September, Fortum signed an agreement with Rosatom and Rolls-Royce to develop nuclear power. In 2014, Fortum sold its Norwegian electricity distribution network and also its stakes in Fredrikstad Energi and Fredrikstad Energi Nett to the Hafslund Group. The heat business was sold to iCON Infrastructure Partners II, L.P. fund. Since 2015, the electrical distribution network in Sweden is owned by Ellevio. In 2014, Fortum closed its 1,000 MW coal power plant at Ingå, Finland, and demolished it in 2020. In 2015, Fortum connected its first greenfield solar park, under the Jawaharlal Nehru National Solar Mission (JNNSM) Phase II initiative, in Madhya Pradesh.

In 2015, Fortum completed the divestment of its electricity distribution network in Sweden, thus completing the divestment of electricity distribution business. In 2016, Fortum acquired Grupa DUON S.A, an electricity and gas sales company in Poland, and Ekokem Corporation, a leading Nordic circular economy company specialised in material and waste recycling, final disposal solutions, soil remediation and environmental construction.

In 2017, the 100 MW plant in Pavagada solar park was connected to the grid. It was the first of a series of planned gigawatt-scale plants facilitated by reverse auctions in India. In September, Fortum announced it would buy E.ON's 47% stake in German power company Uniper. Fortum increased its stake to 75% in spring 2020. Uniper mainly uses oil, natural gas and coal to supply electricity.

After acquiring a majority stake in Uniper in 2020, Fortum will become one of the EU's worst emitters of greenhouse gas emissions, asserted a report backed by major European environmental groups in 2019. Extinction Rebellion Finland accused Fortum for greenwashing for continuing and scaling up its fossil fuel business, for example opening (through Uniper) Datteln 4 coal-fired power plant in Germany in 2020 and suing the Netherlands on the basis of the Energy Charter Treaty for banning coal.

In 2020, Fortum and Kværner informed that they would cooperate on a Carbon capture and storage project for waste incineration at Klemetsrud energigjenvinningsanlegg. In 2020, Fortum was the biggest company in Finland by its revenue. The majority of its income came from Uniper that became Fortum's subsidiary in March 2020. In 2021, Fortum sold its business in Estonia, Latvia and Lithuania to Partners Group. In 2021, Fortum sold its 50% stake in Swedish district heating and cooling company, Stockholm Exergi. In 2021, Fortum sold the 250-MW Pavagada II and the 250-MW Rajasthan solar power plants in India to Actis, a global infrastructure investment firm.

=== 2022–2025 ===
In 2022, Fortum sold its 50% stake in Fortum Oslo Varme AS, a Norway-based district heating company. In 2024, Fortum announced that it sells its stake in its solar power operations in India and is reviewing its remaining operations in the country. In 2024, Fortum sold its recycling and waste business to Summa Equity.

=== Uniper divestment (2022) ===
On 21 September 2022, Fortum announced that Uniper is to be fully divested to the German state. Under the agreement, Uniper plans to issue 4.7 billion new ordinary registered shares, which the Federal Republic of Germany plans to subscribe at a nominal value of EUR 1.70 per share. The German state-owned bank KfW will provide Uniper with additional liquidity support as required until this EUR 8 billion capital increase is completed. Uniper was thus nationalised by Germany on 21 September 2022 for 8 billion euros.

At completion of the capital increase, the Germans plans to buy all of Fortum's approximately 293 million shares in Uniper for EUR 1.70 per share, i.e. for a total of EUR 0.5 billion. At that point, change of control clause in the financing agreement will be triggered and the buyer will provide the financing for the redemption of Fortum's EUR 4 billion shareholder loan granted to Uniper and the release of the EUR 4 billion parent company guarantee.

The parties have also agreed that Fortum will have a right of first offer in case Uniper intends to divest all or parts of its Swedish hydro and nuclear assets until the end of 2026.

=== Russian assets during the Russian invasion of Ukraine (2023–present) ===
In April 2023, during the Russian invasion of Ukraine, Fortum's Russian assets were transferred under external management by decree of the President of Russia, as a response to the confiscation of Russian property in Europe. Fortum considered the decision illegal and wrote off assets from the balance sheet, recording a loss of 1.7 billion euros. In 2021, Fortum was estimated to have had as much as $32.6 billion in assets in Russia. In July 2023, Russia announced it was changing the name of the Russian business to Forward Energo. In May 2023, Fortum announced that it will write off the value of its Russian assets fully and deconsolidate the Russian operations from the group. In February 2024, Fortum launched arbitration proceedings against Russia, seeking compensation for its assets seized by Russian authorities.

In August 2025, Russian president Vladimir Putin issued a personal decree according to which the Federal Agency for State Property Management takes control of the joint-stock company Chelyabinsk Energoremont (Russian: Челябэнергоремонт, Finnish: Tšeljabenenergoremont), whose entire shareholding was owned by Fortum. Chelyabinsk Energoremont specializes in the maintenance of steam turbines, steam boilers, and electrical equipment, as well as in the repair of power plants.

== Operations ==
=== Hydropower ===
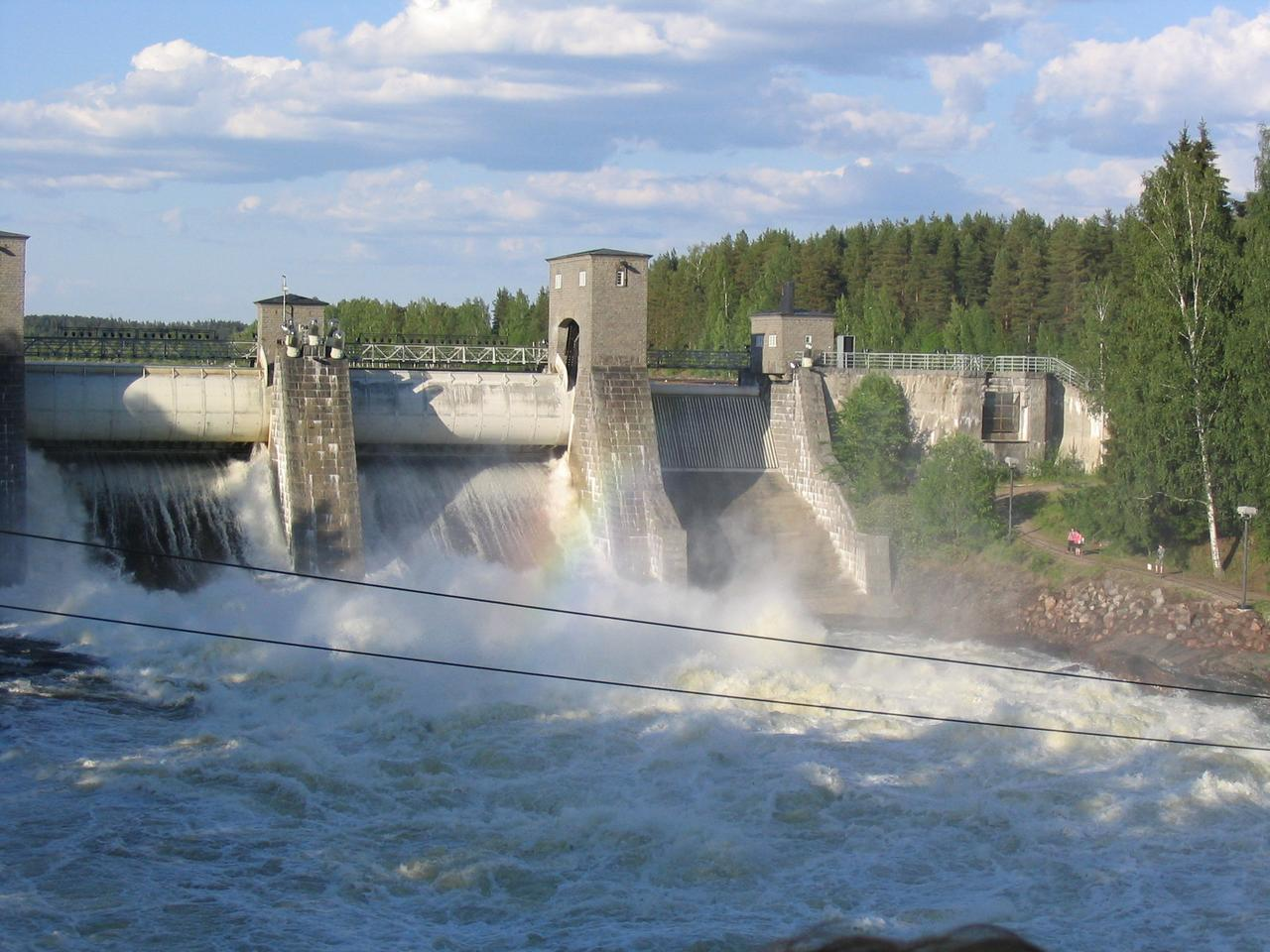
Imatrankoski hydroelectric power plant

Hydropower is one of the most significant renewable electricity production form for Fortum. In 2025, Fortum owned or co-owned over 150 hydropower plants in Finland and Sweden, including power plants on the Dalälven, Indalsälven and Ljusnan rivers in central Sweden and on the Oulujoki, Kemijoki and Vuoksi rivers in Finland.

=== Nuclear power ===
In 2025, Fortum owned the nuclear power plant in Loviisa, Finland. Its nuclear assets also cover Sweden with a 43% share ownership in the Oskarshamn Nuclear Power Plant and 22% of three Forsmark Nuclear Power Plants. Furthermore, Fortum owns a 27% stake in the Teollisuuden Voima, which operates three nuclear power plants at Olkiluoto.

=== Wind power ===
Fortum operates 6 windfarms, in total 730 MW, in Finland, Sweden and Norway.

=== Combined production of heat and electric power (cogeneration or CHP) ===
In 2025, Fortum produced and sold heat in Finland and Poland, owning and co-owning 4 plants combining production of heat (district heating) and electric power. Fortum also owns Meri-Pori coal-fired power plant in Tahkoluoto, Pori. From March 2024 until end of December 2026, Meri-Pori power plant is reserved for National Emergency Supply Agency for severe crisis and disruptions. The plant will be fully closed in spring 2027.

=== Electricity and heat sales ===
Fortum sells electricity, electricity products and services to over 2 million consumers predominantly in the Nordics and Poland.

== Social responsibility ==
In 2023, Fortum became the first business head-quartered in Finland to secure Fair Tax Mark certification.

== See also ==
- Energy in Finland
