= Odd Øygarden =

Norwegian businessman

Odd Øygarden is a Norwegian businessman.

He was the CEO of Oslo Energi Produksjon since the 1990s; the company later changed name to E-CO Vannkraft. Øygarden is also vice president of the parent company E-CO Energi. In December 2008, he became acting CEO of E-CO Energi after Hans Erik Horn was forced to resign. In 2009, Tore Olaf Rimmereid took over as CEO, and Øygarden reverted to being vice president of E-CO Energi and CEO of E-CO Vannkraft.

Øygarden has also been a board member of Hafslund.
