= Tore Olaf Rimmereid =

Norwegian businessperson (born 1962)

Tore Olaf Rimmereid (born 1962) is a Norwegian businessperson.

He has the siv.øk. degree from the Norwegian School of Economics and Business Administration. From 1988 to 1990 he was an adviser for the Conservative Party parliamentary group. In 1990 he was a private adviser for trade and shipping affairs in the Ministry of Foreign Affairs. He lost his job when Syse's Cabinet fell later in 1990. He also worked for Sparebank 1 and Kreditkassen. In 2002 he was hired as CFO of the Norwegian Broadcasting Corporation. In 2009 he was hired as CEO of E-CO Energi. He succeeded acting CEO Odd Øygarden.

He has been a board member of Hafslund. In E-CO Energi he was a board member for ten years, from 2006 to 2009 as chairman. He is since 2008 a board member of DnB NOR, and is also chairman of E-CO Vannkraft. He has also been chairman of Medinnova and RiksTV.
