= Fredrikstad Energi =

Norwegian power company

Fredrikstad Energi AS
- Company type: Private
- Industry: Power
- Founded: 22 December 1994
- Founder: City of Fredrikstad
- Headquarters: Fredrikstad, Norway
- Area served: Fredrikstad
- Key people: Eilert Henriksen (CEO); Svein Johnny Høiden (Chairman)
- Revenue: ▲NOK 920 million (2006)
- Operating income: NOK 97 million (2006)
- Net income: NOK 8 million (2006)
- Number of employees: 129 (2019)
- Parent: City of Fredrikstad (51%); Fortum (49%)
- Website: www.feas.no

Fredrikstad Energi, branded as FEAS is a Norwegian power company that operates in Fredrikstad and Hvaler. The company is owned by the Municipality of Fredrikstad (51%) and Fortum (49%).

The company has bought a number of privatized power grid operators and power distribution companies in Norway, including Energi 1, Røyken Energiverk and Askøy Energi, as well as the now integrated Hvaler kommunale elverk. FEAS also is the largest owner of the Norwegian football premiership team Fredrikstad F.K. with 24% ownership.
