= Ellevio =

Swedish electricity distribution company

Ellevio AB

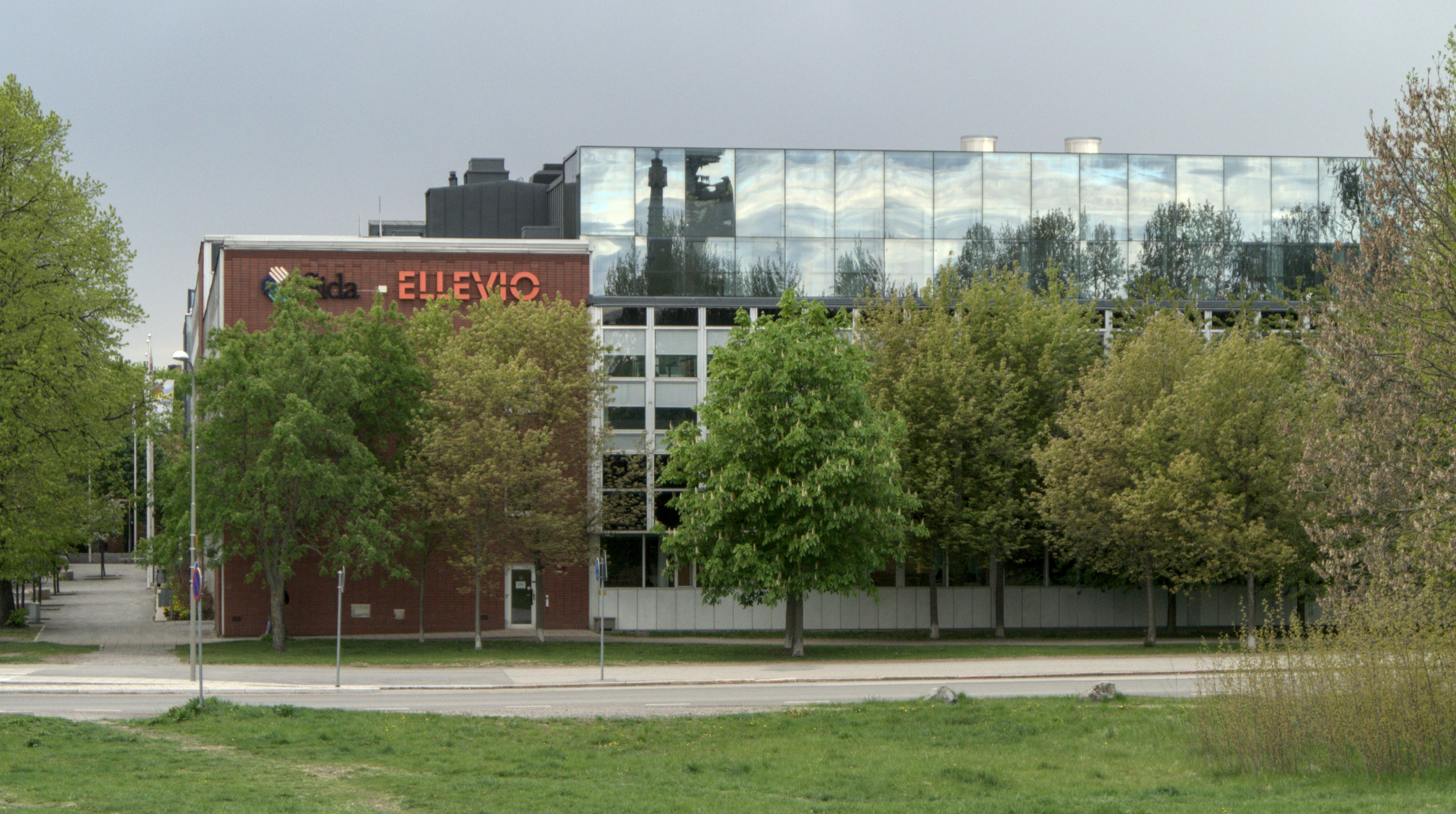
- Ellevio's head office in Stockholm, Sweden
- Company type: Public limited company
- Industry: Energy
- Predecessors: Stockholms elektricitetsverk Gullspångs Kraft
- Founded: 1892; 134 years ago (as Stockholms elektricitetsverk); 2015; 11 years ago (spun off from Fortum)
- Headquarters: Stockholm, Sweden
- Areas served: Bohuslän; Dalarna; Gävleborg; Halland; Närke; Norrbotten; Skaraborg; Stockholm; Värmland
- Key people: Johan Lindehag (CEO); Fredrik Persson (Chairman)
- Products: Electric power distribution Charging infrastructure
- Services: Energy storage Electricity supply
- Revenue: ▲8.231 billion kr (2023)
- Operating income: ▲2.694 billion kr (2023)
- Net income: ▲0.225 billion kr (2023)
- Total assets: ▲98.977 billion kr (2023)
- Total equity: ▲10.304 billion kr (2023)
- Owners: OMERS Infrastructure (50%); AP3 (20%); Folksam (17.5%); AMF (12.5%)
- Number of employees: 730 (2023)
- Website: www.ellevio.se/en/

Ellevio AB is a Swedish electric power distribution and energy company with headquarters in Stockholm and approximately 1,000,000 customers (2023). The company in its current shape was formed in 2015, when Fortum spun off its Swedish electric power distribution business, but it is also a successor to the municipal electric utility of Stockholm, founded in 1892. The number of direct employees is 730 (end of 2023). Through contractors, Ellevio also provides employment for a few thousand additional people. Ellevio emits corporate bonds and therefore publishes financial reports in the same manner as listed companies.

== History ==
In 1892, the city of Stockholm formed a municipal electric utility, Stockholms elektricitetsverk, which initially supplied power to a total of around 1,000 electric lights. Forty years later, the utility served 175,000 subscribers, who kept an estimated number of 2.5 million light fixtures connected to the grid. Until 1908, the electric utility was organized as a unit of the municipal gas utility.

In the second half of the 20th century, the utility went through several name changes, to Stockholms elverk (1960), Stockholms energiverk (1974), Stockholms Stads Energi (1985), and Stockholm Energi AB (1990).

Gullspångs Kraft, founded in 1906, was an early entrant into the hydroelectric power industry of Sweden. Following acquisitions of Hälsingekraft (1991), Uddeholm Kraft AB (1992), and AB Skandinaviska Elverk (1996), the company was, by the end of the 1990s, considered to be one of the leading electric power generation companies of Sweden. In 1997, it came into Finnish ownership, and in 1998, it became part of the newly formed Finnish company Fortum.

In 1998, Stockholm Energi and Gullspångs Kraft were merged into a single company, named Birka Energi, in a transaction between Stockholm municipality and Fortum that left the two parties with equal stakes in the new entity. In 2001, however, Stockholm municipality sold its stake to Fortum. From 2002, the company conducted its business under the Fortum brand, with power grid operations organized as a subsidiary called Fortum Distribution AB.

In 2015, Fortum sold its Swedish electric power distribution operations to Borealis Infrastructure (since 2017 named OMERS Infrastructure), Tredje AP-fonden (AP3, Third Swedish National Pension Fund), Folksam, and Första AP-fonden (AP1, First Swedish National Pension Fund). The spun-off company was named Ellevio.

In 2016, Ellevio bought the electric utility Nynäshamn Energi, with 16,000 subscribers in Nynäshamn and Ösmo, from Kraftringen AB.

In 2017, the publicly listed company Elverket Vallentuna, which operated the power grid of Vallentuna, was acquired. In the same year, there was a transaction with Svenska kraftnät around transmission grid assets in the Stockholm area, whereby Ellevio bought power lines, cables and switchgears and sold a planned major transmission cable.

In late 2019, a power grid with 500 subscribers in the Hamra area of Gävleborg County was acquired from the joint property association Hamra besparingsskog, and in 2021, the publicly listed company AB Edsbyns Elverk, with 4,000 subscribers in the same county, was bought by Ellevio's holding company, and its electricity network operations were integrated into Ellevio in 2022.

In December 2022, AP1 sold its stake in Ellevio to the pension management company AMF.

In September 2023, the Ellevio group bought the company Markbygden Net AB, which connects the Markbygden wind farm, situated near Piteå and described by the municipality as the largest land-based wind farm of Europe, to the Swedish transmission network.

== Operations ==
=== Electrical grids ===
Ellevio owns and operates local as well as regional electricity networks. In 2023, the company had 83,600 kilometers of power lines and cables, through which it distributed 24.2 TWh of electricity.

Since provision of power grids is considered a natural monopoly, the market is regulated by the Swedish Energy Markets Inspectorate (Energimarknadsinspektionen). The regulated operations of Ellevio serve approximately 1,000,000 customers (2023) in the regions of Dalarna, Värmland, the West coast (encompassing Halland and Bohuslän), Skaraborg-Närke, Gävleborgs län and Stockholm (encompassing Stockholm municipality, Ekerö, Lidingö, Täby, Nynäshamn and Vallentuna) There are also five customers whose wind turbines in Norrbotten are connected to the electrical grid by Ellevio.

Ellevio, E.ON, and Vattenfall together dominate the Swedish market for electrical grids. In 2016, it was estimated that, out of a total of approximately 170 power grid companies, these three connected more than half of the power subscribers in Sweden. In the same year, there were around 110 companies with fewer than 15,000 customers each.

Following the cyclone Gudrun in 2005, Swedish power distribution companies have invested heavily in protecting power transmission infrastructure from bad weather, through undergrounding and other measures. The work has been going on gradually. Since 2020, the length of power lines that Ellvio has converted to underground cables each year has varied between 794 and 1,359 kilometers. By the end of 2023, 85 percent, or 62,875 kilometers, of its local grid consisted of underground cables. Ellevio's regional distribution network is generally protected by means of wide power line corridors that are kept free from tall vegetation.

In 2021, Ellevio began a complete rebuild of the large switchgear located in the Hjorthagen district of Stockholm. Unlike the current outdoor facility, the new switchgear will be housed inside a building. The new facility will occupy less land and have an increased maximum capacity. The first stage of the project entered service in 2023. In the same year, a 12-kilometer cable connection underground and underwater across lake Mälaren, between the districts of Beckomberga and Bredäng in Stockholm, began operating, and demolition of the power line that it replaced began.

As of 2024, Ellevio is in the process of rebuilding its regional grid in eastern Hälsingland, to coincide with a major project by Svenska Kraftnät to increase the national north–south transmission capacity.

Two other notable grid investments are the connection of a battery factory being built by Volvo in Mariestad and the expansion of a transmission substation in Tovåsen between Ljusdal and Ånge. The Mariestad factory is expected to become Ellevio's largest electricity customer in a single location, and the projected power demand of 400 MW in 2030 equals the amount that, as of 2024, is used by the entire Skaraborg region. The Tovåsen substation received a 750 MW transformer in 2022, and installation of a second one with the same capacity is planned for 2028. The total capacity will then exceed the power output of the largest Swedish nuclear power plant. The substation connects, among other customers, wind farms, and it is expected to connect a planned hydrogen factory.

=== Charging infrastructure ===
Since 2019, Ellevio collaborates with the municipality of Stockholm on charging station infrastructure for electric cars. As a result, preparations for charging stations are performed proactively while other grid maintenance work takes place, and operators can get connections right up to individual charge points. This increases the overall cost-effectiveness of installing the stations. One example of the results of the collaboration is the inauguration, in 2024, of public charge points for 300 kW fast charging.

Ellevio is also a member of the organization Elektrifieringspakten i Stockholm (the Stockholm electrification pact), which it founded in 2021, along with the municipality of Stockholm, Scania AB and Volkswagen. The purpose is to make it easier for inhabitants of the Stockholm area to acquire and use electric cars, and in May 2022, around 40 companies and other organizations were members. The pact aims for the electrification of the city and the exclusive use of fossil-free transport by 2030.

=== Energy solutions ===
Since the spring of 2022, Ellevio has a business area called Energy Solutions. It operates as a separate corporate entity within the group and deals with investments and services to businesses relating to energy storage and electrical power supply. The first project announced by the business area was a battery storage system in Grums, which was expected to become the largest such system in Sweden and entered service in 2023. In 2024, a large storage system was installed in Kungsbacka, and several other battery projects are in progress. The main purpose of these storage systems is to supply stabilizing support services to the Swedish electricity grid.

== Criticism ==
Reporting in 2015 by Sveriges Television stated that a third of the revenue of Ellevio was profit, and the company was asked why it raised its prices by 9 percent, while already having a large profit margin. The following year, prices where increased by a similar ratio. The organization Villaägarnas riksförbund (the Swedish Homeowners Association) criticized the increases and described the situation as one where monopolists take advantage of an insufficiently regulated market, a phenomenon also known as rent-seeking.

In general, many Swedish power distribution companies raised their prices in the same years. The increases made by Ellevio were larger than those implemented by the two other major grid operators, but one smaller company that increased its transmission fees by more than 31 percent also got media attention. Ellevio responded to the criticism by asserting that the need for future investments was large and emphasizing that the price increases did not exceed the levels allowed by the current regulations. At the same time, the company stated that further increases were to be expected. An advisor to the company argued that the profit margin should be viewed with capital costs as a backdrop.

In December 2017, Ellevio began moving towards equalization of prices between different geographical areas, which meant lower prices in sparsely populated regions and higher prices in Greater Stockholm. In a survey done by Dagens Nyheter of the finances of the three major power distribution companies from 2014 to 2019, Ellevio was shown to have the lowest profit margin in every year except 2014. A report from the property owner and tenant interest group Nils Holgerssongruppen showed that between 2014 and 2019, the accumulated relative price increase implemented by Ellevio was substantially lower than those of the other two major grid operators and also somewhat lower than the average accumulated increase by all the smaller operators. In 2020, Ellevio, like several other large Swedish power distribution companies, lowered their fees for a majority of private customers. When evaluating prices for 2023, Nils Holgerssongruppen noted that Ellevio had decreased its price level by 17 percent, to a level below the average, while other operators had, on average, increased their fees by 8.4 percent.

== Owners ==
Ellevio is owned by the pension funds OMERS Infrastructure (50%), AP3 (20%), Folksam (17.5%) and AMF (12.5%). OMERS Infrastructure manages pension capital for local government employees in the Canadian province of Ontario. AP3 is a pension fund operated by the Swedish government, Folksam is a mutual insurance company, and AMF is a pension fund jointly owned by the Confederation of Swedish Enterprise and the Swedish Trade Union Confederation.

== Head office ==
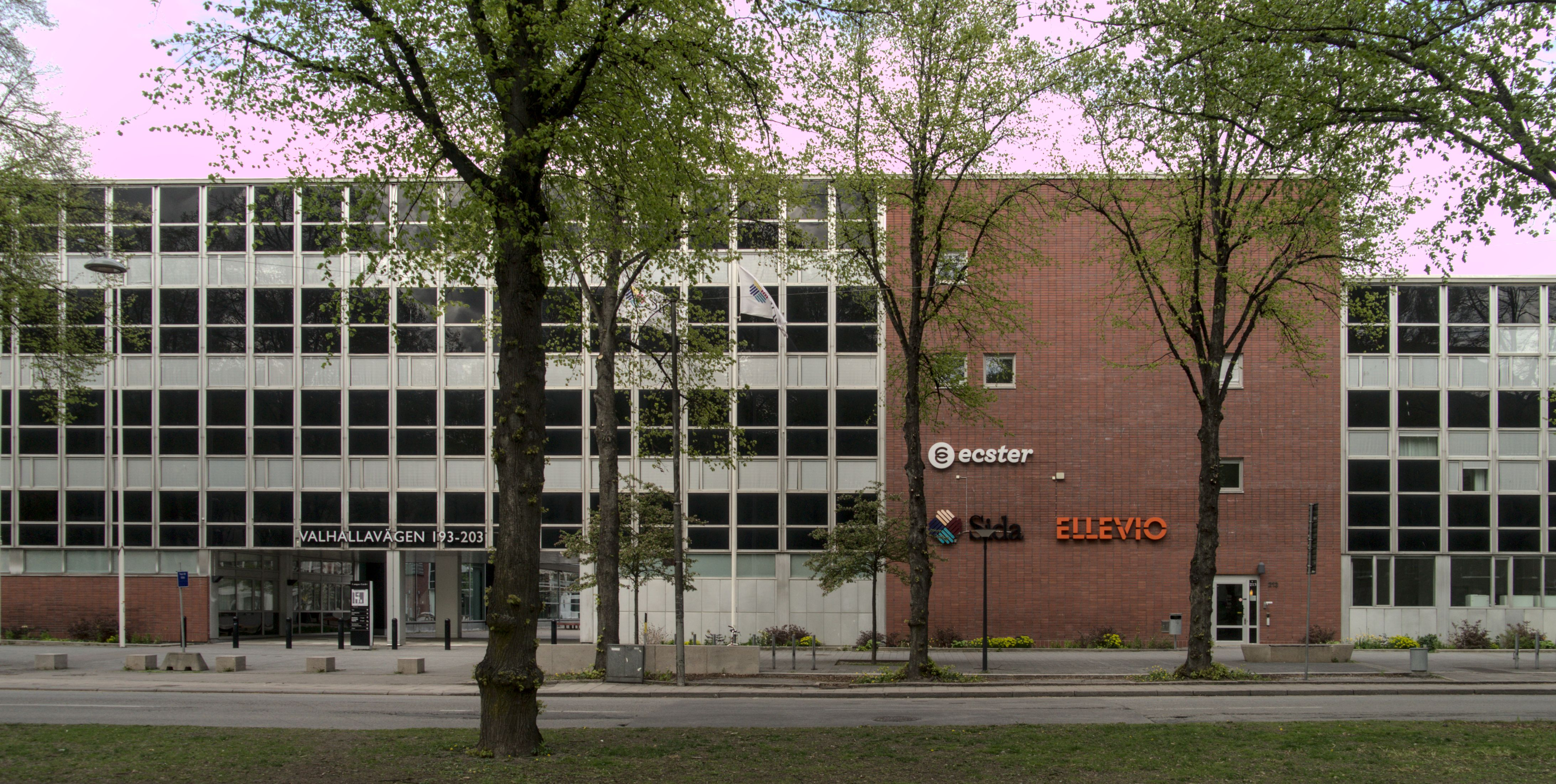

The head office of Ellevio is located at Valhallavägen 203, Stockholm, in an office complex originally designed and built for the art, crafts and design school Konstfackskolan. The building is classified as being of particular value with regard to cultural history.

== Collaborations ==
In 2020, Ellevio and the electricity supply company GodEl founded the yearly innovation contest Startup 4 Climate. The contestants are Swedish companies that develop products or services intended to counteract climate change. As of 2024, the participants compete for a prize of 2 million Swedish krona.
