= E-CO Energi =

Norwegian power company

E-CO Energi AS
- Company type: Municipal owned
- Industry: Power
- Founded: 1892
- Headquarters: Oslo, Norway
- Area served: Norway
- Key people: Tore Olaf Rimmereid (CEO); Erik Nygaard (Chairman)
- Products: Electricity
- Revenue: ▲NOK 4,076 million (2010)
- Operating income: NOK 3,103 million (2010)
- Net income: NOK 1200 million (2010)
- Number of employees: 172 (2011)
- Parent: City of Oslo
- Website: www.e-co.no

E-CO Energi is a Norwegian power company and after Statkraft the second largest producer of Hydroelectricity in Norway.

The Majority of the company is owned by Hafslund AS, which itself is owned by the Oslo municipality.

== Structure ==
E-CO is wholly owned by the City of Oslo. Operations are divided into E-CO Vannkraft, E-CO Norne and Oslo Lysverker. E-CO also holds partial ownership of Oppland Energi, Opplandskraft, Øvre Otta, Vinstra Kraftselskap, Embretsfosskraftverkene and Norsk Grønnkraft. Total annual production is 9.7 TWh.

E-CO has its own production plants in Aurland, Hallingdal and Nedre Glomma. Partially owned plants are located throughout Southern Norway, with main focus on Innlandet and Buskerud. All in all E-CO owns, operates wholly and partially, more than 70 hydroelectric power plants, including the third largest in Norway, Aurland 1. E-CO is also the largest owner of the Øvre Otta construction, that is one of the most extensive in Norway in later years.

== History ==
Christiania Elektricitetesværk was founded in 1892, with Hammeren power plant in Maridalen in Oslo opening a few years later. The hydro power production increased considerably from the 1920s until 1989 under the name Oslo Lysverker, including the construction of the power plants in Hallingdal and Vinstra in Gudbrandsdalen. In 1991, Oslo Lysverker changed its name to Oslo Energi, and was then split into two divisions: Oslo Energi Nett (later Viken Nett, now part of Hafslund) that operated the power grid and Oslo Energi Holding. The later sold the end-user sale company and thus the brand name in 2001. Thereafter the company changed its name to E-CO Energi. This resulted in a focus on hydro power production, followed by purchases in the Buskerud Kraftproduksjon and Oppland Energi power companies. E-CO has since continued to develop hydro power production in both new and existing regulations.

== See also ==
- Scotland-Norway interconnector
