= Rebekah Yeoh =

Malaysian businesswoman

- Born: Yeoh Pei Wenn; Kuala Lumpur, Malaysia
- Education: Garden International School
- Alma mater: London School of Economics
- Occupations: businesswoman, philanthropist
- Parent(s): Francis Yeoh; Rosaline Yeoh
- Relatives: Yeoh Tiong Lay; Ruth Yeoh; Rachel Yeoh; Michelle Yeoh

Rebekah Yeoh Pei Wenn is a Malaysian social entrepreneur, businesswoman and philanthropist. She is a Corporate Finance Director at YTL Corporation, Deputy Curator at Global Shapers Community Kuala Lampur, and the founder of Nimble Fingers Cambodia and Recyclothes.

== Biography ==
Yeoh is the daughter of businessman Tan Sri Dato' Francis Yeoh and Puan Sri Datin Paduka Rosaline Yeoh. She attended Garden International School, where she was awarded The International General Certificate of Secondary Education Brilliance Award in 2008. She graduated with a degree in Pure Economics from the London School of Economics. She is a younger sister of Ruth Yeoh and is Rachel Yeoh and Michelle Yeoh's first cousin.

Yeoh works as a corporate finance manager at her family's company YTL Corporation, which was founded by her paternal grandfather Tan Sri Dato' Seri Yeoh Tiong Lay.

Yeoh's philanthropic work focuses on underprivileged children in India and Cambodia, using economics to work against social injustices faced by poor communities. She is the founder of Nimble Fingers Cambodia, a children's empowerment program and charity which helps underprivileged children in Cambodia learn about finance, disposable income, and savings. In 2013 she joined the Global Shapers Community Kuala Lampur, a branch of the World Economic Forum, where she monitors four projects focusing on food, transportation, safety, and literacy. Yeoh was appointed as the regional ambassador for Dignity For Children Foundation in 2015. She has served as a core member of the UBS 20/20 Social Impact Group in South East Asia since 2016. In 2016 she co-founded Recyclothes with Ruth Yeoh, Melissa Yang, and Yi Ping Teo to promote sustainable fashion and re-market disowned clothes to raise money for school uniforms for poor children. Yeoh also promotes exercise as a way for communities to come together.
