= Michelle Yeoh (socialite) =

Malaysian heiress and model

- Born: Kuala Lumpur, Malaysia
- Occupations: fashion influencer, socialite, model
- Parent(s): Michael Yeoh; Tina Yeoh
- Relatives: Yeoh Tiong Lay; Francis Yeoh; Rebekah Yeoh; Rachel Yeoh (twin sister); Ruth Yeoh

Michelle Yeoh is a Malaysian heiress, socialite, model and fashion influencer. She and her twin sister were the first Malaysians to debut at Queen Charlotte's Ball. She rose to prominence walking for Dolce & Gabbana at Milan Fashion Week. She served on the advisory committee for the British Fashion Council.

== Early life and family ==
Michelle Yeoh is the daughter of Dato' Sri Michael Yeoh and Datin Sri Tina Yeoh. She is a niece of Tan Sri Dato' Francis Yeoh and the granddaughter of billionaire Tan Sri Dato' Seri Yeoh Tiong Lay, the founder of YTL Corporation. She is of Malaysian Chinese ancestry. She is a fraternal twin; her sister is Rachel Yeoh. She is a first cousin of Ruth Yeoh and Rebekah Yeoh.

Yeoh and her sister debuted at the Queen Charlotte's Ball at Kensington Palace in 2015, becoming the first twins and first Malaysians to do so.

== Career ==
In 2017, she and her sister walked the runway for Dolce & Gabbana's Fall 2017 fashion show in Milan Fashion Week. In August 2017, she was featured on the cover of Vogue Japan along with the other models from the Dolce & Gabbana fashion show. She and her sister were featured in the March 2017 fashion issue of Hong Kong Tatler and on the cover of Malaysia Tatler. In 2018, she walked the runway for Dolce & Gabbana's Alta Moda show.

Yeoh serves alongside her sister on the advisory committee for the British Fashion Council.
