= Ruth Yeoh =

Malaysian businesswoman, philanthropist and environmentalist

- Born: Yeoh Pei Cheen; Kuala Lumpur, Malaysia
- Education: University of Nottingham; City, University of London
- Occupations: businesswoman, environmentalist, philanthropist
- Spouse: Kenneth Khaw
- Parent(s): Francis Yeoh; Rosaline Yeoh
- Relatives: Yeoh Tiong Lay; Rebekah Yeoh; Rachel Yeoh; Michelle Yeoh

Ruth Yeoh Pei Cheen is a Malaysian businesswoman, philanthropist and environmentalist. She is currently the Executive Director at YTL Singapore and Director of YTL Corporation's carbon credit and clean development mechanism consultancy. She is the co-author of Cut Carbon, Grow Profits: Business Strategies for Managing Climate Change and Sustainability.

== Early life and family ==
Ruth Yeoh is the oldest child of Malaysian billionaire Tan Sri Dato' Francis Yeoh and Puan Sri Datin Paduka Rosaline Yeoh. Her paternal grandfather was Tan Sri Dato' Seri Yeoh Tiong Lay, the founder of YTL Corporation. She is the older sister of Rebekah Yeoh and a first cousin of Rachel Yeoh and Michelle Yeoh.

She graduated with a degree in Architectural Studies from the University of Nottingham and has a degree in Management from the Cass Business School at City, University of London.

== Career ==
Yeoh began working for her family's company, YTL Corporation, in 2005. She serves as the executive director of the Singapore branch and leads the corporation's sustainability division. She started YTL's Climate Change Week, a flagship educational program designed to raise awareness about climate change and its effects both in Malaysia and globally. In 2008 she was appointed as a member of the Board of Rare Conservation. She was awarded a Silver Award in CSR Leadership at the Global CSR Summit Awards in 2011. In 2012 she was awarded the Regional Singapore Environmental Achievement Award by the Singapore Environmental Council. In 2014 she was awarded a GreenTech Award as one of Malaysia's Top 30 Green Catalysts. In 2013 she served as a committee member for the Singapore Environmental Achievement Awards and was selected as a World Cities Summit Young Leader for the 2014 World Cities Summit. In 2015 she co-founded Recyclothes, a sustainable fashion project and charity, with her sister Rebekah Yeoh. Since 2015 Yeoh has served on the Board of Trustees for Kew Foundation to support the Royal Botanic Gardens. She is also a member of the Board of Advisers for the Malaysian Association in Singapore, a board member for the Gardens by the Bay and a board member of United Women Singapore. She serves as a Global Goodwill Ambassador for the Dignity for Children Foundation. She is a member of the Business Council for Sustainability and Responsibility Malaysia and an investment member of the Asian Renewable Energy and Environment Fund and the Renewable Energy and Environment Fund. She is also a board member at Reef Check Malaysia and a fellow at Asia Society's Asia 21 Young Leaders Initiative.

She has written for the Wall Street Journal and Financial Times and in 2007 co-edited and wrote a book on climate change called Cut Carbon, Grow Profits: Business Strategies for Managing Climate Change and Sustainability.

In 2015 she was listed as one of twelve to watch in Forbes' list of Asia's Power Businesswomen and was listed as one of their "Heroes of Philanthropy" for her work in conservation and sustainable development. She was awarded the Alumni Laureate Award by the University of Nottingham in 2017.

== Personal life ==
Yeoh is a practising Christian, and has expressed that her faith is part of inspiration for sustainable and environmental work. She is married to Kenneth Khaw.
