= Nilai Memorial Park =

Cemetery in Kuala Lumpur, Malaysia

Xiao En Memorial Park
- Interactive map of Xiao En Memorial Park

Details
- Location: Nilai, Negeri Sembilan
- Country: Malaysia
- Coordinates: 2°51′15″N 101°47′31″E
- Type: Private Cemetery
- Owned by: Xiao En Group
- Website: Official website
- Find a Grave: Xiao En Memorial Park

Xiao En Memorial Park, previously known as Nilai Memorial Park, is a public memorial park in Nilai, Negeri Sembilan, Malaysia. It is situated along the "Nilai Layby" of the North–South Expressway Southern Route and became the first closed tolled expressway public memorial park in Malaysia.

== Urn theft ==
In March 2026, Polis Diraja Malaysia (PDRM) confirmed that 30 urns were stolen from a columbarium in the memorial park. A similar theft was reported at Perpetual Memorial Park in Kulai, Johor, and Nirvana Memorial Park in Semenyih, Selangor. The theft was suspected to be related to a cross-border criminal group holding the ashes of deceased for ransom. PDRM have since recovered four urns for Xiao En.

== Notable burials ==
- Lee Hui Pin (1972–2014), Malaysia Airlines stewardess and victim of Malaysia Airlines MH17
- Tun Dr. Ling Liong Sik (1943–2026), politician, acting Prime Minister of Malaysia, Minister of Transport, president of the Malaysian Chinese Association, chancellor of Universiti Tunku Abdul Rahman
- Low Boon Chian, director and founder of Petaling Garden Bhd., chairman and founder of Low Boon Chian & Sons
- Canny Ong Lay Kian (1974–2003), rape-murder victim of Ahmad Najib Aris
- Captain Eugene Tan Soo Peng (1969–2014), Malaysia Airlines pilot and victim of Malaysia Airlines MH17
- Puan Sri Rosaline Yeoh (1952–2006), model, Hong Kong television personality and wife of YTL Corporation chairman Tan Sri Francis Yeoh
- Yeoh Tiong Lay (1929–2017), chairman and founder of YTL Corporation
