= Rachel Yeoh =

Malaysian socialite

- Born: Kuala Lumpur, Malaysia
- Occupations: fashion influencer, socialite, model
- Relatives: Yeoh Tiong Lay (grandfather); Francis Yeoh (uncle); Rebekah Yeoh (cousin); Michelle Yeoh (twin sister); Ruth Yeoh (cousin)

Rachel Yeoh is a Malaysian socialite, heiress, model, and fashion influencer.

== Early life and family ==
Rachel Yeoh was born in Kuala Lumpur and has a fraternal twin sister, Michelle. A member of a wealthy Malaysian Chinese family, she is the daughter of Dato' Sri Michael Yeoh and Datin Sri Tina Yeoh. Her paternal grandfather is businessman Tan Sri Dato' Seri Yeoh Tiong Lay, the founder of YTL Corporation. She is a niece of Tan Sri Dato' Francis Yeoh and a first cousin of Ruth Yeoh and Rebekah Yeoh.

In 2015, she and her sister were the first Malaysians, and the first twins, to debut at Queen Charlotte's Ball at Kensington Palace.

== Career ==
Yeoh serves alongside her sister on the advisory committee for the British Fashion Council, which determines the allocation of funds and grants given to designers.

In 2017, she walked as a model for Dolce & Gabbana's Fall 2017 fashion show in Milan Fashion Week. In August 2017 she was featured on the cover of Vogue Japan. She and her sister were featured in the March 2017 fashion issue of Hong Kong Tatler and on the cover of Malaysia Tatler. In 2018, she walked the runway for Dolce & Gabbana's Alta Moda show in Lake Como.

== Education ==
Yeoh graduated in June 2019 with a Politics, Philosophy and Law LLB degree at the Dickson Poon School of Law at King’s College London.
