= Sri Garden =

Taylor's International School Kuala Lumpur
- Kuala Lumpur, Wilayah Persekutuan, Malaysia

Information
- Type: International School co-educational kindergarten, primary school, secondary school and international school
- Motto: Heritage of Excellence
- Established: 1991
- Principal: Peter Wells
- Grades: Kindergarten; Year 1 - Year 6 (Primary); Year 7 - Year 11 (Secondary); Sixth Form
- Yearbook: Taylor's International School

Taylor's International School Kuala Lumpur (formerly known as Sekolah Sri Garden) was founded in 1991. It was first established as a school for the country's Badminton Association Malaysia players, before transforming into one of several private schools that cropped up in the Malaysian capital. In 2011, it introduced the international curriculum and would later change its name to Taylor’s International School.

TIS also expanded with a second campus located in Puchong. Both schools are affiliated with the Australian International School Malaysia (Australian Curriculum), Garden International School (English Curriculum), Nexus International School (English Curriculum), Taylor's University and Taylor's College Sri Hartamas through the Taylor's Education Group.

== Curriculum ==
The school offers a Mandarin programme developed by the Beijing Language and Cultural University to complement the Mandarin subject under the national curriculum. Students under this programme may sit for the Hanyu Shuiping Kaoshi (HSK, or Chinese Proficiency Test) examinations that are recognised by universities in China.

Sri Garden International was launched starting 2011 based on the National Curriculum for England to IGCSE.

Together with sister schools such as Morioka Chuo High School in Japan, the school carries out cultural exchange programmes each year. In these, students are given the opportunity to host Japanese students, or to visit Japan to represent the school.

Part of the Sri Garden Alumni includes Malaysia's number 1 in badminton and triple Olympics silver medalist Dato Lee Chong Wei.
