= Ranhill SAJ =

Water supply company in Johor, Malaysia

Ranhill SAJ Sendirian Berhad
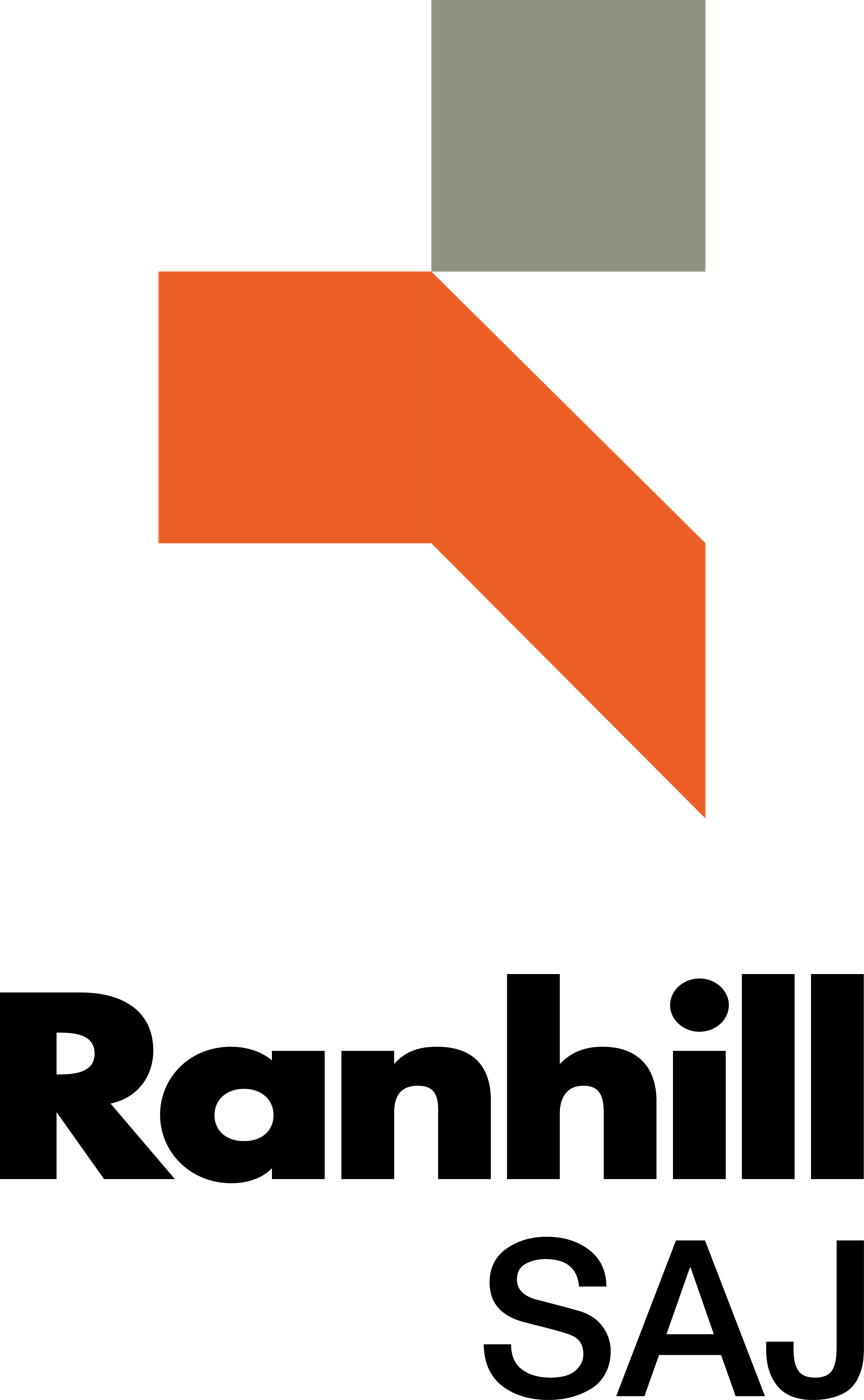

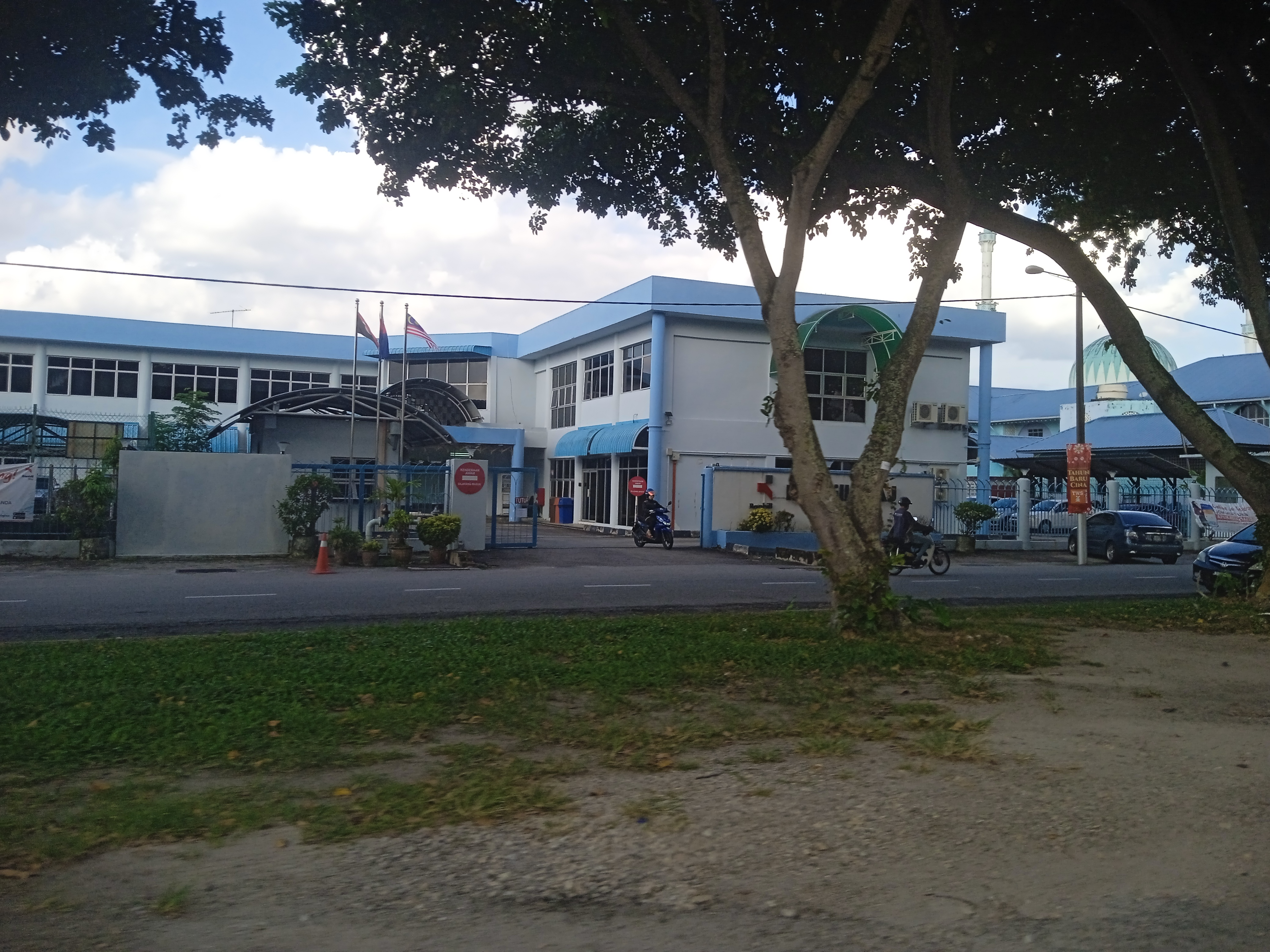
- Formerly: SAJ Ranhill Sdn Bhd
- Company type: Private Limited Company
- Industry: Water utility company
- Founded: 1994
- Headquarters: Jalan Garuda, Larkin, 80350 Johor Bahru, Johor, Malaysia
- Key people: Hamdan Mohamad, President
- Parent: Ranhill Utilities Berhad
- Website: ranhillsaj.com.my

Ranhill SAJ Sdn Bhd is a utility company responsible for water supply services in Johor. Ranhill SAJ is a subsidiary of the Ranhill Utilities Berhad.

== History ==
Formerly known as Jabatan Bekalan Air Johor (JBAJ) a water supply department owned by the Johor state government. SAJ was established on 1994 under the Malaysian Companies Act 1965.
