= Yeoh Soo Keng =

Malaysian business executive

Soo Keng Yeoh is a Malaysian business executive, and civil engineer. In 2017, her net worth was estimated to be RM 323.99 million.

== Life ==
She is the daughter of Yeoh Tiong Lay and Tan Kai Yong. She graduated from Leeds University. She was a Project director at Yeoh Tiong Lay Plaza, the Pahang Cement plant, and Slag Cement plant.

She was an Executive Director of YTL Cement. She is a Director of Pahang Cement Marketing, and Perak-Hanjoong Simen. She is Executive Director at YTL Power Intl.
