= YTL Power =

Malaysian electric power company

YTL Power International Berhad
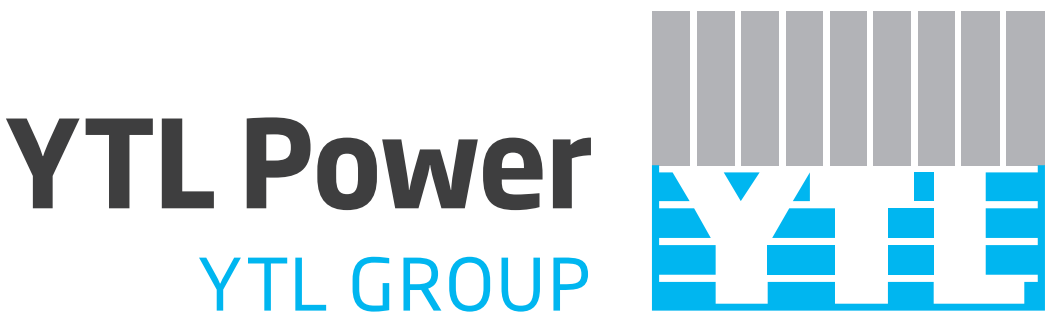
- Type: Public
- Traded as: MYX: 6742
- ISIN: MYL6742OO000
- Industry: Conglomerate
- Headquarters: Kuala Lumpur, Malaysia
- Area served: 6 countries and territories: Malaysia; Singapore; Indonesia; United Kingdom; Australia; Jordan
- Key people: Yeoh Sock Ping (Chairman); Yeoh Seok Kian (MD)
- Revenue: ▲RM 22.3 billion (2024)
- Net income: ▲RM 3.4 billion (2024)
- Total assets: ▲RM 66.8 billion (2024)
- Number of employees: 5,178 (2024)
- Parent: YTL Corporation
- Website: www.ytlpowerinternational.com

YTL Power International Berhad (YTL Power) is a subsidiary of YTL Corporation Berhad (YTL Corp), one of the largest companies listed on Bursa Malaysia. As of June 2024, the total combined group market capitalisation is RM 103.65 billion. Furthermore, YTL Corp and YTL Power were listed in the Fortune Southeast Asia 500 for the year 2024, ranking 47th and 78th, respectively. The ranking of the 500 Largest Companies in Southeast Asia is based on the revenue for the fiscal year 2023. As of November 2023, YTL Corp and YTL Power are included as constituents of the FTSE Bursa Malaysia KLCI (FBM KLCI) index.

YTL Power, the utilities arm of YTL Corp, is an international multi-utility owner and operator active across key segments of the utilities industry. The company has operations, investments and projects under development in Malaysia, Singapore, the United Kingdom, Indonesia, the Hashemite Kingdom of Jordan, and the Netherlands. YTL Power was listed on Bursa Malaysia (the Kuala Lumpur Stock Exchange) since 23 May 1997, on the Main Market of the exchange under the Gas, Water & Multi-Utilities sub-sector of the Utilities sector.

The utilities segment continues to be the Group’s largest operating segment, contributing 69% of revenue for the financial year ended 30 June 2024. As of June 2024, YTL Power has a market capitalisation of RM 45.05 billion and is ranked #8 by market capitalisation on the KLSE.

== Key Subsidiaries ==
YTL Power Generation Sdn Bhd - Malaysia

In 1992, YTL Power started as the first Independent Power Producer (IPP) in Malaysia by securing a 21-year Power Purchase Agreement (PPA) from the government for the development of a 1,212MW combined cycle power plant at Paka, Terengganu, and Pasir Gudang, Johor. The development of the combined cycle power plant was financed through a ringgit denominated currency, facilitated by the first 15-year long term bond issued by the Employees Provident Fund (EPF). This financing successfully mitigated the influence of the Asian Financial Crisis at that time.

The construction and the commissioning of the first open-cycle plant was completed in 10 months, while the gas-fired combined cycle plant was completed in 22 months. Subsequently in September 2017, the Paka power plant was awarded a supplementary PPA for a further period of 3 years and 10 months.

ElectraNet Pty Ltd – Australia

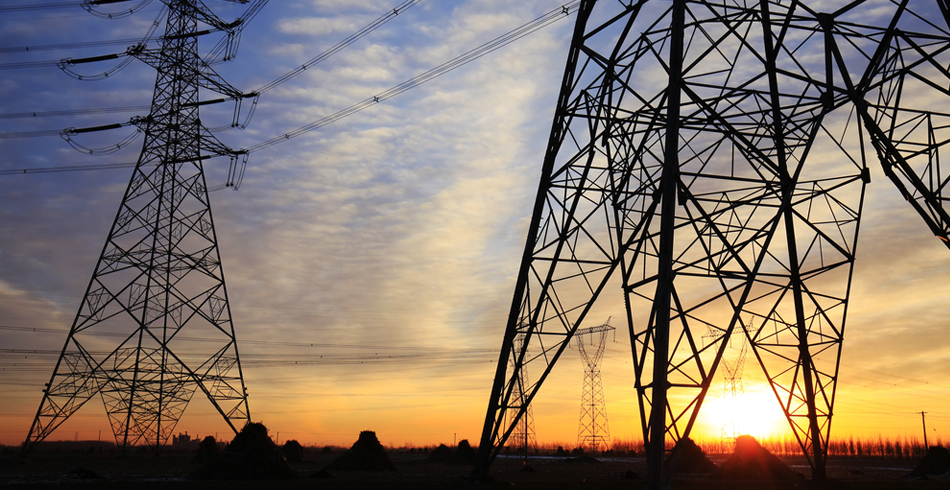
ElectraNet high voltage transmission lines

In 2000, YTL Power acquired a 33.5% equity interest in ElectraNet Pty Ltd (ElectraNet) for AUD 58.5 million (approximately RM 122.9 million). ElectraNet is an electricity transmission company in South Australia serving regional transmission under a 200-year lease. ElectraNet transmits power over long distances from regional generators and interstate sources to metropolitan and regional areas including large, direct-connect industrial customers.

In 2022, YTL Power divested its stake in ElectraNet to Australian Utilities Pty Ltd for a consideration of approximately RM 3.07 billion, generating RM 2.2 billion in gains upon completion of the transaction.

Wessex Water Limited – United Kingdom

In 2002, YTL Power acquired 100% of Wessex Water Limited (Wessex Water) from Enron. Wessex Water is a regional water and sewerage service company that serves 2.9 million customers across a geographic area of approximately 10,000 square kilometres in the southwest of England, including Dorset, Somerset, Bristol, most of Wiltshire and parts of Gloucestershire and Hampshire.

Wessex Water is regulated by the Water Services Regulation Authority (known as Ofwat), the economic regulator for the UK water industry, and holds a licence from the UK government under an instrument of appointment to supply clean water and treat and dispose of wastewater from its operating region. When it was first acquired by YTL Power in 2002, the regulatory capital value of Wessex Water is £1.3 billion. As of 30 June 2023, the regulatory capital value was at £4.1 billion (approximately RM 24.4 billion).

YTL PowerSeraya Pte Limited - Singapore

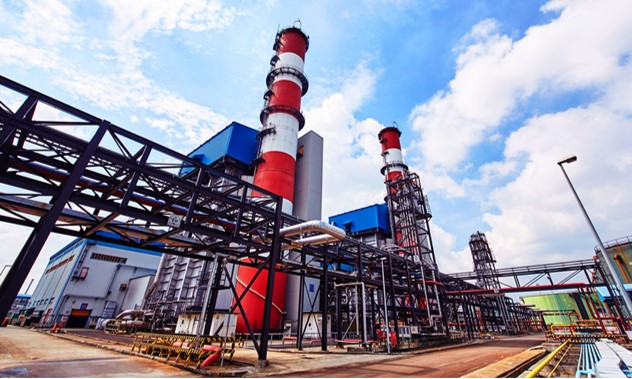

On 6 March 2009, YTL Power acquired 100% equity interest in YTL PowerSeraya Pte Ltd (YTL PowerSeraya) from Temasek Holdings. YTL PowerSeraya is situated on Jurong Island – Singapore’s oil, gas and petrochemicals hub which is in close proximity to the world’s major shipping and oil routes, and has extensive fuel storage capacity.

YTL PowerSeraya’s power generation business has a licensed generating capacity of 3,100MW, consisting of combined cycle plants, co-generation combined cycle and steam turbine plants.

In 2011, PowerSeraya begun exporting electricity to Malaysia’s national power producer, Tenaga Nasional Berhad, marking the first commercial deal for cross-border sale of electricity between Singapore and Malaysia.

In 2018, YTL PowerSeraya re-established its retail brand in Singapore as Geneco (previously known as Seraya Energy). Besides Geneco's commercial and industrial customers, the company now also caters to households as well as small and medium enterprises.

In 2022, YTL PowerSeraya acquired Tuaspring Pte Ltd, a 396 MW combined cycle gas turbine power plant in Singapore. The original purchase consideration of SGD 331.45 million, which was to be settled via a combination of cash, shares and shareholder loans in the holding company of YTL PowerSeraya was subsequently restructured to a purely cash deal of SGD 270.0 million. The transaction was completed in June 2022. The plants operated under YTL PowerSeraya contribute more than 30% of Singapore’s total electricity needs.

In 2023, YTL PowerSeraya collaborated with TNB Power Generation Sdn Bhd for the export and import of 100MW of electricity to Singapore via a newly upgraded interconnector. In January 2024, YTL PowerSeraya won the request for proposal (RFP) for the development of a 600MW hydrogen-ready CCGT under Singapore’s Energy Market Authority’s new centralised process and it is expected to be completed by 31 December 2027.

YTL Communications Sdn Bhd - Malaysia

In Malaysia, YTL Power owns a 60% stake in YTL Communications Sdn Bhd (YTL Comms), which operates a 4G LTE network using the 2.3 GHz and 2.6 GHz spectrum awarded by the Malaysian Communications and Multimedia Commission (MCMC). YTL Comms’ network provides high-speed mobile services under the Yes brand since 2010.

Under the 1BestariNet programme, Yes worked with the Malaysian Ministry of Education to provide 10,000 primary and secondary national schools across the country with high-speed 4G internet connection and to use the cloud-based Frog VLE (Virtual Learning Environment) platform. The 1BestariNet was an initiative by the Ministry of Education to replace and improve the SchoolNet service which expired at the end of 2010.

YTL Data Center Holdings Pte Ltd – Malaysia/Singapore

YTL Data Center Holdings Pte. Ltd. (YTLDC) is an investment holding company that owns and operates data centers.

Dodid Pte. Ltd.

In December 2021, YTLDC completed the acquisition of Dodid Pte. Ltd. (Dodid), owner of a 12.5MW, Tier-3 data center in Singapore. Dodid is a data center located in Tagore Lane, Singapore which houses nine data hall suites equipped with dual meet-me rooms and MDF rooms within a 4-storey building. This marked YTLDC’s first foray into the data center industry outside Malaysia, and is the initial step towards establishing a regional data center platform in Southeast Asia.

YTL Green Data Center Park

In 2022, YTL Power embarked on the development of the YTL Green Data Center Park in Kulai, Johor with a total investment value of RM15 billion, through its subsidiary YTLDC. This will be the first data center campus in Malaysia to be co-powered by on-site renewable solar energy. The data center is located 30 km from Singapore in the Iskandar region of Johor, and will be powered by a 500MW solar farm, offering diversity in power and connectivity on a large industrial site, of which 275 acres will be dedicated to data center development.

YTLDC and Sea Limited broke ground with a RM1.5 billion investment for the development of the Sea Data Center in August 2022, marking the first phase of the YTL Green Data Center Park. The facility will feature 24 data hall suites, M&E rooms, office space, storage, and parking facilities. The first phase of the co-development will enter service in 2024.

Collaboration with NVIDIA in YTL AI Cloud

In December 2023, NVIDIA Corporation (NVIDIA) and YTL Power announced their partnership on artificial intelligence (AI) infrastructure, including supercomputers and cloud computing, with the project to be hosted at the YTL Green Data Center Park. YTL Power will collaborate with NVIDIA to build Malaysia's fastest supercomputers using NVDIA AI chips in a USD 4.3 billion (RM 20.6 billion) investment deal. Additionally, YTL Power will utilise NVIDIA’s AI cloud computing platform to build a large language model in Malay. NVIDIA’s CEO Jensen Huang mentioned that Malaysia is an important hub for Southeast Asia's computing infrastructure, which requires access to land, facilities and power, and YTL could play a significant role in that. In addition, Jensen Huang agreed to develop the AI ecosystem in Malaysia by supporting the construction of a center of excellence to facilitate AI learning and research.

In March 2024, YTL Power announced the formation of YTL AI Cloud. YTL is among the first companies to adopt NVIDIA GB200 NVL72, which is a multi-node, liquid-cooled, rack-scale system with fifth-generation NVLink. The supercomputer will be interconnected by NVIDIA Quantum InfiniBand networking platform. The platform acts as a single GPU with 1.4 exaflops of AI performance and 30TB of fast memory and is designed for the most compute-intensive workloads. The YTL AI Supercomputer will surpass more than 300 exaflops of AI compute, making it one of the fastest supercomputers in the world.

YTL Sentul Data Center

The YTL Sentul Data Center serves as an edge data center, and has up to 500 racks in capacity of data hall space (up to 5 MW) housing 4 data halls over a single-storey with the provision of office space, storage and parking facilities.

YTL Digital Capital Sdn. Bhd. - Malaysia

In April 2022, YTL Digital Capital, in consortium with Sea Limited, was one out of 29 applicants that won the digital banking licence from Bank Negara Malaysia. The collaboration forms Ryt Bank, Malaysia’s First AI-Powered Digital Bank, licensed by Bank Negara Malaysia (BNM) and protected by Perbadanan Insurans Deposit Malaysia (PIDM). As of August 2026, Ryt Bank has more than 1.5 million customers.

YTL Developments UK Limited – United Kingdom

YTL Developments UK Limited (YTL Developments), a wholly owned subsidiary of YTL Property UK, is headquartered in Bristol. The current project under development is Brabazon – a new "urban community" that will comprise new homes, employment space, new schools and a town-center. YTL Developments is currently delivering the first phase at Brabazon, known as The Hangar District, comprising 302 residential units apportioned to 127 landed and 175 apartment units. All open-market homes are sold in staggered releases, and to date, all have been sold off-plan with no voids accrued.

In March 2024, the South Gloucestershire Council granted permission for revised plans from YTL Developments to build 6,500 new homes, including the west of England's largest urban park. The park will feature a heritage trail, connecting the Brabazon Hangars with Aerospace Bristol Museum. A floating boardwalk around the lake, independent cafes, restaurants and outdoor sports facilities are also in the plans. Of the 6,500 properties, 2,000 will be student accommodation and more than 1,700 will be affordable.

YTL Arena Limited

YTL Arena Limited, a wholly owned subsidiary of YTL Property UK, is progressing well with the development of YTL Arena Bristol, situated at the Brabazon Hangars, Filton. The arena will feature an exhibition and convention hall with 6,000 sqm of floor area, height clearance of 21 metres and dining capacity for 4,000, together with entertainment, film, television and music rehearsals.

Ranhill Utilities Bhd

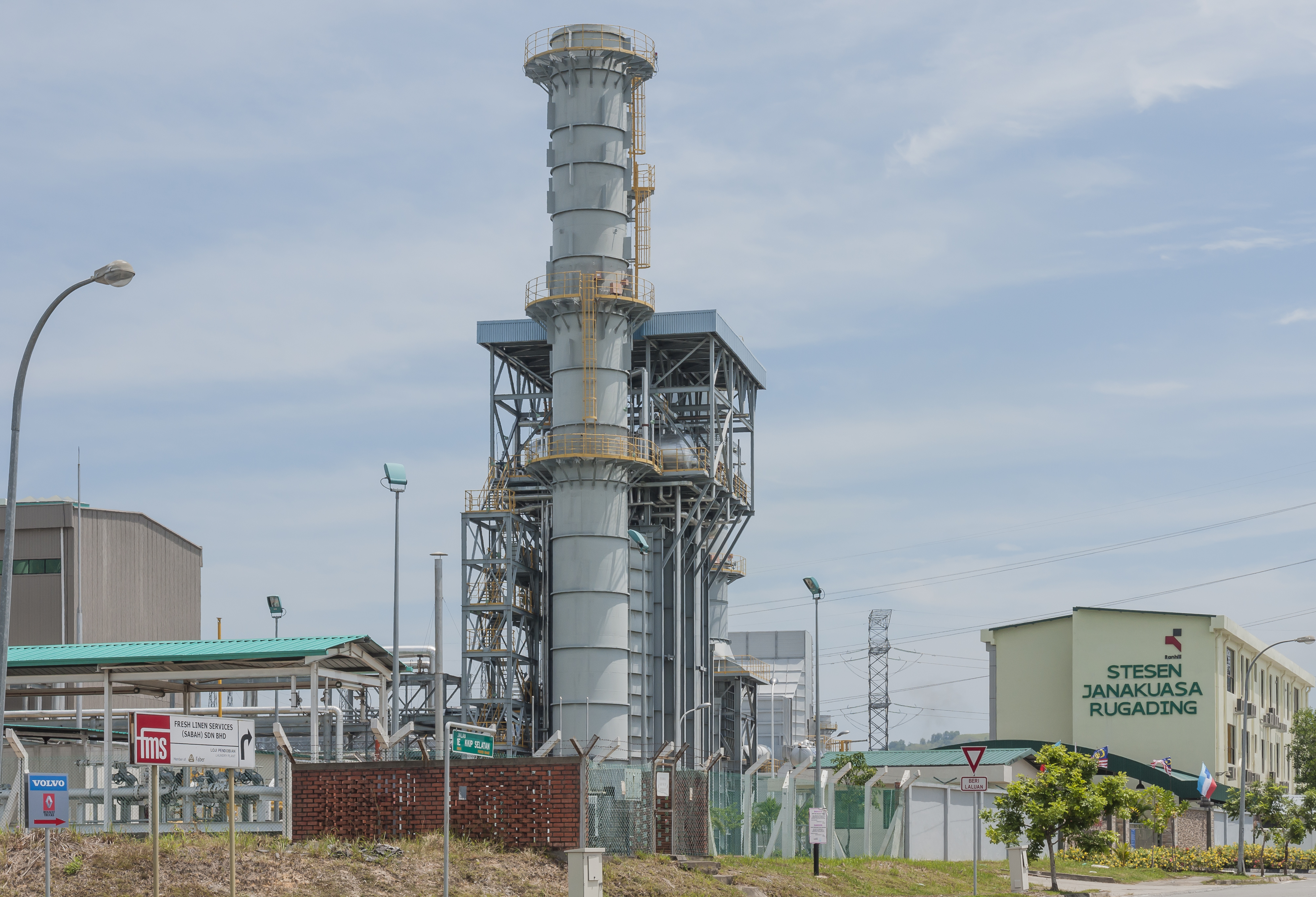
Ranhill Rugading Power Station in Kota Kinabalu, Sabah

- As of May 2024, YTL Power and SIPP Power collectively own a 53.19% stake in Ranhill, becoming the major shareholder of Ranhill Utilities Bhd (Ranhill), a company involved in three key segments, namely, environment, energy and engineering services. This acquisition is a strategic fit for both parties as it would give YTL Power the access to exclusive Johor water operations, allowing it to capitalise on prospects from the Johor-Singapore Special Economic Zone (SEZ) and potential demand from Johor’s data center hubs.. Ranhill is the second-largest water supply operation in Malaysia and undertakes the exclusive rights of the entire water supply network in the State of Johor through its operating company, Ranhill SAJ Sdn Bhd. As of December 2023, it has been operating 46 water treatment plants state-wide with a total treatment capacity of 2,171 million litres daily. Moreover, Ranhill has a presence in the Sabah power sector, operating two 190MW Combined Cycle Gas Turbine power plants in Kota Kinabalu. In February 2024, Ranhill achieved commercial operation date for their renewable energy (RE) sector through its 50MW large scale solar (LSS) plant in Bidor, Perak. Additionally, Ranhill is involved in multi-disciplinary engineering, procurement and construction management (EPCM), project management consultancy (PMC), as well as operations and maintenance (O&M) services Ranhill has been listed on Bursa Malaysia since 16 December 2015 on the Main Market of the exchange under the Gas, Water and Multi-Utilities sub-sector of Utilities sector. As of June 2024, the market capitalisation of Ranhill is RM 2.14 billion.

PT Jawa Power & PT Jawa Timur – Indonesia

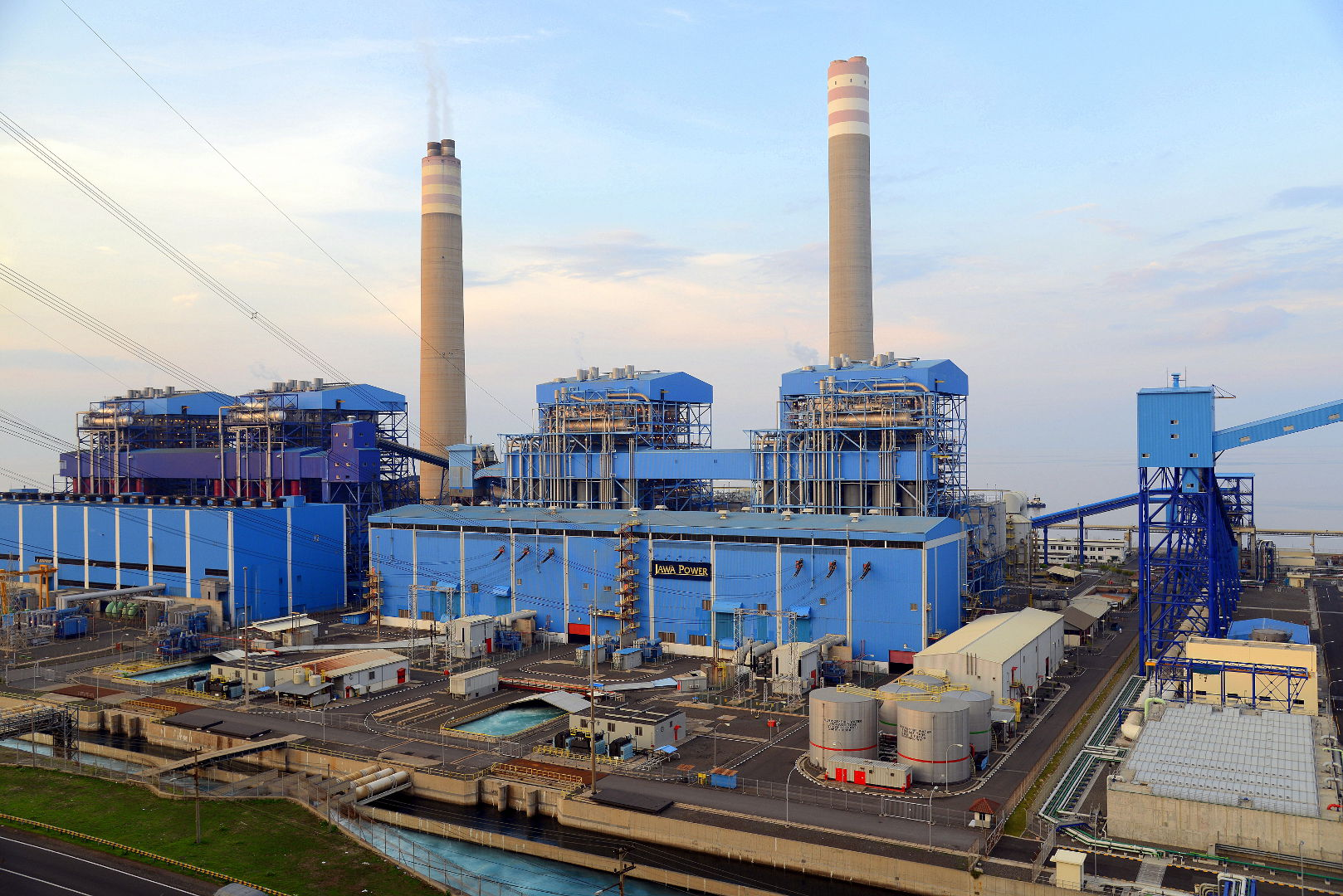

In 2004, YTL Power acquired a 35% stake in PT Jawa Power, the second largest IPP in Indonesia, which owns a 1,220 MW coal-fired power plant located at the Paiton Power Generation Complex in East Java, Indonesia. Jawa Power has a 30-year PPA with PT PLN (Persero), the state-owned electric utility company. PT Jawa Timur, a wholly owned subsidiary of YTL Power handles the operation and maintenance for PT Jawa Power.

Attarat Power Company (APCO) - Hashemite Kingdom of Jordan

YTL Power owns a 45% equity interest in Attarat Power Company (APCO), which owns and operates the 470MW (net) oil shale-fired mine-mouth power plant in Jordan, located at Attarat um Ghudran, about 100 km southeast of Amman. The total project cost is approximately USD 2.1 billion. It is the largest private sector project in Jordan’s history and also the largest Chinese project financing for a project outside China covered by Sinosure.

APCO has a 30-year power purchase agreement (PPA) with the National Electric Power Company (NEPCO), Jordan’s state-owned utility, for the entire electrical capacity and energy of the power plant, with an option for NEPCO to extend the power purchase agreement to 40 years (from the commercial operation date of the project’s second unit). The power plant commenced operations in 2023.

== See also ==
- YTL Corporation
- National Grid, Malaysia
- YTL PowerSeraya Pte Limited
- YTL Communications
