= Yeoh Tiong Lay =

Malaysian businessman (1929–2017)

Yang Berbahagia Tan Sri Dato' Seri Yeoh Tiong Lay PSM SPMS SPDK DPMS PJK KMN PPN
- 楊忠禮
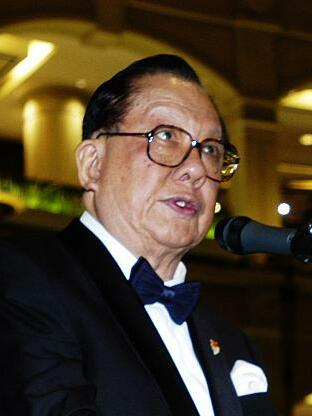
- Born: 18 December 1929; Klang, Selangor, Federated Malay States (now Malaysia)
- Died: 18 October 2017 (aged 87); Kuala Lumpur, Malaysia
- Burial place: Nilai Memorial Park
- Occupations: Chairman, YTL Corporation
- Spouse: Puan Sri Datin Seri Tan Kai Yong
- Children: 7, including Francis Yeoh and Yeoh Soo Keng

Chinese name
- Simplified Chinese: 杨忠礼
- Traditional Chinese: 楊忠禮
- Hanyu Pinyin: Yáng Zhōnglǐ
- Jyutping: Joeng4 Zung1 Lai5
- Hokkien POJ: Iûⁿ Tiong-lé / Iôⁿ Tiong-lé
- Tâi-lô: Iûnn Tiong-lé / Iônn Tiong-lé

Yeoh Tiong Lay (Chinese: 楊忠禮; 18 December 1929 – 18 October 2017) was a Malaysian billionaire businessman and philanthropist. He founded YTL Corporation, Malaysia's largest conglomerate, with interests in construction, utilities, hotels, property development and technology. YTL is based primarily in Malaysia but has extensive operations in Asia, Australia and the United Kingdom, where it owns the utility Wessex Water.

In 2013, he established the Yeoh Tiong Lay Centre for Politics, Philosophy & Law at King's College, London with a gift of US$11 million.

== Early life ==
A Malaysian Chinese of Kinmen and Zhangzhou Hokkien roots, Yeoh Tiong Lay was the third eldest child in his family. He completed his secondary school education at Hin Hua High School in Klang, Malaysia.

== Career ==
Yeoh was one of the richest individuals in Malaysia; his family is estimated to have a net worth of US$3 billion as of October 2017.

== Personal life ==
Yeoh married Tan Kai Yong in 1952 and they were married for 65 years until his death in 2017.

He is the father of Francis Yeoh, Yeoh Soo Min, Victor Yeoh Seok Kian, Yeoh Seok Hong, Michael Yeoh, Yeoh Soo Keng and Mark Yeoh, all of whom are involved in the YTL Group and leading their own respective divisions. At the time of his death, he had 27 grandchildren (including Ruth Yeoh, Michelle Yeoh, Rebekah Yeoh and Rachel Yeoh) as well as 5 great-grandchildren.

Involved with charitable societies in Malaysia, he lent financial support to various educational establishments, and was chairman of Hin Hua High School, his alma mater.

He died on 18 October 2017.

== Honours ==
=== Honours of Malaysia ===
- Malaysia
  - Commander of the Order of Loyalty to the Crown of Malaysia (PSM) – Tan Sri (1985)
  - Officer of the Order of the Defender of the Realm (KMN) (1983)
  - Medal of the Order of the Defender of the Realm (PPN) (1967)
- Sabah
  - Grand Commander of the Order of Kinabalu (SPDK) – Datuk Seri Panglima (2013)
  - Yeoh was also one of the Pro-Chancellors of Universiti Malaysia Sabah in Kota Kinabalu, Sabah with Tan Sri Datuk Seri Panglima Musa Aman, the Chief Minister of Sabah.
- Selangor
  - Knight Grand Commander of the Order of the Crown of Selangor (SPMS) – Dato' Seri (1996)
  - Knight Commander of the Order of the Crown of Selangor (DPMS) – Dato' (1983)
  - Recipient of the Meritorious Service Medal (PJK) (1967)

=== Foreign honours ===
- Japan
  - 3rd Class, Gold Rays with Neck Ribbon of the Order of the Rising Sun (2008), conferred by the Emperor of Japan for his efforts in promoting bilateral relations between Malaysia and Japan.
- Taiwan
  - 4th class of the Order of Brilliant Star (2015), conferred by the President of the Republic of China Ma Ying-jeou in recognition of his contributions to the educational and cultural development of Taiwan.
