= List of statutory instruments of the United Kingdom, 1959 =

This is an incomplete list of statutory instruments of the United Kingdom in 1959.

== Statutory instruments ==
=== 1-499 ===
- Magistrates' Courts (Maintenance Orders Act, 1958) Rules 1959 (SI 1959/3) (L. 1)
- Gasswater A Mine (Storage Battery Locomotives) Special Regulations 1959 (SI 1959/37)
- Gasswater B Mine (Storage Battery Locomotives) Special Regulations 1959 (SI 1959/38)
- Airways Corporations (General Staff, Pilots and Officers Pensions) (Amendment) Regulations 1959 (SI 1959/42)
- Agriculture Act, 1958 (Appointed Day) (England and Wales) Order 1959 (SI 1959/80)
- Reserve and Auxiliary Forces (Agricultural Tenants) Regulations 1959 (SI 1959/84)
- Copyright Act, 1956 (Transitional Extension) Order 1959 (SI 1959/103)
- Agriculture (Miscellaneous Time-Limits) Regulations 1959 (SI 1959/171)
- Public Record Office (Fees) Order 1959 (SI 1959/181)
- Superannuation (Polish Education Committee and Civil Services) Transfer Rules 1959 (SI 1959/191)
- Milk and Dairies (General) Regulations 1959 (SI 1959/277)
- Family Allowances, National Insurance and Industrial Injuries (European Interim Agreement) Order 1959 (SI 1959/292)
- National Insurance (European Interim Agreement) Order 1959 (SI 1959/293)
- Holyrood Park Regulations 1959 (SI 1959/302)
- North East Lincolnshire Water Order 1959 (SI 1959/358)
- Schools Regulations 1959 (SI 1959/364)
- Handicapped Pupils and Special Schools Regulations 1959 (SI 1959/365)
- Maintenance Orders (Facilities for Enforcement) Order 1959 (SI 1959/377)
- Service Departments Registers Order 1959 (SI 1959/406)
- Food Hygiene (Scotland) Regulations 1959 (SI 1959/413) (S. 16)
- Agriculture (Circular Saws) Regulations 1959 (SI 1959/427)
- Craven Water Board Order 1959 (SI 1959/433)
- Food Standards (Ice-Cream) Regulations 1959 (SI 1959/472)

=== 500-999 ===
- North West Sussex Water Order 1959 (SI 1959/552)
- Preston and District Water Board Order 1959 (SI 1959/588)
- Glass Houghton Mine (Shuttle Cars) Special Regulations 1959 (SI 1959/663)
- Government Oil Pipe-Lines Regulations 1959 (SI 1959/715)
- Government Oil Pipe-Lines (No. 2) Regulations 1959 (SI 1959/724)
- Military Pensions (Commonwealth Relations Office) Regulations 1959 (SI 1959/735)
- Leicester (Amendment of Local Enactments) Order 1959 (1959/785)
- Arsenic in Food Regulations 1959 (SI 1959/831)
- Visiting Forces Act (Application to Colonies) (Amendment) Order 1959 (SI 1959/874)
- Visiting Forces (Designation) (Colonies) (Amendment) Order 1959 (SI 1959/875)
- Post-War Credit (Income Tax) Regulations 1959 (SI 1959/876)
- First-aid Boxes in Factories Order 1959 (SI 1959/906)
- Opencast Coal (Concurrent Orders and Requisitions) Regulations 1959 (SI 1959/980)
- Opencast Coal (Annual Value in Special Cases) Regulations 1959 (SI 1959/981)

=== 1000-1499 ===
- Cambridge Waterworks Order 1959 (SI 1959/1131)
- Exeter (Water Charges) Order 1959 (SI 1959/1135)
- Opencast Coal (Claims) Regulations 1959 (SI 1959/1146)
- Coal Mines (Clearances in Transport Roads) Regulations 1959 (SI 1959/1217)
- Compensation (Occasional Use of Land for Defence Training purposes) (War Office) Regulations 1959 (SI 1959/1289)
- Foreign Compensation (Roumania) (Registration) (Amendment) Order 1959 (SI 1959/1295)
- Geneva Conventions Act (Colonial Territories) Order in Council 1959 (SI 1959/1301)
- Evidence (New Zealand) Order 1959 (SI 1959/1306)
- Civil Aviation Act (Application to Crown Aircraft) Order 1959 (SI 1959/1309)
- Diseases of Animals (Ascertainment of Compensation) Order 1959 (SI 1959/1335)
- Governors' Pensions (Allocation) Rules 1959 (SI 1959/1347)
- Manorial Documents Rules 1959 (SI 1959/1399)
- Exmouth Water Order 1959 (SI 1959/1469)

=== 1500-1999 ===
- Superannuation (Local Government, Social Workers and Health Education Staff) Interchange Rules 1959 (SI 1959/1573)
- West Wilts Water Board Order 1959 (SI 1959/1965)
- Direct Grant Schools Regulations 1959 (SI 1959/1832)
- Gas Cylinders (Conveyance) Regulations 1959 (SI 1959/1919)
- Superannuation (British Council and Civil Service) Transfer Rules 1959 (SI 1959/1922)
- Superannuation (Imperial Institute and Civil Service) Transfer Rules 1959 (SI 1959/1923)
- Felixstowe and District Water Order 1959 (SI 1959/1948)
- Tithe Redemption Commission (Transfer of Functions and Dissolution) Order 1959 (SI 1959/1971)
- Visiting Forces Act (Application to Colonies) (Amendment No. 2) Order 1959 (SI 1959/1979)
- Superannuation (National Assistance Board) Transfer Rules 1959 (SI 1959/1985)

=== 2000-2499 ===
- East Cornwall Water Board Order 1959 (SI 1959/2001)
- Poole and East Dorset Water Board Order 1959 (SI 1959/2024)
- Motor Vehicles (Construction and Use) (Track Laying Vehicles) (Amendment) Regulations 1959 (SI 1959/2053)
- Whaling Industry (Ship) (Amendment) Regulations 1959 (SI 1959/2054)
- Ebbw Vale (Water Charges) Order 1959 (SI 1959/2060)
- Agriculture (Lifting of Heavy Weights) Regulations 1959 (SI 1959/2120)
- Merchant Shipping (Certificates of Competency as A.B.) (Canada) Order 1959 (SI 1959/2213)
- Miscellaneous Mines (Explosives) Regulations 1959 (SI 1959/2258)

== See also ==
- List of statutory instruments of the United Kingdom
