= Nirvana Memorial Park =

Cemetery in Semenyih, Selangor, Malaysia

Coordinates: 3°03′01.5″N 101°52′01.9″E

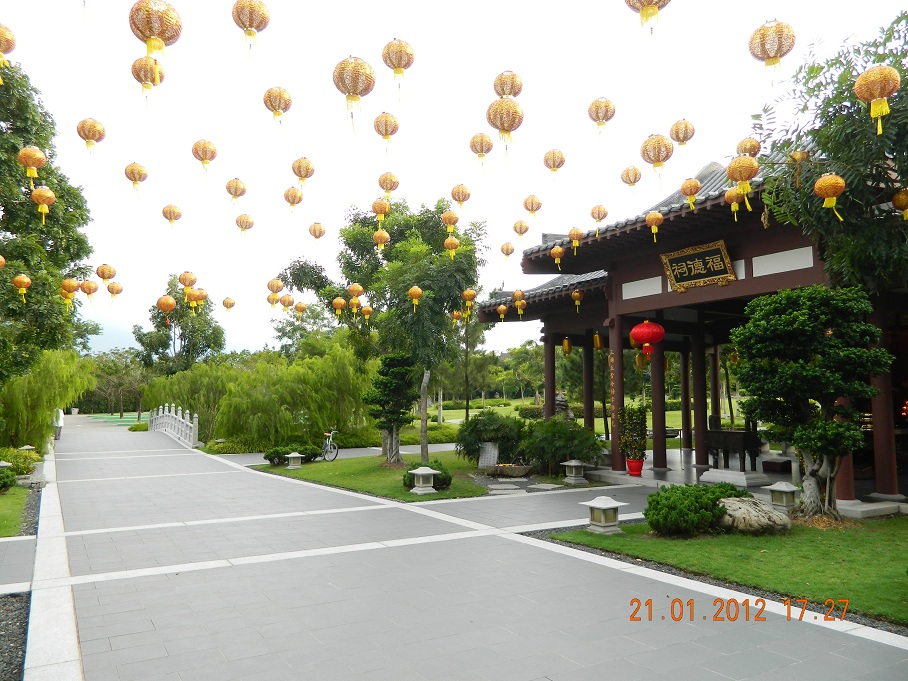
- Interactive map of Nirvana Memorial Park

Details
- Location: Semenyih, Selangor
- Country: Malaysia
- Type: Private cemetery
- Owned by: Nirvana Multi Asia Sdn Bhd (NVMA)
- Website: Official website
- Find a Grave: Nirvana Memorial Park

Nirvana Memorial Park (Chinese: 富貴山莊~~私營風景墓園) is a private cemetery and mortuary in Semenyih, Selangor, Malaysia. The longest dragon statue in Malaysia is located here. It is 1,000 feet long and serves as a columbarium. It is fully air conditioned inside. Nirvana was established in 1985 by David Kong and is touted as the largest funeral service in Southeast Asia. It also serves as a pet cemetery.

== 2026 urn theft ==
In March 2026, Polis Diraja Malaysia confirmed that a number of urns were stolen from a columbarium in the memorial park. A similar theft was reported at Perpetual Memorial Park in Kulai, Johor, and Xiao En Memorial Park in Nilai, Negeri Sembilan. The theft was suspected to be related to a cross-border criminal group holding the ashes of deceased for ransom. Nirvana have since confirmed that all stolen urns were recovered. Nirvana was later sued by a family for negligence after two urns containing their parents were stolen.

== Notable burials ==
- Bai Guang (1921–1999), famous singer & one of the Seven Great Singing Stars
- Shuba Jaya (1976–2014), actress and victim of Malaysia Airlines MH17
- Teoh Beng Hock (1979–2009), political secretary
