= PowerSeraya =

Electricity producer in Singapore

YTL PowerSeraya Pte. Limited is an electricity producer in Singapore, generating about 30% of the country’s energy needs. The company also offers oil trading and storage services. Its core business with a licensed generating capacity of 3,100MW is situated on Jurong Island. YTL PowerSeraya sells electricity to customers through its retail arm, Seraya Energy, and manages fuel purchases through its oil trading arm, PetroSeraya. Its corporate office is located at Alexandra Road.

The Seraya power station itself is the first offshore power station in Singapore. It began operating in January 1987.

== History ==
Originally part of Singapore Power, the company was part of Temasek Holdings from 2001. On 6 March 2009, the company was divested from Temasek Holdings to become a wholly owned subsidiary of YTL Power International Berhad. On 1 April 2012, the company was renamed YTL PowerSeraya Pte. Limited.

In July 2023, EMA launched a request for proposal to increase generation capacity to meet the projected growth in demand and maintain system reliability which the request was closed on 31 October. In 2024, EMA announced that YTL PowerSeraya won the right to build, own and operate a hydrogen-ready combined cycle gas turbine turbine to be completed by end 2027. The turbine will have a capacity of 600 MW and built as an extension to the existing Pulau Seraya Power Station on Jurong Island. The turbine can use up to 30 per cent hydrogen and 70 per cent fossil fuels for electricity generation while also have the ability to be retrofitted to be fully powered by hydrogen as needed.

== PetroSeraya ==
PetroSeraya Pte Ltd, a subsidiary of PowerSeraya Limited, was established in April 2007. Its establishment forms part of PowerSeraya's diversification strategy to move into the non-regulated business and complements its core business of energy wholesaling and retailing. PetroSeraya plays a key role in managing PowerSeraya's fuel purchases – which form a significant component in the generation cost – as well as optimising the parent company's existing fuel management assets, such as tanks and jetties.

== See also ==
- Energy law
