= Wessex Water =

Company in England

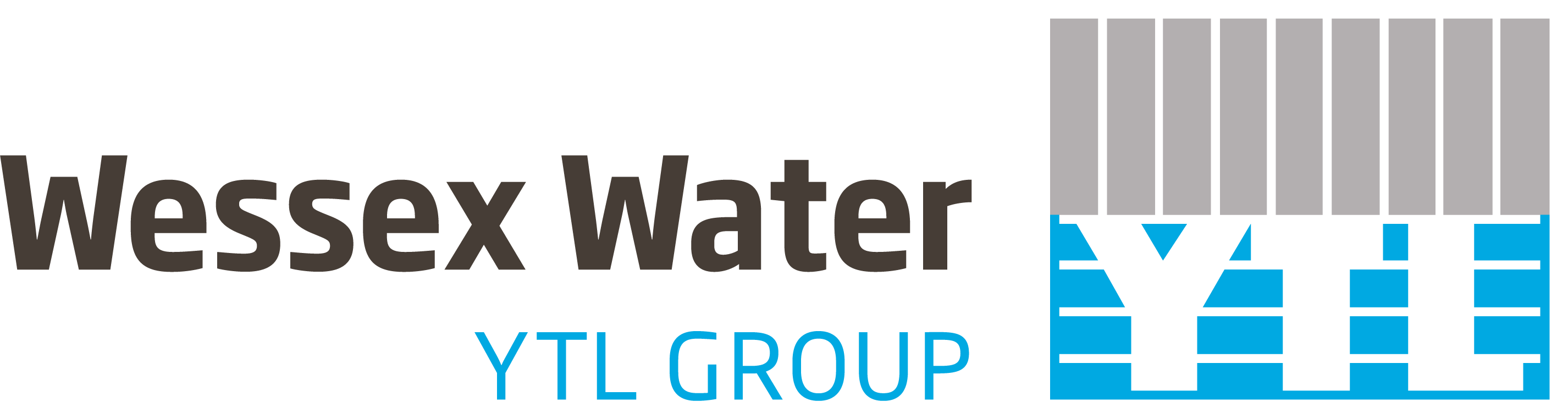
- Type: Private company
- Industry: Water industry
- Founded: 1973
- Headquarters: Bath, Somerset
- Key people: Francis Yeoh (Chairperson); Ruth Jefferson (CEO); Andy Pymer (CFO)
- Products: Drinking water; Recycled wastewater
- Production output: 0.270 Gl/day (drinking); 0.460 Gl/day (recycled)
- Services: Water supply and sewerage services
- Revenue: ▲£ 552.3 million (2020); £547.7 million (2019)
- Operating income: ▼£ 212.5 million (2020); £228.4 million (2019)
- Net income: ▼£ 66.6 million (2020); £110.2 million (2019)
- Number of employees: 2,547
- Parent: YTL Corporation, of Malaysia
- Website: www.wessexwater.co.uk

Wessex Water Services Limited, known as Wessex Water, is a water supply and sewerage utility company serving an area of South West England, covering 10,000 square kilometres including Bristol, most of Dorset, Somerset, and Wiltshire, with parts of Gloucestershire and Hampshire.

The company is regulated under the Water Industry Act 1991. In 2016, it had about 2,100 employees.

Wessex Water is owned by the Malaysian power company YTL Corporation. Its headquarters are at Claverton Down, on the outskirts of Bath, Somerset.

== Creation and ownership ==
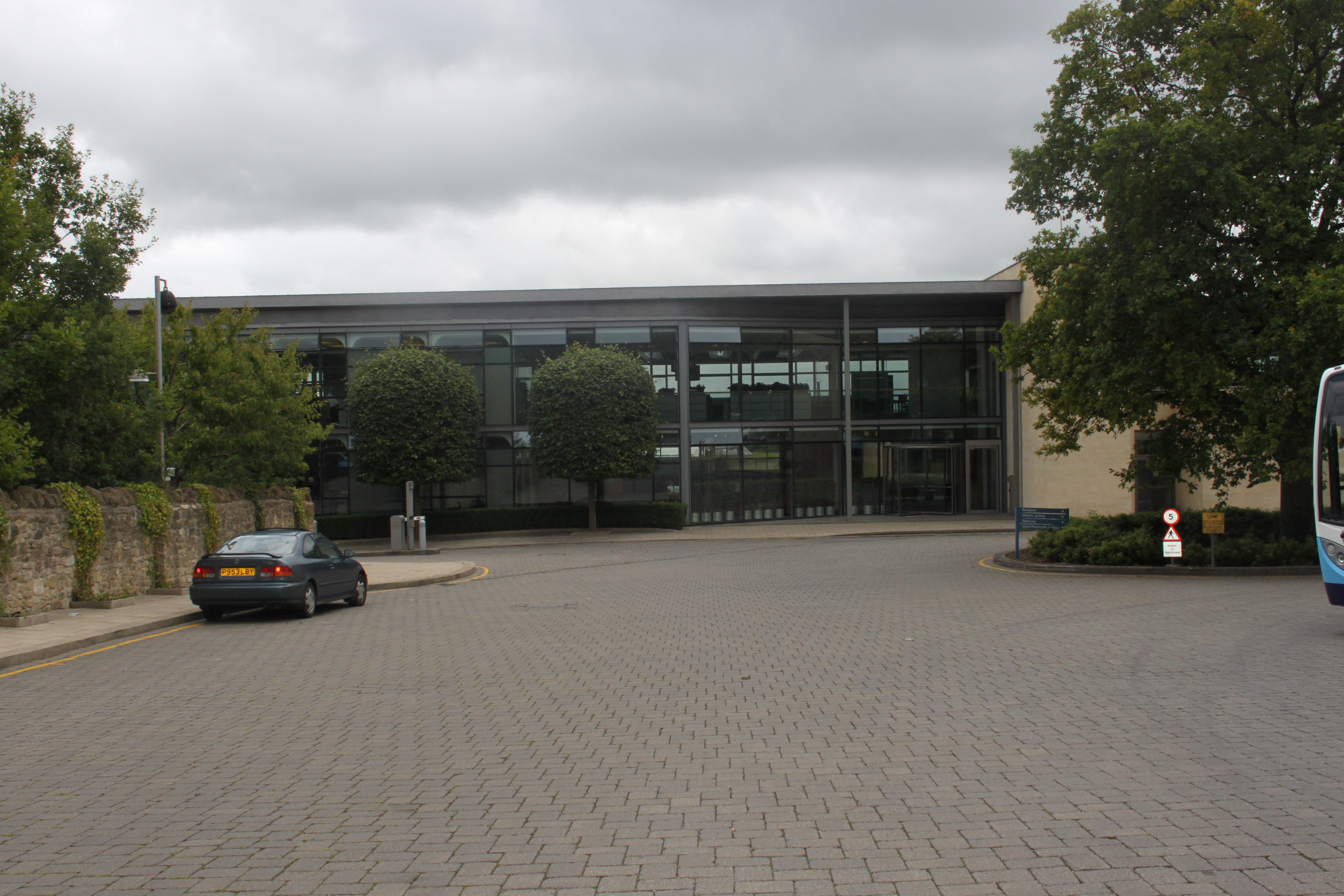
Headquarters building in Bath

The company originated as the Wessex Water Authority, one of ten regional water authorities established by the Water Act 1973. These bodies were privatised in 1989. Wessex Water Services Limited was purchased by American company Enron in 1998 for $2.4 billion and placed in a newly formed subsidiary, Azurix. In 2002, following Enron's collapse, Wessex Water was sold to YTL Power International of Malaysia.

The water authority had acquired the assets and duties of a number of public sector and local authority water utilities:

- Bristol Avon River Authority
- Somerset River Authority
- Avon and Dorset River Authority (except the part of the area of that drains to the River Lim)
- Bath Corporation Waterworks
- Dorset Water Board
- North Wilts Water Board
- South Wilts Water Board
- Wessex Water Board
- West Somerset Water Board
- West Wilts Water Board
- West Lulworth Water Undertaking

Five private statutory water companies were within the water authority's area of operations, and continued to operated:

- Bournemouth and District Water Company
- Bristol Waterworks Company
- Cholderton and District Water Company
- West Hampshire Water Company

Bournemouth Water and West Hampshire Water merged in 1994 to form Bournemouth and West Hampshire Water.

Wessex Water's headquarters are at Claverton Down, on the outskirts of Bath, in a modern energy-efficient building by Bennetts Associates and Buro Happold.

As of 2026, the operating company Wessex Water Services Limited is owned by Wessex Water Limited, the first in a chain of eight holding companies based in the UK, Cayman Islands, Malaysia and ultimately Yeoh Tiong Lay & Sons Family Holdings Ltd in Jersey.

=== Predecessors ===
==== Bath Corporation Waterworks ====
Bath Corporation Waterworks was created by the Bath Act 1870 (33 & 34 Vict. c. liii).

==== Dorset Water Board ====
The West Dorset Water Board was constituted by the West Dorset Water Board Order 1958 (SI 1958/1607).

The Poole and East Dorset Water Board was constituted under the Poole and East Dorset Water Board Order 1959 (SI 1959/2024). It took over the Poole Corporation Waterworks.

==== North Wilts Water Board ====
The North Wilts Water Board Order 1963 (SI 1963/63) changed the name of the North West Wilts Water Board to the North Wilts Water Board.

The North West Wilts Water Board was constituted under the North West Wilts Water Board Order 1962 (SI 1962/813).

==== South Wilts Water Board ====
The South Wilts Water Board was constituted by the South Wilts Water Board Order 1966 (SI 1966/1425).

==== Wessex Water Board ====
The Wessex Water Board was constituted by the Wessex Water Board Order 1963 (SI 1963/153).

==== West Somerset Water Board ====
The West Somerset Water Board was constituted by the West Somerset Water Board Order 1962 (SI 1962/2871).

==== West Wilts Water Board ====
The West Wilts Water Board was constituted under the West Wilts Water Board Order 1959 (SI 1959/1965). It took over the Trowbridge, Melksham and District Water Board, the Shaftesbury Corporation Waterworks, and the water undertakings of the urban district councils of Warminster and Westbury, and the rural district councils of Mere and Tisbury, Shaftesbury, and Warminster and Westbury.

Trowbridge, Melksham and District Water Board was formed by the Trowbridge, Melksham and District Water Board Act 1931 (21 & 22 Geo. 5. c. xlvii). It had offices in Silver Street, Trowbridge. The water board took over the existing works of the Trowbridge Water Company, formed by the Trowbridge Water Act 1873 (36 & 37 Vict. c. cxxxiv), replacing the earlier non-statutory Trowbridge and District New Water Company which had been founded in 1871.

==== West Lulworth Water Undertaking ====
The West Lulworth Water Undertaking was an unincorporated water undertaking created by the West Lulworth Water Order 1887 giving Reginald Joseph Weld of Lulworth Castle the right to supply water; a right that could be transferred to another individual or company.

== Operations ==
=== Reservoirs and lakes ===
The company owns and manages several reservoirs including Blashford Lakes in Hampshire, Clatworthy Reservoir, Durleigh Reservoir, Hawkridge Reservoir, Otterhead Lakes, Sutton Bingham Reservoir, and Tucking Mill in Somerset. In addition to supplying drinking water, many these are nature reserves and are used for recreation.

=== GENeco ===
Wessex Water's GENeco subsidiary, established in 2009, operates sewage treatment works. It recycles waste, produces renewable energy and provides the agricultural industry with fertiliser. In summer 2010, GENeco launched the Bio-Bug, a modified VW Beetle that runs on bio-gas generated from waste treated at sewage treatment works. Waste flushed down the toilets of just 70 homes in Bristol is enough to power the Bio-Bug for a year, based on an annual mileage of 10,000 miles.

In November 2014, the UK's first bus powered entirely by human and food waste went into service between Bristol and Bath, run by tour operator Bath Bus Company. Since 2019, biomethane powers buses on one of Bristol's MetroBus routes. The gas is produced at the company's "bioresources and renewable energy park" in Avonmouth, which is run by GENeco.

=== Usage restrictions ===
On 18 August 2026, Wessex Water implemented a hosepipe ban during drought conditions; this was their first such action since 1976.

== Performance ==
Wessex Water achieved a score of 4.53 in Ofwat's 'Satisfaction by company' survey 2012/13 (5 being ‘very satisfied’).

In 2013, Wessex Water's compliance with drinking water standards exceeded 99.9% and the company maintained 100% compliance with sewage treatment discharge consents.

In both 2011/12 and 2012/13, the company's leakage figure was 69 million litres per day, compared to a yearly average of 73 million litres per day between 2005 and 2010.

Wessex Water's greenhouse gas emissions totalled 119 kilotonnes of CO_{2} equivalent in 2018/19, compared to 149 kilotonnes of CO_{2} equivalent in 2011/12 and 159 kilotonnes in 2012/13.

== Key people ==
Ruth Jefferson has been chief executive of Wessex Water since October 2024. Colin Skellet was the chief executive from 1988 to 2024; he continues as group chief executive with overall responsibility for all YTL's UK activities. Skellet was appointed OBE in the 2012 Birthday Honours for services to business and to the WaterAid organisation. As of 2026, Andy Pymer is the chief financial officer.

Francis Yeoh, a long-serving director of YTL Corporation and currently the executive chairman of the conglomerate, is non-executive chairman of the board of Wessex Water.

== Environmental and safety record ==
- May 1998 – Found guilty of discharging over 1 million gallons of raw sewage into a Weymouth, Dorset, marina on August Bank Holiday Monday 1997, the busiest day of the year. The company was fined £5,000 with £500 costs.
- March 1999 – Ranked 4th in the top ten list of "worst polluters" in England by the Environment Agency.
- May 2002 – Fined £8,000 for causing pollution in Dowlais Brook, Cwmbran in June 2001.
- April 2003 – Fined £5,000 with £1,000 costs at Minehead Magistrates' Court after pleading guilty to causing poisonous, noxious or polluting matter to enter the Washford River in Somerset.
- July 2003 – Described by the Environment Agency as one of the worst "repeat offenders" for pollution incidents.
- 2004 – Fined six times for environmental pollution incidents.
- May 2007 – Fined £1,500 with £1,589 costs by Bristol magistrates after pleading guilty to one offence under the Water Resources Act 1991 of causing sewage to enter controlled waters. Untreated sewage had been allowed to pollute the River Frome in July 2006. The river was polluted again with untreated sewage at Frampton Cotterell in February 2007 and April 2007.
- April 2008 – Fined £3,000 with £1,960 costs for allowing sewage to pollute the River Stour.
- March 2010 – Fined £6,000 with £2,235 costs at Weymouth Magistrates' Court after allowing sewage to pollute the River Stour near Shaftesbury in March 2009.
- 3 December 2020 − Four people, three of them Wessex Water employees, were killed in an explosion at a company site in Avonmouth, where GENeco ran a bio-methane anaerobic digestor. The official investigation into this were closed in 2024 due to "insufficient evidence" for a manslaughter conviction.
