= Jurong Rock Caverns =

Singaporean commercial oil storage

The Jurong Rock Caverns (JRC) (Chinese: 裕廊岛地下储油库, Malay: Gua Batu Simpanan Barang Mentah Jurong) is the first underground rock cavern for oil storage in Southeast Asia. It is owned by Jurong Town Corporation. The rock caverns were officially opened on 2 September 2014 by the third Prime Minister of Singapore, Lee Hsien Loong.

Located at a depth of 130 m (430 ft) beneath Banyan Basin on Jurong Island, the 61-hectare (150-acre) caverns, provide infrastructural support to companies on Jurong Island such as Shell, ExxonMobil and Chevron Philips, and meet the storage needs for liquid hydrocarbons such as crude oil, condensate, naphtha and gas oil.

The first phase comprises five 340 m (1,120 ft) long, 20 m (66 ft) wide and 27 m (89 ft) high caverns with nine storage galleries providing 1,470,000 cubic metres (52,000,000 cu ft) of storage, and 8 km (5 mi) of tunnels costing SGD 950 million. The second phase of 1.3 million cubic meter, double this capacity to 2.8 million cubic meters (100 million cu ft).
