= Bournemouth Water =

British water supply company

- Company type: Private company
- Industry: Water supply
- Founded: 1863
- Headquarters: Bournemouth, Dorset, England
- Parent: South West Water
- Website: bournemouthwater.co.uk

Bournemouth Water provides drinking water to approximately 500,000 people from the port town of Poole to Beaulieu in the New Forest and from Bournemouth to Salisbury in Wiltshire, an area of over 1000 square kilometres. (Note: In this area wastewater services are provided by Wessex Water or Southern Water)

== History ==
The company was formed from two former statutory water companies established by acts of Parliament.

The Bournemouth Gas and Water Company, as it was originally named, was established by the Bournemouth Gas and Water Act 1873 (36 & 37 Vict. c. lxxiii). The company was also a supplier of gas until the nationalisation of the gas industry in 1949, when it was renamed to the Bournemouth and District Water Company. It was established with waterworks in Bourne Valley and a reservoir in Parkstone. It became Bournemouth Water plc in 1991.

The West Hampshire Water Company was established by the West Hampshire Water Act 1893 (56 & 57 Vict. c. ccv).

In 1994 Bournemouth and West Hampshire Water was formed as the two companies merged.

In July 2010 Bournemouth and West Hampshire Water was acquired by Sembcorp Utilities. Sembcorp Utilities is a wholly owned subsidiary of Sembcorp Industries, an energy, water and marine group listed on the main board of the Singapore Exchange.

Bournemouth and West Hampshire Water plc's registered name was changed to Sembcorp Bournemouth Water Ltd on 21 January 2011; formerly named Sembcorp Bournemouth Water plc for less than 24 hours on that date as part of an efficient mergers and acquisitions deal.

On 16 April 2015 Pennon Group plc – who already owned South West Water, announced they had purchased Sembcorp Bournemouth Water for £100.3 million. On 1 April 2016, the water supply licence, and all assets and liabilities of Bournemouth Water were transferred to South West Water Limited. The Bournemouth Water name is retained as a trading name of South West Water; Bournemouth Water Limited was finally dissolved as a company in 2024.

== Notes and references ==
Notes
