= Pennon Group =

British water and utility company

Pennon Group plc
- Type: Public
- Traded as: LSE: PNN; FTSE 250 component
- Industry: Water and waste
- Founded: 1989
- Headquarters: Exeter, England, UK
- Key people: David Sproul (Executive Chair)
- Revenue: ▲£1,291.4 million (2026)
- Operating income: ▲£325.5 million (2026)
- Net income: ▲£92.6 million (2026)
- Subsidiaries: Bournemouth Water; South West Water; Bristol Water; Pennon Water Services; SES Water
- Website: pennon-group.co.uk

Pennon Group plc is a British water utility company based in Exeter, England. The company is listed on the London Stock Exchange and is a constituent of the FTSE 250 Index. Much of the company's profits come from its main subsidiary, South West Water.

== History ==
The company was founded in 1989 as South West Water plc at the time of the privatisation of the Water Industry in England. In 1993 it acquired Haul Waste and in 1995 it bought Blue Circle Waste Management. It changed its name to Pennon Group plc in 1998. By 2016, the company employed approximately 4,500 people, and provided water and sewerage to 1.7 million customers in South West England.

The company successfully saw off a takeover bid from Terra Firma in 2004. It acquired Thames Waste Management in 2004, Wyvern Waste in 2006, Grosvenor Waste Management and Skipaway Holdings in 2007 and Shore Recycling in 2008. In 2016, the group acquired Bournemouth Water in a deal worth £100 million, integrating the company with South West Water, but keeping the Bournemouth Water name.

On 8 July 2020, global investment firm KKR completed its £4.2 billion acquisition of waste firm Viridor from Pennon Group.

In June 2021, the company acquired Bristol Water for $563 million.

In January 2024, Pennon acquired SES Water for £380 million. The acquisition was cleared by the Competition and Markets Authority in June 2024.

In June 2024, the company announced the appointment of David Sprowle as its new chair, replacing Gill Rider the following month.

In September 2026, South West Water pleaded guilty to 18 charges involving hundreds of sewage spills at bathing sites and sensitive habitats and was fined £7.9 million. Pennon responded by announcing a £1 billion investment programme, paid for in large part by cutting its dividend and a making cash call to shareholders for £550 million.

== Operations ==
The company's main asset is South West Water, which supplies water and sewerage services in Devon, Cornwall, and parts of Dorset and Somerset. In 2006, South West Water covered 83% of the group's profits.
