= Hamdan Mohamad =

Malaysian businessman

Yang Berbahagia Tan Sri Hamdan Mohamad PSM
- Education: University of Western Australia; Imperial College London
- Occupations: Executive Director/ President, Ranhill Berhad
- Children: 4 children

Hamdan bin Mohamad is one of several Malaysian businessmen who spearheaded Malaysian companies to overseas nations. He is an executive director, president and chief executive of Ranhill Berhad. He joined Ranhill Bersekutu Sdn Bhd in 1981 and was appointed to the board of Ranhill on 15 November 2000. He completed his studies at the University of Western Australia in 1981 and was given the Master of Science in advanced concrete structures degree in 1986 from the Imperial College of Science and Technology in London, United Kingdom.

Dubbed as Malaysia's Water Baron, he also sits on the board of several private limited companies, including Ranhill Corporation Sdn Bhd and Lambang Optima Sdn Bhd, where he is also a major shareholder. In August 2024, Hamdan, also the founder of Ranhill, resigned as Chief Executive Officer following the takeover completion of the company by YTL Power and SIPP Power Sendirian Berhad.

== Honours ==
- Malaysia
  - Commander of the Order of Loyalty to the Crown of Malaysia (PSM) – Tan Sri (2003)
