= Oil industry in Singapore =

The oil industry in Singapore is accountable for part of the country's economy, with the country being dubbed the "undisputed oil hub in Asia." In 2007, Singapore exported approximately 68,100,000 tonnes (67,000,000 long tons; 75,100,000 short tons) of oil. The industry is concentrated on Jurong Island, which serves as the primary hub for the nation's energy and chemicals sector. Singapore has ranked as one of the top three oil refining centers in the world. Despite possessing no domestic crude oil reserves, the country has strategically leveraged its geographical location and advanced facilities to process over 1.5 million barrels of oil per day.

This massive refining capacity is supported by global energy giants and has enabled Singapore to maintain the world's largest bunkering port. According to the International Trade Administration (ITA), the country is a premier price-discovery center for refined products, ensuring its influence over energy markets disproportionate to its size. In 2025, Singapore hit a record 51,800,000 tonnes (51,000,000 long tons; 57,100,000 short tons) in just marine fuel sales.

== History ==
The petroleum industry in Singapore dates back to 1891. In 2007, the country exported approximately 68.1 million tons of petroleum. The same year, the Singaporean government published a report titled Energy for Growth, describing how the industry would be sustained.

== Sector organisation ==
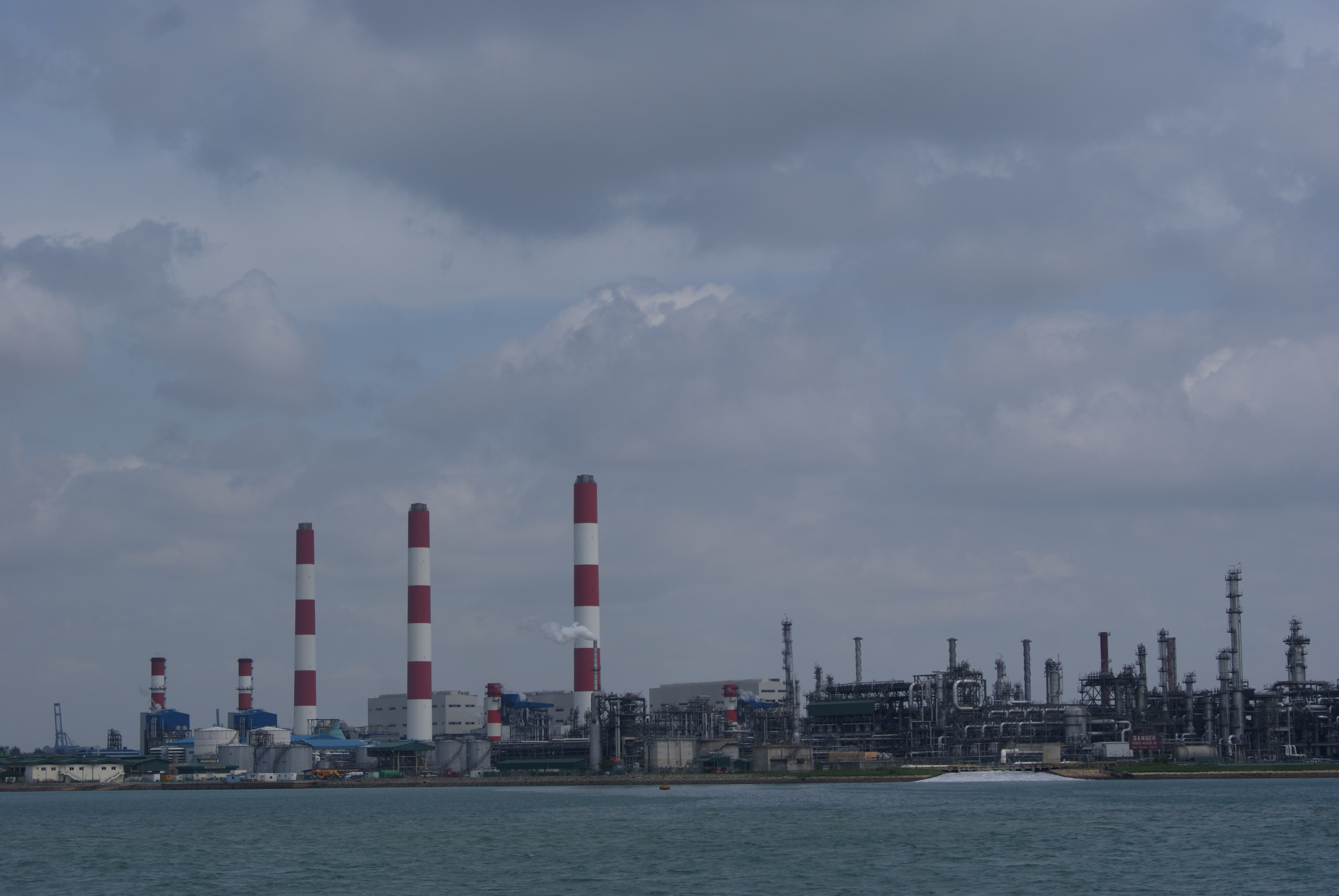
Jurong Island, photographed in February 2011

Jurong Island is where most of the country's oil industry's activities take place. Around 95 petroleum organisations are found there. According to The World Factbook, Singapore produces about 20,170 barrels of crude oil per day, ranking it 78th in the list of the world's oil producing countries. The government-owned Singapore National Oil Corporation (Abbreviation: SNOC) is in charge of the governance of the country's oil industry and protecting it.

== Value ==
Singapore is described as "the undisputed oil hub in Asia". The oil industry is responsible for some five percent of the country's gross domestic product (GDP). It generated an estimated S$57 billion dollars in 2009. Technology used for oil refinement and trading centres in Singapore is on the cutting edge, and many well-established petroleum businesses, such as ExxonMobil and Lanxess, are based in Singapore, owing to the country's "safe environment" and ideal trading location.

As a global financial hub, Singapore provides for 25 per cent to 35 per cent of commodities trading in Asia, according to International Enterprise Singapore, a government agency. It is also Asia's largest physical oil trading hub. Additionally, it is home to the world's largest bunkering port and the world's two largest oil rig builders SembCorp Marine and Keppel Corporation. Singapore traded 21% of the world market of more than 213 million metric tons of bunker fuel in 2019.

=== Supply ===
Singapore has never experienced a supply disruption of oil. The country maintains substantial strategic reserves and possesses a refining capacity that significantly exceeds domestic consumption. During the 2026 Strait of Hormuz crisis, Singapore has leveraged its position as a major refining hub to support partners such as Australia in securing their fuel supplies.

== See also ==
- Jurong Island
- Pulau Bukom
