= South West Water =

British water company

- Type: Private
- Industry: Water industry
- Founded: 1989
- Headquarters: Exeter, Devon
- Area served: South West England
- Key people: David Sproul(Chair)
- Products: Drinking water; Recycled wastewater
- Production output: 0.439 Gl/day (drinking); 0.439 Gl/day (recycled)
- Brands: Bournemouth Water
- Services: Water supply; Sewage treatment
- Revenue: ▲£0.587 billion (2022-23); £0.584 billion (2021-22)
- Number of employees: 1200
- Parent: Pennon Group
- Website: southwestwater.co.uk

South West Water is a British private utility company responsible for the water supply and waste water treatment services throughout Devon and Cornwall and in small areas of Dorset and Somerset. The company also supplies water in the south of England area under the name Bournemouth Water. South West Water was created in 1989 with the privatisation of the water industry. It was preceded by the South West Water Authority which was formed by the Water Act 1973 as one of ten regional water authorities formed by a merger of various statutory and local authority water undertakings. South West Water is part of the Pennon Group.

== History ==
The South West Water Authority was formed in 1973.

South West Water was formed in 1989 when the water industry in the United Kingdom was privatised. It is responsible for the supply of the region's drinking water, the treatment and disposal of sewage, and the protection of inland and bathing waters. It is regulated by Ofwat, the water services regulation authority, being required to conform to United Kingdom standards. Water from the Littlehampston treatment works, which serves about 162,000 people in the Torbay area of Devon, has on four separate occasions been contaminated by the dangerous cryptosporidium parasite, most recently in May 2024. In July 1988 the water supply to Camelford, served by the Lowermoor treatment works, was severely contaminated by aluminium sulphate. Many people had medical issues after this and some died.

SWW is part of the Pennon Group.

The following public utilities were taken over by the South West Water Authority in 1973 under the South West Water Authority Constitution Order 1973 (SI 1973/1307):

- Cornwall River Authority
- Devon River Authority
- Avon and Dorset River Authority (Note: Only the area of the authority which drained into the River Lim.)
- Plymouth Corporation Waterworks
- East Cornwall Water Board
- East Devon Water Board
- North and Mid Cornwall Water Board
- North Devon Water Board
- South Cornwall Water Board
- South West Devon Water Board
- West Cornwall Water Board

It was the subject of an episode of the fly-on-the-wall documentary Back to the Floor in 1997.

The business of Bournemouth Water was merged into South West Water in April 2016.

=== Predecessors ===
==== Plymouth Corporation Waterworks ====
Drake's Leat was constructed by Plymouth Corporation under the Plymouth Haven Act 1584 (27 Eliz. 1. c. 20). The Victualling Establishment, Plymouth Act 1824 (5 Geo. 4. c. 49) furthered the water supply for the Royal William Victualling Yard, giving the corporation powers to construct additional works and reservoirs to ensure the continued water supply to the town and naval establishments.

==== East Cornwall Water Board ====
The East Cornwall Water Board was established by the East Cornwall Water Board Order 1959 (SI 1959/2001), from the earlier South East Cornwall Water Board and the water undertakings of the councils of Launceston, Liskeard, Saltash, and Torpoint.

The South East Cornwall Water Board was formed by the South East Cornwall Water Board Act 1936 (26 Geo. 5 & 1 Edw. 8. c. xxx) from the water undertakings of Looe Urban District Council and St Germans Rural District.

==== East Devon Water Board ====
The East Devon Water Board was formed in 1950 and had offices in Honiton. It took over Exeter Corporation Waterworks.

The Exmouth and Budleigh Salterton Waterworks Company was incorporated by the Exmouth and Budleigh Salterton Waterworks Act 1864 (27 & 28 Vict. c. ccxlix).

==== North and Mid Cornwall Water Board ====
The North and Mid Cornwall Water Board was constituted by the North and Mid Cornwall Water Board Order 1965 (SI 1965/2197).

==== North Devon Water Board ====
The North Devon Water Board was constituted by the North Devon Water Board Act 1945 (9 & 10 Geo. 6. c. vi) from the Barnstable Water Company and rural district councils within its area.

The Barnstaple Water Company was authorised by the Barnstaple Waterworks Act 1858 (21 & 22 Vict. c. xx).

==== South Cornwall Water Board ====
The South Cornwall Water Board was created by the South Cornwall Water Board Order 1967 (SI 1967/1928). It has offices at 100 Pydar Street, Truro which it inherited from the Truro Water Company.

The Truro Water Company was formed by the Borough of Truro Waterworks Act 1869 (32 & 33 Vict. c. cxxxix) and the Truro Water Act 1875 (38 & 39 Vict. c. lxxxiv).

The Newquay and District Water Company was established by the Newquay and District Water Act 1882 (45 & 46 Vict. c. cvii).

The Falmouth Waterworks Company was constituted by the Falmouth Waterworks Act 1862 (25 & 26 Vict. c. xxxiii).

==== South West Devon Water Board ====
The South West Devon Water Board was established by the South West Devon Water Board Order 1963 (SI 1963/793).

The Kingsbridge and Salcombe Water Board was formed by the Kingsbridge and Salcombe Water Board Act 1930 (20 & 21 Geo. 5. c. lxxxi).

==== West Cornwall Water Board ====
The West Cornwall Water Board was constituted by the West Cornwall Water Board Order 1960 (SI 1960/155).

== Activities ==
The main source of the water supplied by South West Water is the twenty reservoirs they own, with 90% of the water coming from reservoirs and rivers. Upper Tamar Lake has facilities for angling and watersports, and is used by a number of local clubs including fishing and model yachting clubs. The South West Lakes Trust is a charitable organisation that manages fifty inland water sites across Cornwall, Devon and West Somerset, attracting around two million visitors annually.

== Problems ==
SWW has been responsible for many problems regarding the supply of water. As of June 2026, when the company was fined £1.85 million after pleading guilty to failures leading to an outbreak of hundreds of cases of cryptosporidiosis that required thousands of households to boil their water, it had had 22 criminal convictions since June 2014.

In September 2026, SWW pleaded guilty to 18 charges involving hundreds of sewage spills at bathing sites and sensitive habitats and was fined £7.9 million. The court found this amounted to reckless failures in management systems and inadequate responses to known risks. The company responded by announcing a £1 billion investment programme.

== See also ==
- Water Industry Act 1991
- Surfers against Sewage
