= Garden International School =

Coordinates: 03°10′04″N 101°38′52″E

Garden International School Malaysia
- Kuala Lumpur; Malaysia

Information
- Former names: Garden School
- Type: International school
- Motto: Plus est en vous
- Established: 1951
- Founder: Sally Watkins
- President: BK Gan
- Principal: Peter J. Derby-Crook MBE
- Gender: Co-Educational
- Houses: Chancellor; Crest; Sultan; Queen
- Affiliations: Council of International Schools
- Website: gardenschool.edu.my

Garden International School (GIS) is a private, co-educational international school in Mont Kiara, Segambut, Kuala Lumpur, Malaysia. Founded in 1951, GIS is one of the oldest and most prestigious private schools in Malaysia. GIS is part of the Taylor's Education Group and a member of the Federation of British International Schools in Asia (FOBISIA).

GIS provides English-based education for students ages 3 to 18 years old, with an Early Years Centre (age 3–5), Primary School (age 5–11) and Secondary School (age 11–18). GIS is one of the biggest private co-educational schools in Malaysia, with around 2,000 students.

Accredited by the Council of International Schools, GIS offers the National Curriculum for England, including providing IGCSE and A Levels examinations.

== History ==
=== Origins ===
Founded in 1951 as Garden School, the school was established by Sally Watkins, the wife of Kuala Lumpur Fire Brigade Chief Lt. Col. F.F.C. Watkins, in the Lake Gardens of Kuala Lumpur. It was one of the first international schools catering for expatriates in the Federation of Malaya.

=== Campus location ===
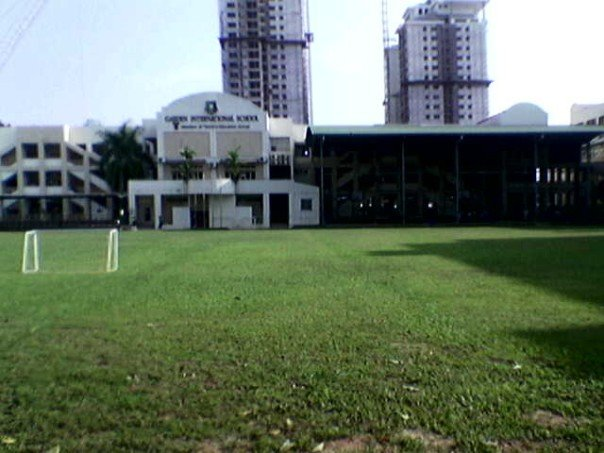
The Kuala Lumpur Campus in 2005

The school moved to Bukit Bintang, Kuala Lumpur in 1955 due to a rapidly expanding roll and, after several moves to locations around the Klang Valley, moved to the present location in Mont Kiara in 1996.

=== International examinations ===
In 1966, Garden School was selected as the first school in Malaysia for the University of London's General Certificate of Education examination. It is fully accredited to offer both IGCSE and A Level examinations. Candidates sit examinations in the May/June series of each academic year.

== Academic information ==
=== Early Years Centre ===
Garden International School's Early Years Centre (EYC) is a preschool following the English EYFS curriculum. The bespoke centre is located in the residential community of Desa Sri Hartamas and follows the EYFS curriculum. The EYC is divided into Nursery (age 3–4) and Reception (age 4–5) classes; a flexible 'Pre-Nursery' enrolment option is also available for children who join the term that they turn 3, providing they are toilet trained and show school readiness.

The Centre offers a Jungle School programme, unique in Malaysia, which offers the children regular opportunities to learn and build confidence in a safe outdoor environment.

=== Primary school ===
Garden International School's Primary School provides an international curriculum based on the National Curriculum for England and Wales. Science, History, Geography and PSHE (Personal, Social and Health Education) are taught by classroom teachers, alongside specialist teachers supporting the teaching of Art, Design and Technology, Music, ICT, Physical Education and Modern Foreign Languages.

=== Secondary school ===
GIS' Secondary School students follow a full range of courses leading to International General Certificate of Secondary Education (IGCSE) Examinations. The Key Stage 3 programme is based upon the English National Curriculum, with modifications to suit the school's context.

The school offers University of Cambridge International Examinations, with students sitting the majority of IGCSE examinations at the end of Year 11. At Sixth Form, the school offers AS & A-Level (both Cambridge International Examinations & Edexcel) courses. which are supplemented by bespoke subject electives and a summer professional internship programme, THRIVE.

In recent years, some subjects have chosen to take Edexcel in place of CIE, such as GCSE PE, A-Level Mathematics, Drama & Theatre Studies and Psychology.

In terms of academic performance, GIS' Secondary School is one of Asia's top performing international schools, with the majority of graduates going to the world's top 100 universities.

== Notable alumni ==
- Rebekah Yeoh – businesswoman and philanthropist
- Kira Narayanan – actress, anchor, musician and TV personality

== Academic accreditations and awards ==
- Apple Distinguished School
- Relocate Awards (Highly Commended)
- Global Innovative Learning Program Award by 21st Century Learning
- TES Independent School Awards 2016
- Primary Science Quality Mark (PSQM)
