= Jurong Island =

Island in Singapore

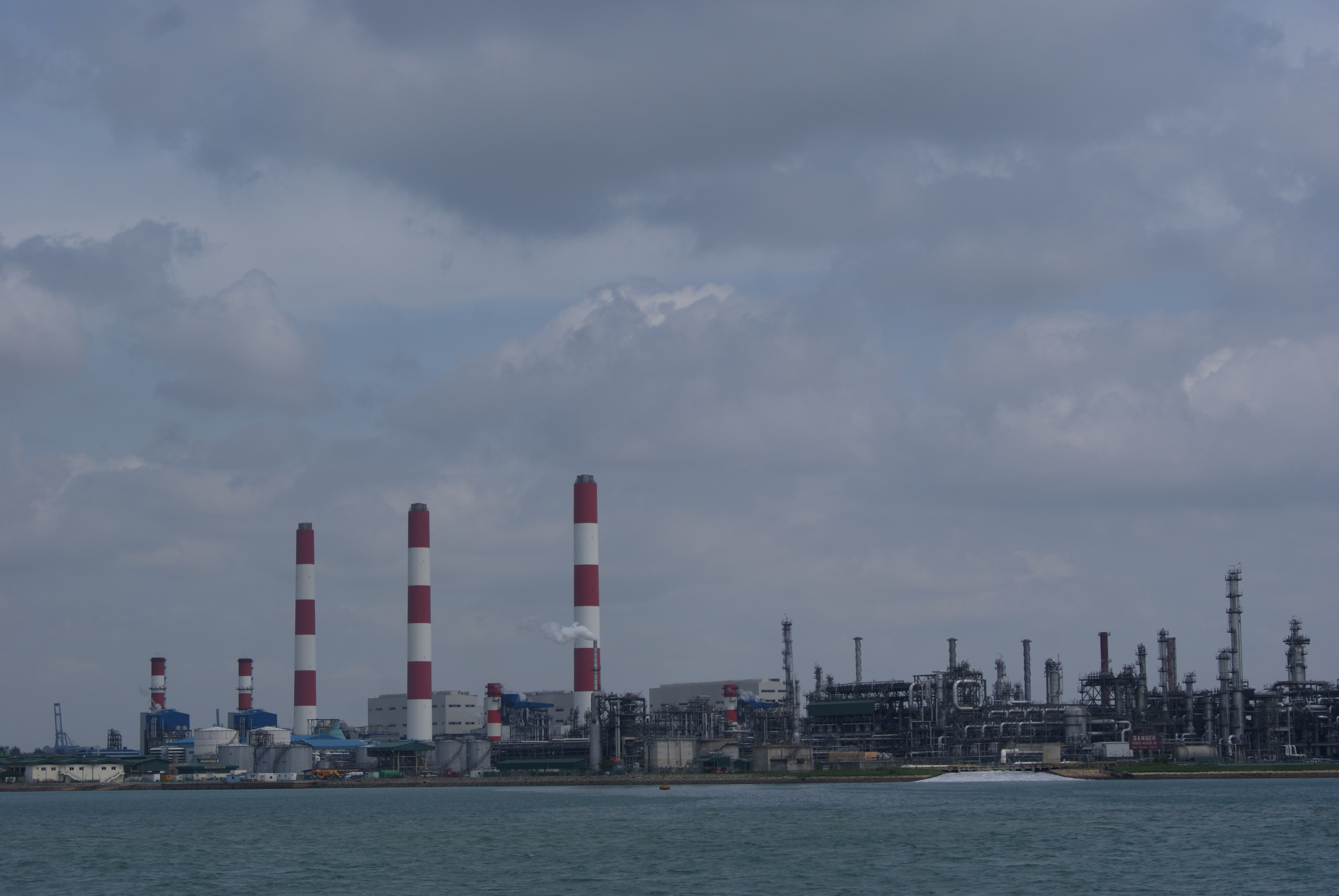
- Jurong Island, photographed in February 2011

- Location within Singapore
- Interactive map of Jurong Island

Geography
- Location: Southeast Asia
- Coordinates: 1.2701°N 103.6959°E
- Archipelago: Malay Archipelago
- Area: 35 km^{2} (14 sq mi)

Administration
- Singapore
- Region: West Region
- Planning Area: Western Islands
- CDC: South West CDC
- Town council: West Coast-Jurong West Town Council
- Constituency: West Coast-Jurong West GRC
- Member of Parliament: Cassandra Lee

Jurong Island is an island located to the southwest of the main island of Singapore. It was formed through the amalgamation of several offshore islands. This was achieved through Singapore's land reclamation efforts, which joined additional islets. Completed in 2009, nearly two decades ahead of schedule, the project expanded the land area from less than 1,000 hectares (2,471 acres) to approximately 3,500 hectares (8,600 acres). Access to the island has been restricted to authorised staff and visitors since 2001 due to its critical role in national infrastructure.

Singapore is a major oil refining hub. The island serves as the primary hub for Singapore's energy and chemicals sector, ranking as one of the top three oil refining centres in the world. Despite having no domestic crude oil, Singapore leverages this massive infrastructure to process over 1.5 million barrels (240 million litres) of oil per day. As such, Singapore has the world's largest bunkering port and possesses a refining capacity that significantly exceeds domestic consumption.

== History ==
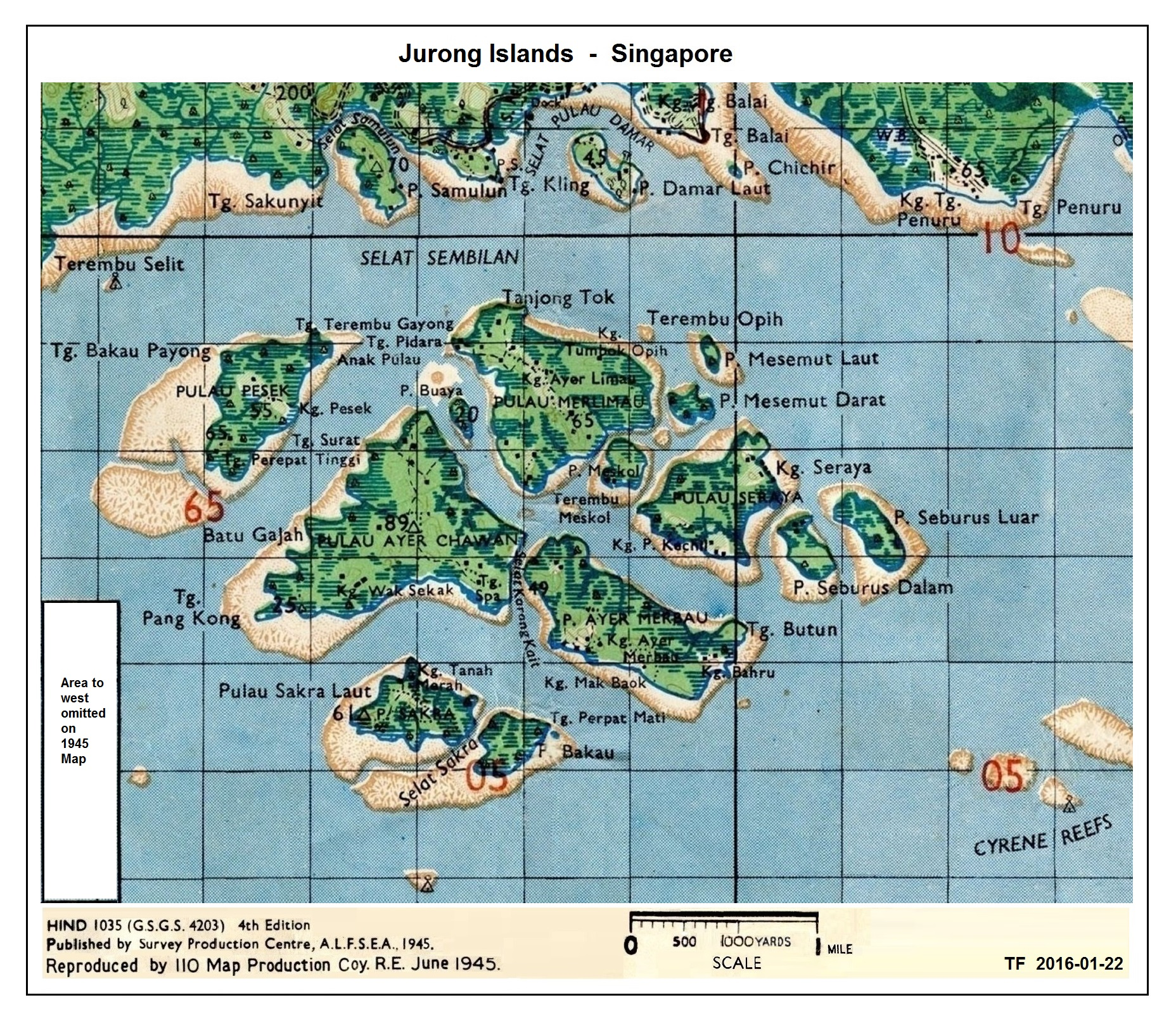
Extract from Singapore Map – 1945

The island was previously a stop on a maritime trade route. Jurong Island used to be a maze of island hideouts frequented by raiding pirates. Later in the early 19th century, entrepreneurs trading gambier altered the area for large scale settlement. In 1848 a British surveyor, John Turnbull Thomson, mentioned there were numerous Chinese and Malay villages in Jurong.

The outlying islands of Pulau Ayer Chawan, Pulau Ayer Merbau, Pulau Merlimau and Pulau Seraya hosted small fishing villages up to the 1960s. The villagers lived in Malay-style wooden stilt houses on the palm-fringed islands. Between the late 1960s and early 1970s, three big oil companies planned to house their facilities on Pulau Ayer Chawan for Esso, Pulau Merlimau for Singapore Refinery Company and Pulau Pesek for Mobil Oil.

The Government of Singapore then took the opportunity to grow the petrochemical industry to improve economic growth. It proved a success when the petroleum industry took off in the 1970s.

By the 1980s, after a decade of rapid industrialisation, industrial land was growing scarce on Singapore mainland. The idea of joining the southern islands off Jurong to form one colossal island to create more industrial land was therefore conceived. In 1991, JTC Corporation (formerly Jurong Town Corporation) was appointed the agent of the Jurong Island project. JTC planned and coordinated with various government agencies in providing the necessary infrastructure and services to the island.

Physical land reclamation began in 1995, and Jurong Island was officially opened on 14 October 2000 by then Prime Minister Goh Chok Tong. From the original seven islets comprising 991 hectares (2,450 acres), as of completion of land reclamation on 25 September 2009, Jurong Island has a total land area of over 3,500 hectares (8,600 acres). Penta-Ocean Construction was the major contractor and reclamation was completed 20 years ahead of schedule.

== Petrochemical industries ==
Today, Jurong Island is home to many companies such as Arkema, Arlanxeo, Afton Chemical, Air Liquide, Asahi Kasei, BASF, Celanese, Evonik, ExxonMobil, Infineum, DuPont, Mitsui Chemicals, Chevron Oronite, Linde, Mitsubishi Chemicals, SLNG, Royal Dutch Shell, Singapore Petroleum Company Singapore Refining Company, Stepan Company, Petrochemical Corporation of Singapore, The Polyolefin Company, Chevron Phillips, Mitsui Elastomer, Baker Hughes and Sumitomo Chemical.

Clusters of gigantic cylindrical tanks amid a maze of pipelines now dot the island; investment totalled S$31 billion in 2010. Resident companies produce a vast range of items, from petroleum products to polycarbonate resins used in CDs, DVDs and LCD TV panels, and super-absorbent polymers that go into diapers and sanitary napkins.

ExxonMobil, which has invested S$4 billion in a refinery and cracker plant, makes industrial and automotive lubricants including a product used in Formula One racing cars. DuPont has invested S$1 billion, and manufactures Zytel nylon resin, a versatile engineering plastic used in automobile components, appliances, wire insulation, sporting gear and home furnishings. Afton Chemical is constructing a new manufacturing facility, expected to become operational in January 2016, to produce petroleum additives for the Asia-Pacific and Middle East markets.

Output for the chemicals cluster – which cover oil and gas, petrochemicals and speciality chemicals – totalled S$66.5 billion in 2005, an increase of 31 per cent from 2004. This accounted for almost 32 per cent of production in Singapore's manufacturing sector. Powered by the cluster, Singapore is currently one of the world's top three oil refining centres despite not having a single drop of crude deposits.

Jurong Island's refineries process 1.5 million barrels (240 million litres) of crude oil per day, turning it into petrol, kerosene and jet fuel sold locally and abroad. Cracker plants break down the molecules of other oil-and gas-related substances such as naphtha into additives that give unique characteristics to certain products, from printer inks to plastic mouldings, semiconductors and aircraft materials..

Apart from imported crude, natural gas from Indonesia's West Natuna field arrives at Jurong Island via a 640-kilometre (400 mi) undersea pipeline. Some of it is refined to provide a source of fuel, while the rest is sent to crackers that make other petrochemical products. The country's first refilling station for compressed natural gas (CNG) opened on Jurong Island in 2002. As most of the more than 2500 cars running on CNG in Singapore are not allowed to enter the island because the drivers do not have the necessary security pass, four more CNG stations opened on the main island leading up to September 2009.

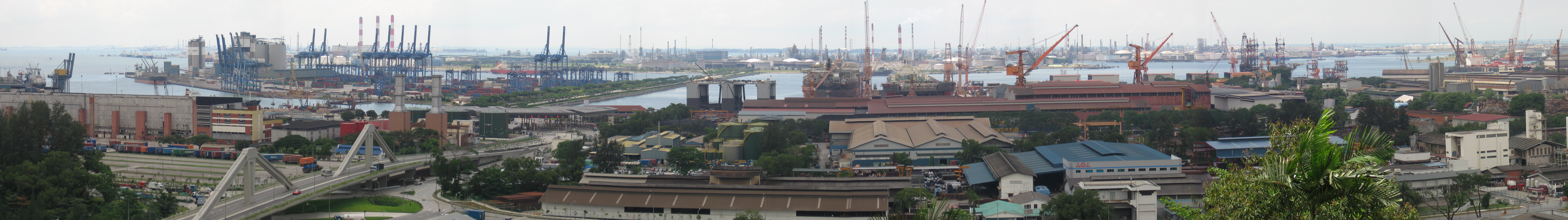
Jurong Island lies in the background of this panoramic view of Jurong Industrial Estate. The Jurong Pier Flyover and the island of Pulau Damar Laut, with Jurong Island Highway that leads to Jurong Island, can be seen on the left.

== Security ==
Jurong Island was gazetted as a Protected Place (PP) in October 2001 following the September 11 attacks in the United States. Access control is contracted to a private security company, while the Singapore Armed Forces (SAF) helps to protect the island. The Police Coast Guard (PCG) also conducts regular patrols around the island to ensure no unauthorised vessels are allowed access within a restricted area of waters surrounding it.

As such, access to the island is limited to authorised staff and visitors, and they are issued with security passes. Other security restrictions include that any photographic equipment brought to the island must be declared. Without permission from security, it is forbidden to take photographs or videos on Jurong Island. Anyone getting caught taking pictures or videos is handed over to the police, and subsequently will have their Jurong Island pass confiscated and their permission to enter Jurong Island revoked.

Jurong Island and the southwestern waters were to be used for Exercise Northstar 8 from 21 to 25 November 2011. However, Exercise Northstar 8 was only carried out on 25 November 2011 after 4 pm at Jurong Island, up to 7:30 pm.

== Infrastructure ==
Jurong Island has two fire stations, and an amenity centre known as Oasis@Sakra that houses a food court, a medical clinic and a free-of-charge multi-storey carpark. The island also houses the Pulau Seraya Power Station, Singapore's first offshore power station, which was built in phases on the former Pulau Seraya since 1986. A 200 MW, 285 MWh lithium iron phosphate grid battery started in early 2023.

The island has a network of pipelines that allows for seamless integration among companies. For example, Japan's Teijin can make polycarbonates from chlorine piped in directly from CIFE and bisphenol A from Mitsui Chemicals elsewhere on the island. Red pipes carry water for firefighting, and green pipes carry sea water for cooling. Huge silver pipes carry steam, and small silver pipes bring product lines. There are two major cargo jetties on Jurong Island, namely Sakra Jetty and Banyan Jetty. Sakra Jetty is managed and controlled by ExxonMobil.

== Jurong Rock Caverns ==
Construction work on Jurong Rock Caverns (JRC), Singapore's first underground rock caverns for storage of crude oil, condensates, naphtha and gas-oil, started on 8 February 2007. JTC Corporation was appointed by the Singapore government to undertake the construction of JRC.

Located beneath the seabed of Banyan Basin, off Jurong Island, JRC was completed in phases beginning in 2013, and was officially opened on 2 September 2014. As a result of this first phase of work, the caverns reportedly have a storage capacity of 1.47 million cubic metres (390 million US gallons). Phase 2, which has the potential to add another 1.32 million cubic metres (350 million US gallons), is being explored.

== See also ==
- Oil industry in Singapore

== General references ==
- Associated Press, "A GDP bigger than some nations'", Today, 21 November 2006
