= Seraya Energy =

Licensed electricity retailer in Singapore

Seraya Energy is a licensed electricity retailer serving the Singaporean electricity market. It is a subsidiary of YTL PowerSeraya Pte. Limited, one of the largest power generation companies in Singapore.

The company serves customers in a wide range of sectors including manufacturing, government, education, retail, and food and beverage. It also offers bundled utilities like steam and industrial water, and has introduced value-added services for its energy customers.

Seraya Energy is one of the leading electricity retailers in terms of market share serving the Singaporean electricity market.
