= Ranhill Utilities =

Malaysian conglomerate

Ranhill Utilities Berhad
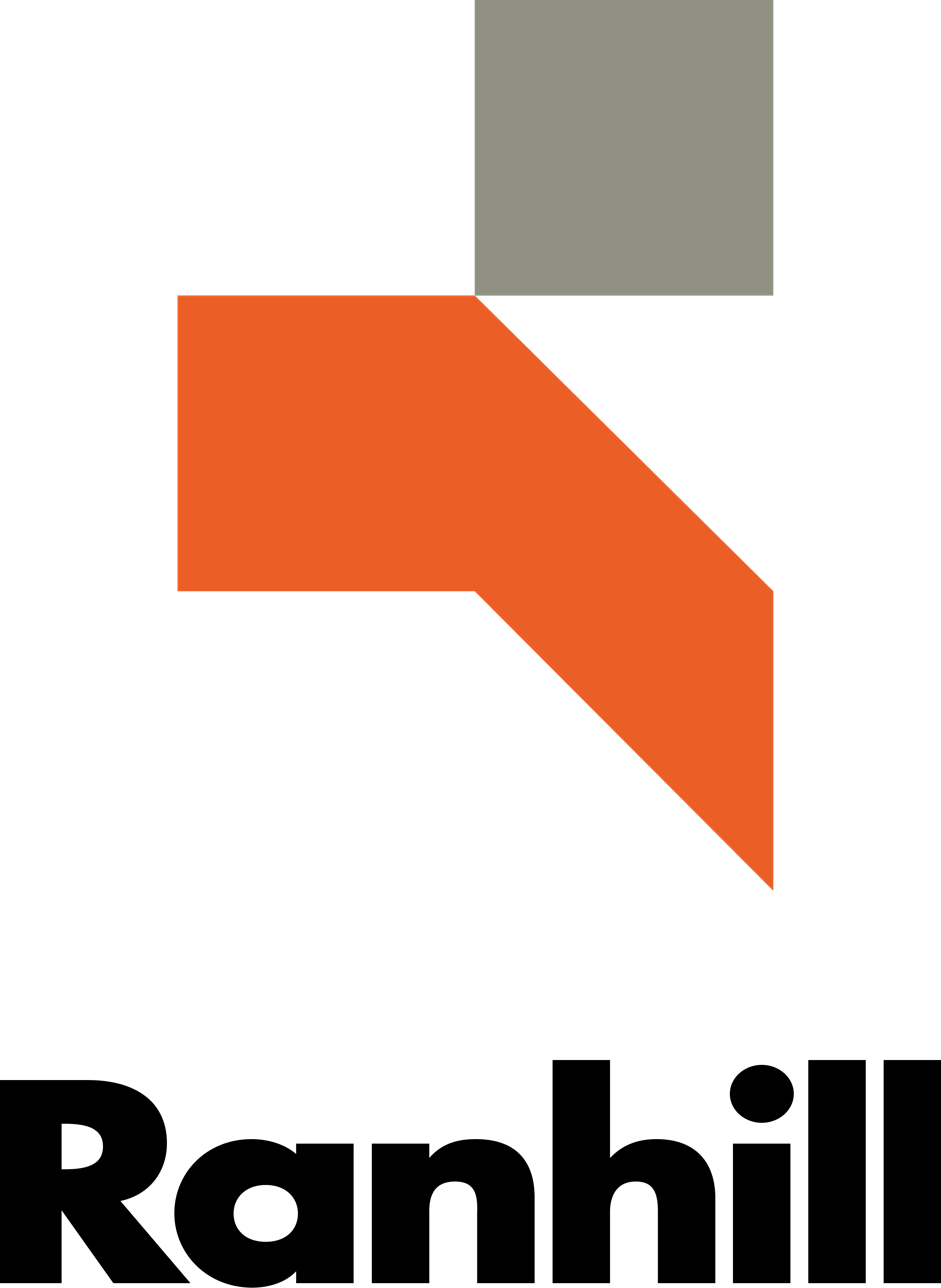
- Type: Public limited company
- Traded as: MYX: 5272
- ISIN: MYL5272OO009
- Industry: Environment; Power
- Predecessor: Symphony House Berhad
- Founded: 1955
- Headquarters: Bangunan Ranhill SAJ, Jalan Garuda, Larkin, 80350 Johor Bahru, Malaysia
- Key people: Hamdan Mohamad, President and Chief Executive
- Revenue: ▲MYR 628.2 mil (June, 2015)
- Number of employees: 3,902
- Website: www.ranhill.com.my

Ranhill Utilities Berhad (MYX: 5272) is a Malaysian conglomerate with interests in environment and power sectors. In the environment sector, it provides water supply services, operates water and wastewater treatment plants, and provides specialised services in the management and optimisation of water utility assets. In the power sector, it develops, owns and operates power generation assets. Its operations and services are primarily in Malaysia, and its international operations are centered in Asian markets such as China, Thailand and Southeast Asia.

In the environment business, Ranhill has been granted an exclusive license by the Minister of Energy, Green Technology and Water, Malaysia to provide source-to-tap water supply services to end-customers in the entire State of Johor, the second most populous state in Malaysia, with a population of approximately 3.5 million people. Outside Malaysia, it operates water concession assets on a BOT, BTO and TOT basis in China which consist of 8 wastewater treatment plants with capacities ranging from 5.0 MLD to 80.0 MLD and a 30.0 MLD reclamation plant. In Thailand, Ranhill has 4 potable water treatment plants with capacities ranging from 10.5 MLD to 15.0 MLD, 4 wastewater treatment plants with capacities ranging from 1.5 MLD to 24.0 MLD and a 10.0 MLD reclamation plants. In addition, through its joint venture, Yichun Pinang, Ranhill also operates a potable water treatment plant in Yichun City, China with a treatment capacity of 50.0 MLD.

In the power business, Ranhill owns and operates two 190 MW CCGT power plants in Sabah, Malaysia via its subsidiaries, RPI and RPII, on a BOO and BOT basis, generating 380 MW of electricity for a 21-year period, commencing on 25 October 2008 and on 22 April 2011 with respect to RPII. It provides O&M services to its RPI and RPII power plants through RPOM and RPOMII, respectively.

== History and milestones ==
Ranhill Utilities Berhad ventured into the environment and power business stems largely from the history of Ranhill Bersekutu Sdn Bhd (“RBSB”), which was initially established by Rankine & Hill under the name of Ranhill Bersekutu Partnership to provide a full range of mechanical and electrical engineering design services. Subsequently, in 1981, RBSB was incorporated as a private limited company in Malaysia under its current name. Building on its engineering strength across various disciplines including water supply system, Tan Sri Hamdan, then the chief executive officer of RBSB, subsequently ventured into the power business through RGSB and into the environment business through RUSB. All of the companies within Ranhill's Group were part of the RB Group prior to the internal reorganisation and part of the RERB Group after the completion of the internal reorganisation II and prior to the pre-offering reorganisation.

=== Environment ===
Ranhill conducts its environment business through RSAJ, RWSB and RWT (Cayman), which were all part of RUSB prior to the Pre-Offering Reorganisation.

RUSB was incorporated in Malaysia under the Act in June 2000 as a public limited company under the name of Insan Utiliti Berhad and assumed the name of Ranhill Utilities Berhad in January 2002. The incorporation of Ranhill Utilities Berhad was primarily to facilitate SAJH's listing on the Main Board of Kuala Lumpur Stock Exchange (now known as Main Market of Bursa Securities). SAJH was formed to carry out the water supply services in Johor for 30 years commencing from 1 March 2000. Pursuant to its delisting on 28 August 2008, Ranhill Utilities Berhad subsequently assumed the name of RUSB on 2 July 2009.

Pursuant to a vesting order made in 1994 by the Menteri Besar Johor under the Water Supply Enactment 1993, all assets, rights, liabilities and staff of the State Government of Johor with respect to the water supply services were transferred to and vested in SAJSB, a company owned by the State Government of Johor. The water supply services business in Johor was subsequently privatised to SAJH as part of the State Government of Johor's effort to further improve the operation and service level of water supply in Johor. In April 1999, SAJH, together with LOSB, entered into a concession agreement with the State Government of Johor and SAJSB to provide water supply services to the entire State of Johor.

On 1 September 2009, SAJH migrated to the licensing regime under the Water Services Industry Act, and the concession agreement was terminated upon SAJH's migration to the new licensing regime.

In February 2005, RUSB acquired a 70% equity stake in RWT, which enabled the company to expand into wastewater and sewerage technology business, particularly in the areas of potable water treatment, wastewater and sewerage treatment as well as process water systems. At the point of acquisition, RWT had a track record of completing water and wastewater treatment projects throughout Asia, notably Malaysia, Thailand and China. Subsequently, in 2008, RUSB formed RWT (Cayman) through a joint-venture arrangement with Robinson, a unit of Aqua Resources Fund Limited, through which various water concessions in China previously held under RUSB Group were subsequently held under RWT (Cayman) pursuant to an internal reorganisation. In order to enhance Ranhill's position as well as reap higher benefits from its potential ventures in China, in June 2014, Ranhill entered into a conditional sale and purchase agreement with RUSB (in conjunction with the Acquisition of RUSB Companies as described in Section 6.1.4 of this Prospectus) for the post-Offering acquisition of the remaining 47.9% equity interest in RWT (Cayman) that Ranhill does not currently own. This acquisition will allow Ranhill to hold 100% equity interest in RWT (Cayman) after the completion of the Offering.

In February 2005, RUSB established RWSB to offer specialised operational support and services to water companies in the management and optimisation of water utility assets.

=== Power ===
Ranhill conducts its power business through RPI, RPII, RPOM, RPOMII and RPS, which were all part of RGSB prior to the Pre-Offering Reorganisation.

RGSB was incorporated in Malaysia under the Act in June 1972 as a private limited company under the name of EPE Power Corporation Berhad. Through its 60%-owned subsidiary RPI, RGSB operated a 120 MW electricity capacity open-cycle gas turbine power plant at Teluk Salut, Kota Kinabalu, Sabah pursuant to a power purchase agreement dated February 1997 entered into with Lembaga Letrik Sabah (now known as Sabah Electricity). The plant commenced initial operations in August 1998 and its COD as a 120 MW open-cycle power plant was February 1999. On 25 February 2004, RB became a shareholder of RGSB pursuant to the disposal of Powertron Resources Sdn Bhd to RGSB. RPI's power plant was subsequently upgraded to a total generating capacity of 190 MW using a CCGT configuration, and it commenced full combined-cycle operations on 25 October 2008.

On 24 January 2006, the Economic Planning Unit of the Prime Minister's Department awarded Ranhill Tuaran Sdn Bhd (now known as RPII), an 80%-owned subsidiary of RGSB, with a concession on a BOT basis for a 190 MW CCGT power plant in Sabah. The RPII power plant's initial COD in a single gas turbine open-cycle 65 MW configuration was 6 March 2010 and its COD as a two gas turbine 130 MW open-cycle facility was 9 July 2010. The RPII power plant commenced full 190 MW combined-cycle operations on 22 April 2011.

Ranhill conducts routine maintenance on both the RPI and RPII power plants through its subsidiaries RPOM and RPOMII. Ranhill owns a 60% equity interest in RPOM, which provides O&M services to the RPI power plant, and also own an 80% equity interest in RPOMII, which provides O&M services to the RPII power plant.

The remaining equity interests in RPI, RPII, RPOM and RPOMII are owned by SECSB.

Other than that, Ranhill owns 100% equity interest in RPS. RPS will provide administrative support services to our subsidiaries in the power business.

Certain key milestones for Ranhill group are as follows:

Year	Key milestones
1998	RPI's 120 MW open-cycle power plant commenced initial operations in its original open-cycle configuration.
1999	SAJH entered into a concession agreement with LOSB, the State Government of Johor and SAJSB to provide water supply services to the entire State of Johor.
2005	RWT entered into BOT arrangements for a 10.5 MLD potable water treatment plant, a 9.6 MLD wastewater treatment plant and an 8.0 MLD reclamation plant, each covering a period of 20 years in Amata Nakorn Industrial Park in Thailand and a 50.0 MLD potable water treatment plant for 29 years in Yichun, Jiangxi, China. RWSB was established in 2005 to commence provision of NRW management services.
2008	The capacity of RPI power plant increased to 190 MW pursuant to the commencement of its combined-cycle operations.
2009	SAJH terminated its concession agreement with the State Government of Johor and migrated to the licensing regime under the Water Services Industry Act.
2011	RPII's 190 MW CCGT power plant commenced operations, making RGSB the largest IPP in Sabah in terms of total installed capacity.
2012	RUSB Group entered into several MOUs and/or investment agreements to carry out investment evaluation and feasibility studies on several water and wastewater treatment projects in China.
2013	RWT (Cayman) Group entered into BOT arrangements for a 20.0 MLD wastewater treatment plant in Chang Feng Xia Tang Heavy Industrial Park, Anhui Province, China for 30 years, a 5.0 MLD wastewater treatment plant in Yihuang Industrial Park, Jiangxi Province, China for 29 years and a 5.0 MLD wastewater treatment plant in Wanzai Industrial Park, Jiangxi Province, China for 29 years and a 10.0 MLD wastewater treatment plant in Amata City Industrial Park, Thailand for 30 years.
2015	RWT (Cayman) Group entered into a BOT arrangement for a 10.0 MLD wastewater treatment plant in Chongren Industrial Park, Jiangxi Province, China for 29 years.

== Technology ==
=== Power business ===
The generation process uses mechanical energy to rotate the power generator turbines.

=== Environment business ===
For water business, there are several methods and technologies that are available and are used worldwide for treating raw water into drinking quality or industrial wastewater.

In addition, AquaSMART system is a web-based application system developed as an operational tool and has become an integral component of the NRW reduction strategy. This system is an internal NRW resource developed in-house to provide effective monitoring and decision support for the NRW business. This effective monitoring and decision support helps the NRW business to meet its targets and allocate its resources effectively and efficiently, thereby creating a competitive advantage for the NRW business. This system performs as a data storage management system for data capture, input, handling and monitoring of DMA's field data for the any given project.

The AquaSMART system links all of the DMA's raw data collected (from any software) and creates reports at the click of a button. It is a simple and useful tool for DMA monitoring, either for a long term or on a daily basis, which would save data analyst a significant amount of time.

The NRW business does not sell AquaSMART as a standalone product. As a result, no revenue or income is generated directly from AquaSMART. Rather, the NRW business utilises AquaSMART as an internal monitoring and decision-making resource that helps RWSB to achieve client targets and optimise its costs.
