= YTL Corporation =

Malaysian infrastructure conglomerate

YTL Corporation Berhad
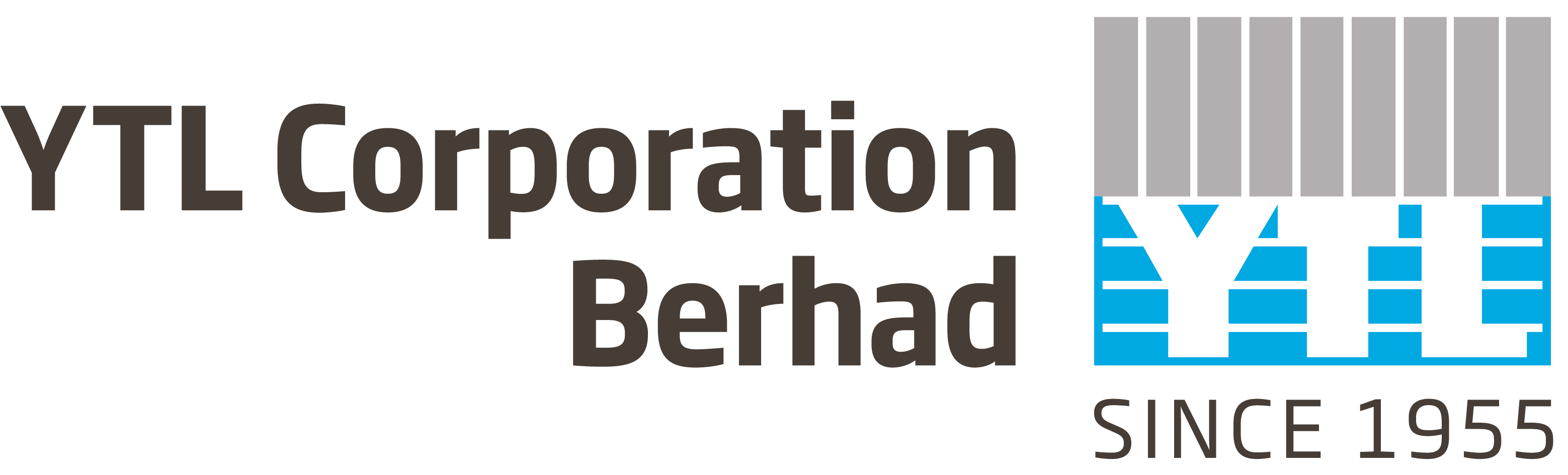
- Type: Public
- Traded as: MYX: 4677 and TYO: 1773
- ISIN: MYL4677OO000
- Industry: Conglomerate
- Founded: 1955; 71 years ago
- Founder: Yeoh Tiong Lay
- Headquarters: Kuala Lumpur, Malaysia.
- Area served: 11 countries and territories: Malaysia; Singapore; Thailand; Indonesia; United Kingdom; France; Australia; Japan; Jordan; China; United Arab Emirates
- Key people: Francis Yeoh Sock Ping (Chairman); Yeoh Seok Kian (MD)
- Revenue: ▲RM 29.62 billion (2023)
- Net income: ▲RM 2.12 billion (2023)
- Total assets: ▲RM 81.46 billion (2023)
- Number of employees: 12,627
- Subsidiaries: YTL Power; YTL Communications; Express Rail Link
- Website: www.ytl.com

YTL Corporation (full name YTL Corporation Berhad) is a Malaysian multinational company focused on building infrastructure, primarily power generation, water, and sewerage services. Founded by Yeoh Tiong Lay in 1955 it is listed on the Bursa Malaysia (Kuala Lumpur Stock Exchange), the FTSE Bursa Malaysia KLCI, the MSCI Malaysia Index, and the Prime Market Foreign Stocks Segment of the Tokyo Stock Exchange, where it made history in 1996 as the first non-Japanese Asian company to be listed there.

In June 2024 YTL's total financial capital was approximately RM100 billion.

== Subsidiaries ==
YTL operates in various sectors through its subsidiaries, predominantly in building major infrastructure for power generation, water, and sewerage services. Other activities include cement manufacturing, property development, hotel and resort management, telecommunications, digital banking, data centres and cloud computing, artificial intelligence, and education. Utilities constitute the largest portion of the company's revenue at 71%, followed by cement manufacturing at 16%, construction and hotel operations each at 4%, with the remaining revenue distributed among other sectors. In June 2024 YTL's total financial capital was approximately RM100 billion.

Subsidiary	Business
YTL Power International	Utility, cloud computing
YTL Cement	Construction material
YTL Construction	Construction
YTL Land and Development	Property development
YTL Hospitality REIT	Hospitality
YTL Communications	Telecommunication
Express Rail Link	Transportation

== Operations ==
=== Malaysia ===
YTL's core operations are concentrated in Malaysia, with YTL Power International a major player in the country's power generation and water sectors, operating 1,212 megawatts combined cycle power plants at Paka, Terengganu, and Pasir Gudang, Johor. YTL Communications provides telecommunication services under the YES brand. YTL Construction has undertaken large-scale infrastructure projects across the country, including power plants, airports, hospitals, railway lines, and commercial and residential buildings. With a significant land bank, YTL Land is responsible for property development of townships like Sentul in Kuala Lumpur. YTL Hospitality REIT manages and develops a portfolio of renowned hospitality properties such as Pangkor Laut Resort and The Ritz-Carlton, Kuala Lumpur. Express Rail Link operates the KLIA Ekspres and KLIA Transit high-speed rail services connecting Kuala Lumpur International Airport (KLIA) with Kuala Lumpur Sentral.

YTL Data Center Holdings, a subsidiary of YTL Power, operates data centres in Sentul, Kuala Lumpur, and Kulai, Johor. The Green Data Center Park in Kulai hosts Nvidia's cloud computing supercomputers, which focus on artificial intelligence applications.

In May 2024 YTL Power became a substantial shareholder in Ranhill Utilities, a utility company that operates a water treatment plant in Johor and a power generation plant in Sabah.

=== Singapore ===
YTL Power owns and operates YTL PowerSeraya in Singapore, a company involved in multi-utility operations and with a total licensed generation capacity of 3,100 megawatts.

YTL Corp also has a significant stake in Starhill Global REIT, a Singapore-based Real Estate Investment Trust (REIT) that invests in prime retail and office properties across Singapore, Malaysia, Japan, China, and Australia.

In July 2024 YTL announced an expansion into the industrialised building systems sector through YTL Cement Bhd, which planned to acquire a significant stake in Singapore-based NSL Ltd.

=== United Kingdom ===
YTL has a presence in the United Kingdom through Wessex Water, a water and sewerage provider serving 2.9 million customers.

YTL Developments UK Limited is another UK venture, and is involved in the development of Brabazon, a mixed-use property project on the historic Filton Airfield site in Bristol.

=== Other Countries ===
YTL Power has investments in power generation companies PT Jawa Power and PT Jawa Timur in Indonesia, and Attarat Power in Jordan.

== Recent developments ==
=== Data centre expansion ===
In April 2026 YTL Power International announced plans to accelerate the expansion of its Green Data Centre Park in Kulai, Johor, aiming for a doubling of its capacity within three years from the initially planned 500 megawatts. The company had secured commitments for up to 300 megawatts at the time of the announcement. To fund the expansion, YTL Power indicated it was considering a separate listing of its data centre unit, as well as bond or sukuk issuances.

=== Controlling stake in Cepco ===
In April 2026 YTL Cement Bhd acquired a 53.49% controlling equity interest in Concrete Engineering Products Bhd (Cepco), a manufacturer of prestressed spun concrete piles and poles listed on the main market of Bursa Malaysia. YTL's acquisition of Cepco for RM103.8 million at RM2.60 per share triggered a mandatory general offer for all remaining Cepco shares under the Capital Markets and Services Act. The offer price represented a premium of 39% on Cepco's last closing price prior to the announcement, and a premium of 96.2% on its one-year volume-weighted average price. YTL Cement stated its intention to maintain Cepco's listing status on Bursa Malaysia.
