= Francis Yeoh =

Malaysian businessman

Yang Berbahagia Tan Sri Dato' Indera Francis Yeoh Sock Ping PSM SIMP KBE DPMP DPMS JMN CBE FICE
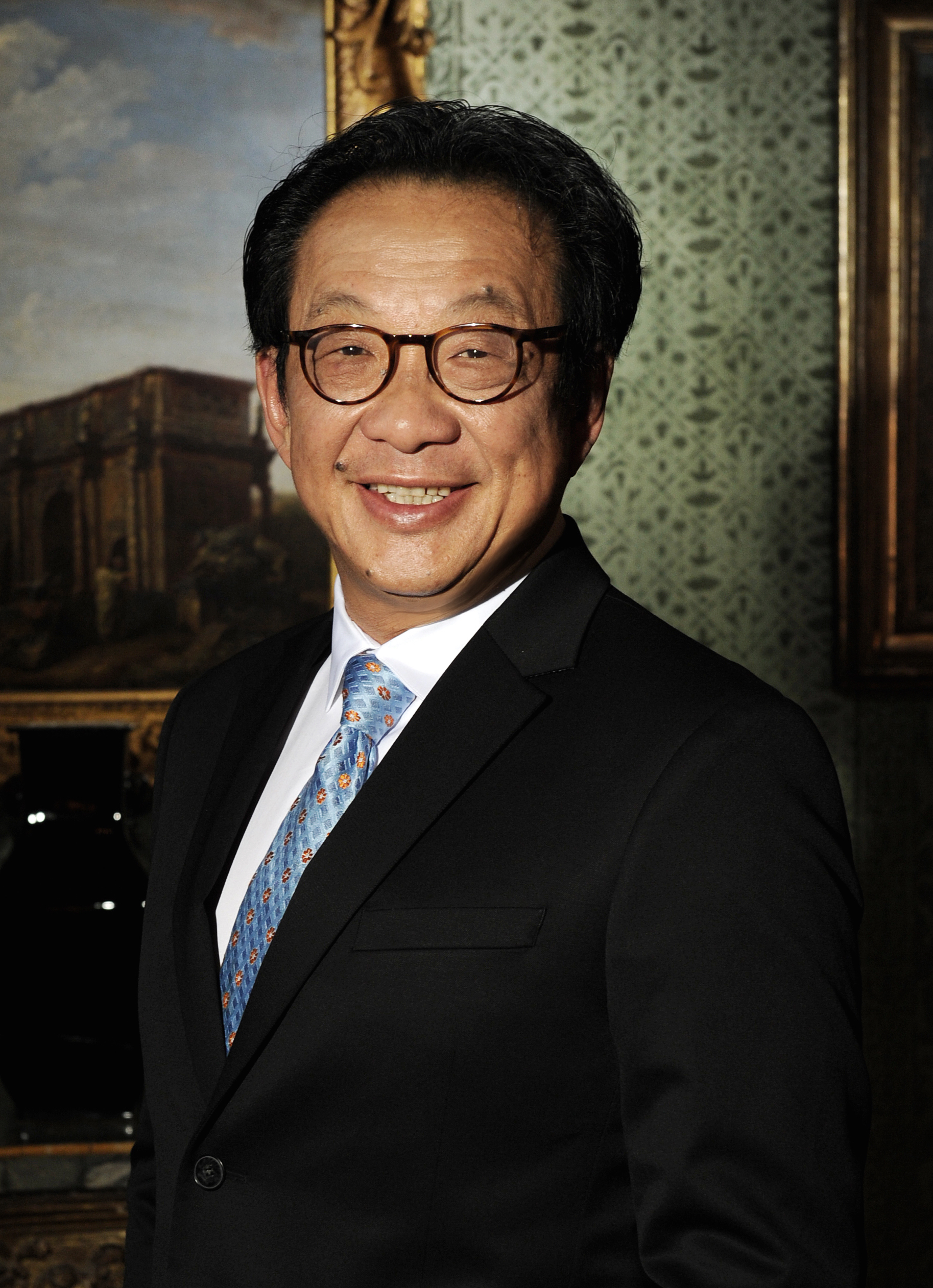
- Yeoh in 2015
- Born: 23 August 1954 (age 72); Kuala Selangor, Malaysia
- Occupation: Businessman
- Title: Executive Chairman of YTL Corporation (2018–present)
- Spouse: Rosaline Yeoh (1982)

Francis Yeoh

Chinese name
- Traditional Chinese: 楊肅斌
- Simplified Chinese: 杨肃斌
- Jyutping: Joeng4 Suk1 Ban1
- Hokkien POJ: Iôⁿ Siok-pin
- Tâi-lô: Iônn Siok-pin

Francis Yeoh Sock Ping (Chinese: 楊肅斌; born 23 August 1954) is a Malaysian businessman, and the eldest son of the late Malaysian billionaire Yeoh Tiong Lay. He was appointed a managing director of YTL Corporation in 1988. He helped grow YTL Corporation into a multi-disciplinary conglomerate comprising five listed entities. YTL Corporation Berhad, YTL Power International Berhad, YTL Hospitality REIT, Malayan Cement Berhad and Starhill Global REIT have a combined Market Capitalisation of approximately RM100 billion (USD21 billion) and total assets of RM84 billion (USD18 billion). YTL Group owns and manages regulated utilities, real estate and infrastructure assets. In 2022, he was ranked by Forbes as the 17th richest person in Malaysia.

== Recognitions ==
Yeoh was appointed an Honorary Commander of the Most Excellent Order of the British Empire (CBE) by Queen Elizabeth II in 2006 and was promoted to a Honorary Knight Commander (KBE) in 2019. In 2018, he was bestowed the Order of the Rising Sun, Gold Rays with Rosette by Emperor Akihito, and in the same year the Italian government conferred upon him the honour of Grand Officer of the Order of the Star of Italy.

== Education ==
He holds an Honorary Doctorate of Engineering, as well as a Bachelor of Science in Civil Engineering from the University of Kingston (UK). He also has an Honorary Degree of Doctor of Laws from University of Nottingham.

== Personal life ==
He has often attributed his success in business to Jesus.

Yeoh married Puan Sri Datin Paduka Rosaline Yeoh in 1982 and remained with her until her death in 2007; together, they have five children. His siblings reside in Malaysia and are fellow directors of YTL Corporation.

== Honours ==
=== Honours of Malaysia ===
- Malaysia
  - Commander of the Order of Loyalty to the Crown of Malaysia (PSM) - Tan Sri (1997)
- Pahang
  - Grand Knight of the Order of the Crown of Pahang (SIMP) - Dato' Indera (2018)
- Perak
  - Knight Commander of the Order of the Perak State Crown (DPMP) - Dato' (1989)
- Selangor
  - Knight Commander of the Order of the Crown of Selangor (DPMS) - Dato' (1996)

=== Foreign honours ===
- Italy
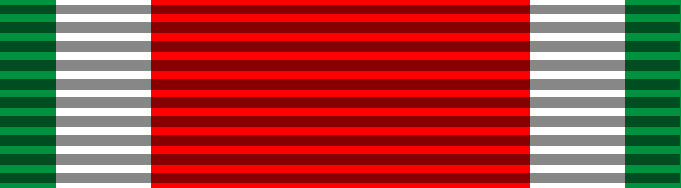
  - Grand Officer of the Order of the Star of Italy (2018)
- Japan
  - 4th Class, Gold Rays with Rosette of the Order of the Rising Sun (2018)
- United Kingdom
  - Honorary Commander of the Most Excellent Order of the British Empire (CBE) (2006)
  - Honorary Knight Commander of the Most Excellent Order of the British Empire (KBE) (2019)
