= DRB-HICOM =

Malaysian automotive company

DRB-HICOM Berhad
- Formerly: Diversified Resources Berhad
- Type: Public
- Traded as: MYX: 1619
- ISIN: MYL1619OO005
- Industry: Conglomerate
- Predecessor: The New Serendah Rubber Company Limited (1910–1980); The Heavy Industries Corporation of Malaysia Berhad (1980–1996); Diversified Resources Berhad (1996)
- Founded: 1996; 30 years ago
- Founder: Yahaya Ahmad
- Headquarters: Shah Alam, Selangor, Malaysia
- Area served: Southeast Asia
- Key people: Wan Zulkiflee Wan Ariffin (chairman); Syed Faisal Albar Syed Ali Rethza Albar (Group Managing Director); Aminah Othman (group CFO); Jezilee Mohamad Ramli (Chief Operating Officer, Corporate Services); Azri Zaharuddin (Chief Operating Officer – Properties, Corporate Planning & Strategy)
- Revenue: ▼RM12.65 billion (2021)
- Total assets: ▼RM41.68 billion (2019)
- Number of employees: Approx. 47,000
- Subsidiaries: Proton Holdings; Pos Malaysia; Bank Muamalat Malaysia
- Website: www.drb-hicom.com

DRB-HICOM Berhad is a Malaysian automotive company, involved in the automotive manufacturing, assembly and distribution industry. DRB-HICOM is the majority shareholder of Malaysia's national car company, Proton, with China's Zhejiang Geely Holding Group the other shareholder since an equity sale in 2017. The Group also owns national motorcycle company Modenas, with Japanese two-wheeler giant Kawasaki as its partner. DRB-HICOM assembles cars in Malaysia for Tata Motors, Honda, Isuzu, Mercedes-Benz and Volkswagen, with plans for expansion. The Group also retails various brands such Audi (via Euromobil Sdn Bhd), Mitsubishi (via EON Auto Mart Sdn Bhd) and Volkswagen (via HICOM Auto Sdn Bhd).

Besides automotive concerns, DRB-HICOM's core business focuses are in the services (postal, banking, vehicle inspections) and property & infrastructure sectors. These are conducted via several companies such as Pos Malaysia, Bank Muamalat, and Puspakom. It is also the owner of two education institutions, namely DRB-HICOM University of Automotive Malaysia and Akademi Saga in Pekan, Pahang. The latter is a vocational training centre that produces trained mechanics.

The Group also has a significant presence in the defence industry. Through DRB-HICOM Defence Technologies, it designs, develops, manufactures and supplies armoured and logistics vehicles for military and homeland security use. It supplies mainly to the Government of Malaysia.

== History ==
HICOM was originally incorporated on 11 March 1910 under The Companies Enactment 1897 as The New Serendah Rubber Company Limited. The name of the company was changed to The New Serendah Rubber Company Berhad on 15 April 1966. Subsequently, on 16 December 1993, it changed its name to HICOM Holdings Berhad pursuant to a restructuring exercise. It was incorporated in 1980 as the Heavy Industries Corporation of Malaysia Berhad (HICOM).

Diversified Resources Berhad (DRB) was incorporated in 1990 as Peerless Assets Sdn Bhd. It was changed to DRB in September 1991, and listed itself on Malaysia's main bourse in September the following year.

In 1996, both companies merged to form the largest conglomerate in Malaysia. DRB-HICOM was listed on the Main Board of the KLSE on 4 September 1992 and assumed its present name on 11 May 2000.

Within the manufacturing capabilities of DRB-HICOM is CTRM, a specialist composites products manufacturer, and counts Airbus, Boeing and Learjet as their aviation customers. The plant in Melaka houses 12 autoclaves, the largest number of autoclaves in a facility in ASEAN.

On 8 March 2018, the Group announced a major shift in the direction of their property sector. In a cash plus land swap deal with companies owned by their majority shareholder, DRB-HICOM announced the sale of several plots of land and all its hospitality assets. This shift will see DRB-HICOM exiting the hospitality industry with the sale of Glenmarie Golf & Country Club, Holiday Inn Glenmarie KL and Vivanta by Taj at Rebak Island Marina. This transaction was completed on 31 December 2020.

Five months later, on 1 August 2018, DRB-HICOM announced the sale of their waste management company Alam Flora Sdn Bhd (AFSB) to Malakoff Corporation Berhad. Included in the deal valued at RM1.0b was DRB-HICOM Environmental Services Sdn Bhd (DHES), a unit of AFSB. After several extensions of time, the deal was finally completed on 5 December 2019.

== Significant companies under DRB-HICOM ==
=== Subsidiaries ===
- PROTON Holdings Berhad – DRB-HICOM is a majority shareholder of PROTON, with Zhejiang Geely Holding Group Limited owning 49.9% equity in the national car company.
- Pos Malaysia Berhad – Malaysia's national post services provider. Pos Malaysia is listed on Bursa Malaysia.
- Bank Muamalat Malaysia - Bank Muamalat is an Islamic bank that offers a variety of products that are compliant with Shariah law.
- CTRM - a Batu Berendam, Melaka-based composites specialist that supplies to the global aviation industry.
- Motosikal Dan Enjin Nasional Sdn Bhd (Modenas) equity of 81% – Motorcycle manufacture and related components.
- HICOM Automotive Manufacturers Malaysia Sdn Bhd (formerly known as Automotive Manufacturers (Malaysia) Sdn Bhd) - Assembly of Volkswagen passenger vehicles.
- Deftech – Defence vehicles manufacturer based in Pekan, Pahang.
- Edaran Otomobil Nasional (EON) - a multi-brand dealer of vehicles, covering PROTON, Audi (Euromobil Sdn Bhd), Volkswagen (HICOM Auto Sdn Bhd, Mitsubishi (EON Automart Sdn Bhd)
- Automotive Corporation Malaysia Sdn Bhd (ACM) () – Authorised dealer for Isuzu Malaysia Sdn Bhd.
- DRB-HICOM Auto Solutions Sdn Bhd
- HICOM Diecastings Sdn Bhd - Casting and Machining company incorporated in 1985.
- Puspakom Sdn Bhd – Vehicle inspection centre.
- DRB-HICOM University of Automotive Malaysia
- PHN Industry Sdn Bhd - An automotive component manufacturing group of companies which consist of PHN Industry Sdn Bhd and its subsidiaries Oriental Summit Industries (OSI) Sdn Bhd and DRB-HICOM Mechatronics Sdn Bhd (DHMSB).
- HICOM-TECK SEE Manufacturing (Malaysia) Sdn Bhd – Equity of 51%. Manufacturer of automotive plastics components.

=== Associated companies ===
- Honda (Malaysia) Sdn Bhd – equity of 34%
- Mitsubishi Motors Malaysia Sdn Bhd – Equity of 48%.
- Isuzu HICOM Malaysia - Assembly of lights/heavy duty trucks, bus and passenger cars. Equity of 49%.
- Isuzu Malaysia Sdn Bhd – Equity of 49%.
- Suzuki Malaysia Automobile Sdn Bhd – Equity of 40%
- Suzuki Motorcycle Malaysia Sdn Bhd – Motorcycle engines & components
- HICOM-Yamaha Manufacturing (Malaysia) Sdn Bhd – Equity of 45%. Manufacturer of Yamaha motorcycle engines and components. Incorporated 1983.
- Pos Logistics Berhad – Logistics, Warehousing, Distribution, Automotive, Freight Forwarding & Haulage Services. Equity of 61.6%.

== See also ==
- DRB-Hicom F.C.
