= HICOM Automotive Manufacturers =

Car manufacturer

HICOM Automotive Manufacturers (Malaysia) Sdn. Bhd. (HA) is a subsidiary of DRB-HICOM. company for production and assembly of automobiles. The company's headquarters is located in Pekan, Malaysia. Previously, the company was also known as Automotive Manufacturers (Malaysia) Sdn. Bhd.

== History ==
The companies roots extend back to 1983 and originally consisted of the assembly in the Integrated Complex settled factory covering an area of 541,070 m^{2}. Since the opening of the plant, 13,000 vehicles per year produced in-house and more than 47,000 complete knock down kits are assembled for the local and surrounding markets.

Previously, the company assembled some of Proton models like Saga (Iswara), Satria, Putra, Tiara and Juara at 1990's prior to 2005.

The main products of the company are the Suzuki Swift and the Iveco Maxi. But its also produces trucks such as Freightliner and Fuso. Furthermore, in the main work force since 2010 is also the bus chassis of Daewoo.

In early 2005, assembly of the Mercedes-Benz C-Class and E-Class models commenced in Pekan. Prior to the 2005 model year, Malaysian-market Mercedes-Benz CKD models were assembled in the Oriental Assemblers Sdn. Bhd. (OASB) plant in Johor Bahru. In 2006, the Mercedes-Benz S-Class was added to the line-up.

On 13 August 2010, Volkswagen Group announced another joint venture. It is currently under the Growth Strategy 2018 and includes a production plant for passenger cars of the brand Volkswagen. Construction will take approximately 15 to 18 months, so the new plant is to open in 2012. The first cars here are the Mk5 Polo, B7 Passat and the A6 Jetta A6. Now they produce 12,000 per year. Total annually will be up to 80 cars per day units assembled in Malaysia. The design of VW's strategy also looks at making the cheapest car in the world that could be here in the Malaysian plant to be possibly produced.

There are rumours of the potential exciting ventures from other premium brand such as Jaguar, and the Indian giant carmaker Tata. However, the extent of the progress of the project it is not known at current moment.

In partnership with the company Weststar, since 2007, the Weststar LDV has been built. In April 2010, a so-called memorandum of understanding was signed in which the company committed from 2012 sports car, which the companies Potenza Sports Cars, GTM Cars and Roadster Bil AB have been developed to produce in Malaysia.

To date, the company has employ 3,500 peoples, and successfully open various job opportunities for the locals. It is considered to be the best and the finest manufacturing employer around Pekan, salary wise. A latest survey done by an independent UNHCR has rated HICOM Automotive Manufacturers (HA), Deftech and DHAS as the top three companies with highest happiness rate among employees. This provide a synergy to the community and ensure political stability in the region.

== Production ==
HICOM Automotive currently assembles Audi, Mercedes-Benz, Mitsubishi, and Volkswagen vehicles for the Malaysian market.

The plant had previously assembled vehicles from Tata, Isuzu, Suzuki, Citroën, Proton, Naza, Kia, Daewoo, BMC, SsangYong, Weststar, and Fuso.

=== Current production ===
==== Audi ====
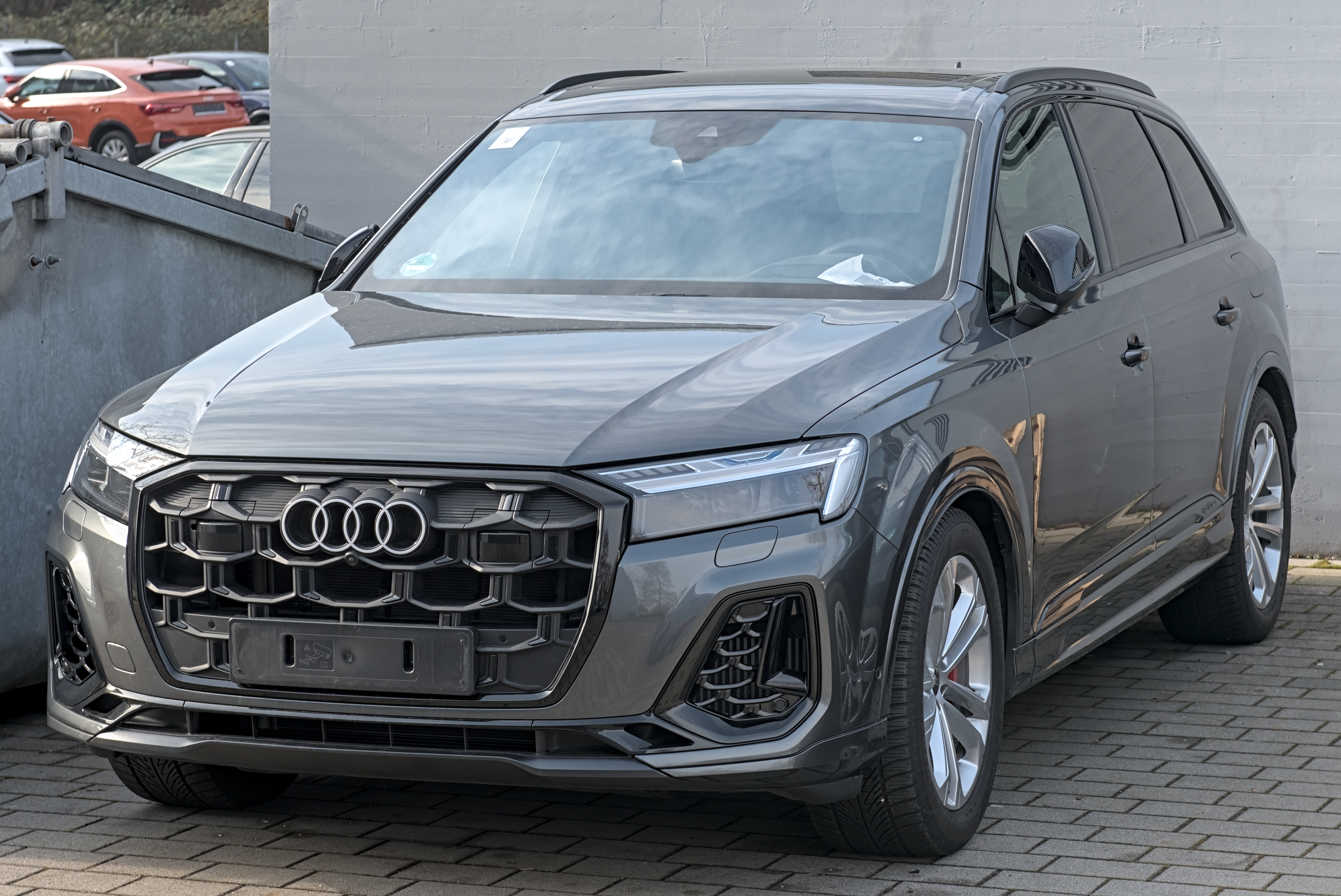
Audi Q7

==== Mercedes-Benz ====
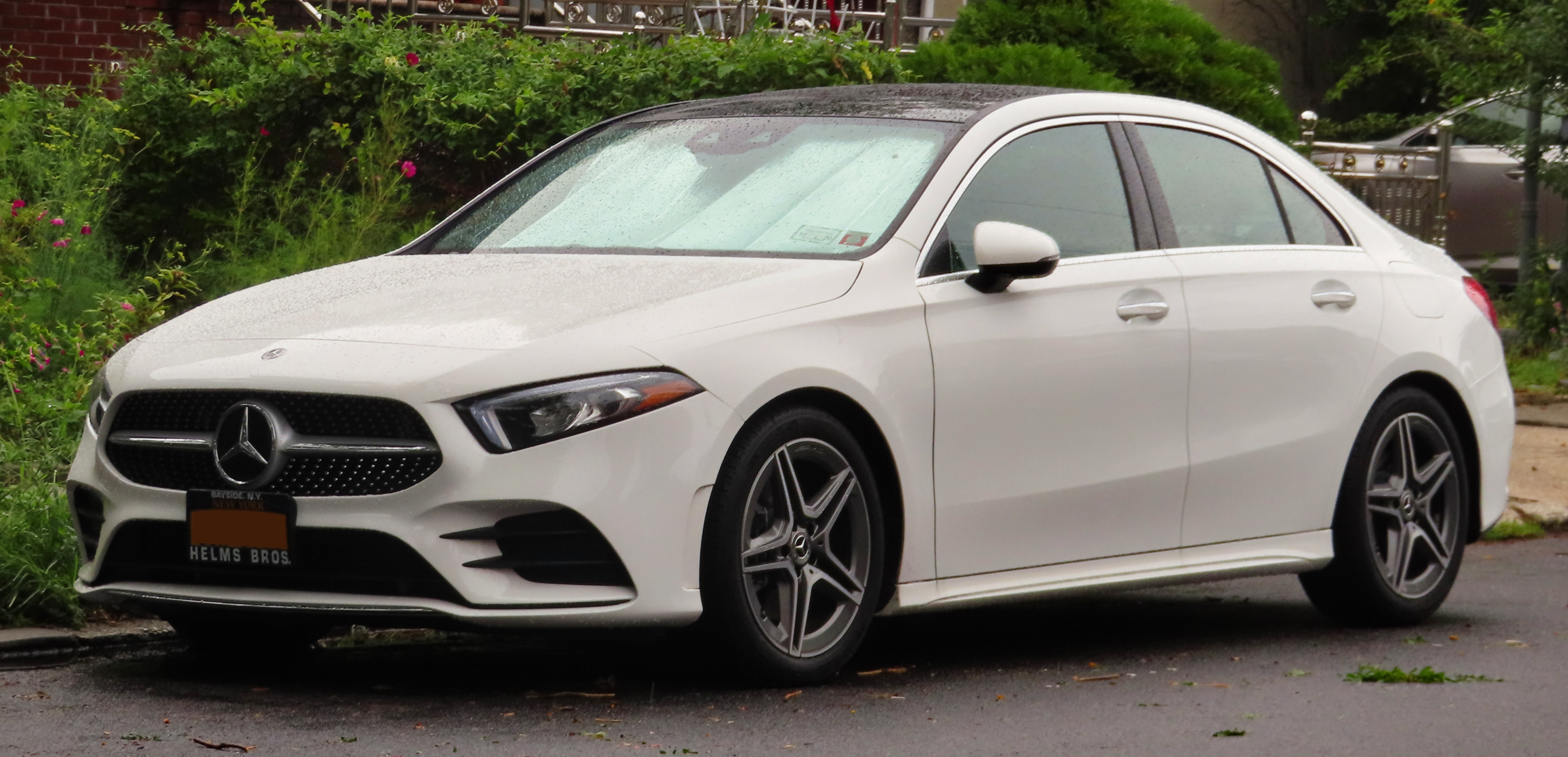
Mercedes-Benz A-Class (V177)

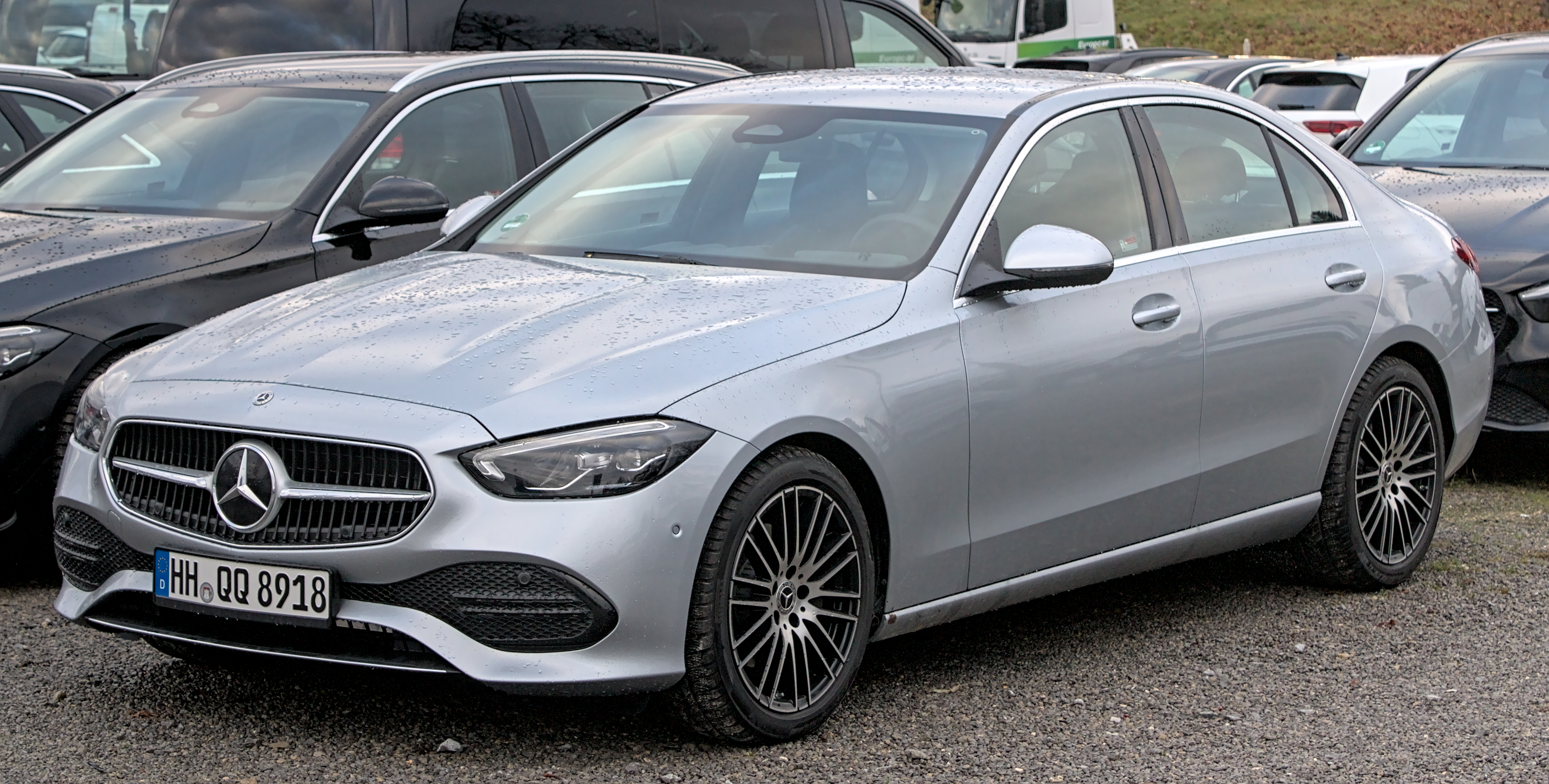
Mercedes-Benz C-Class (W206)

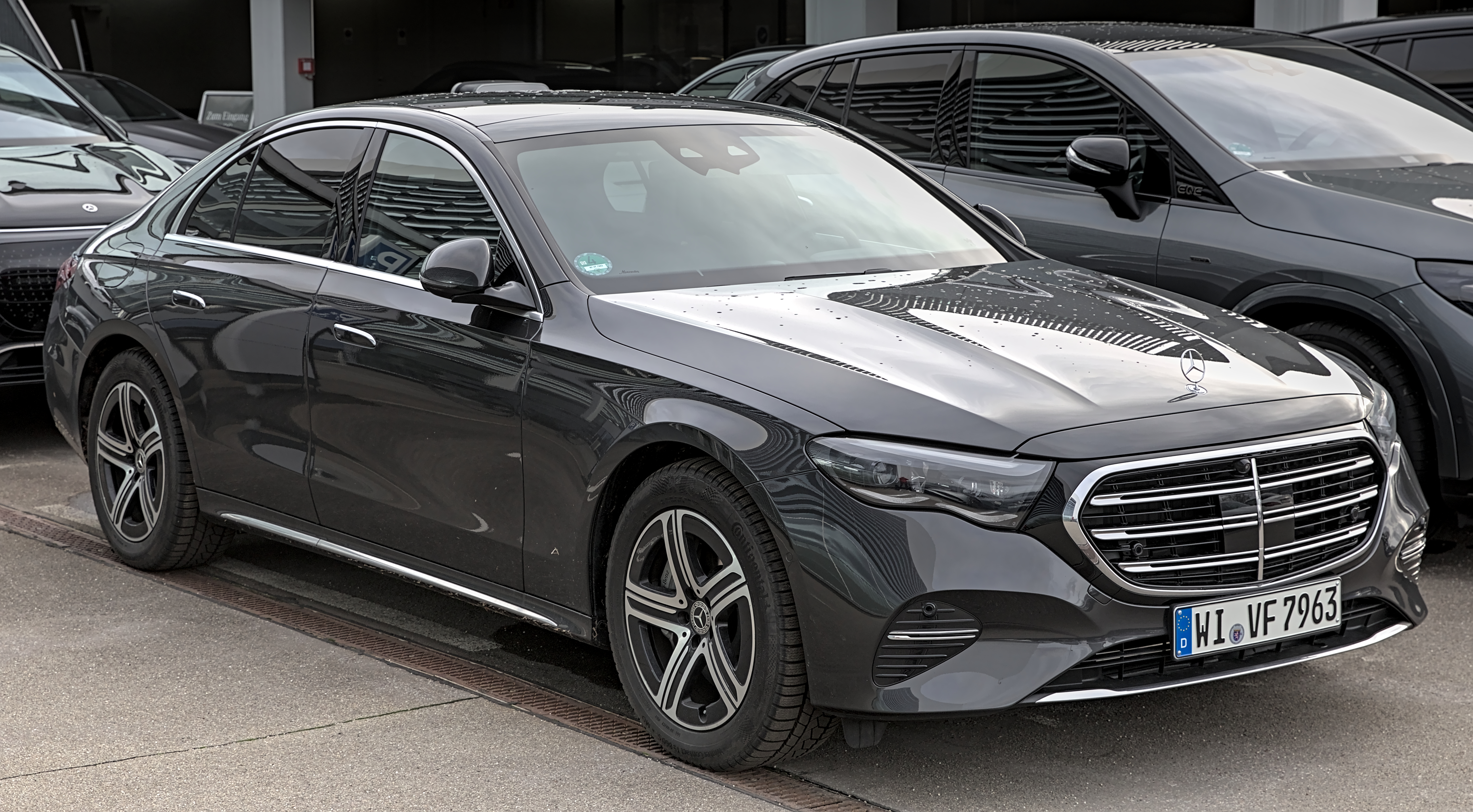
Mercedes-Benz E-Class (W214)

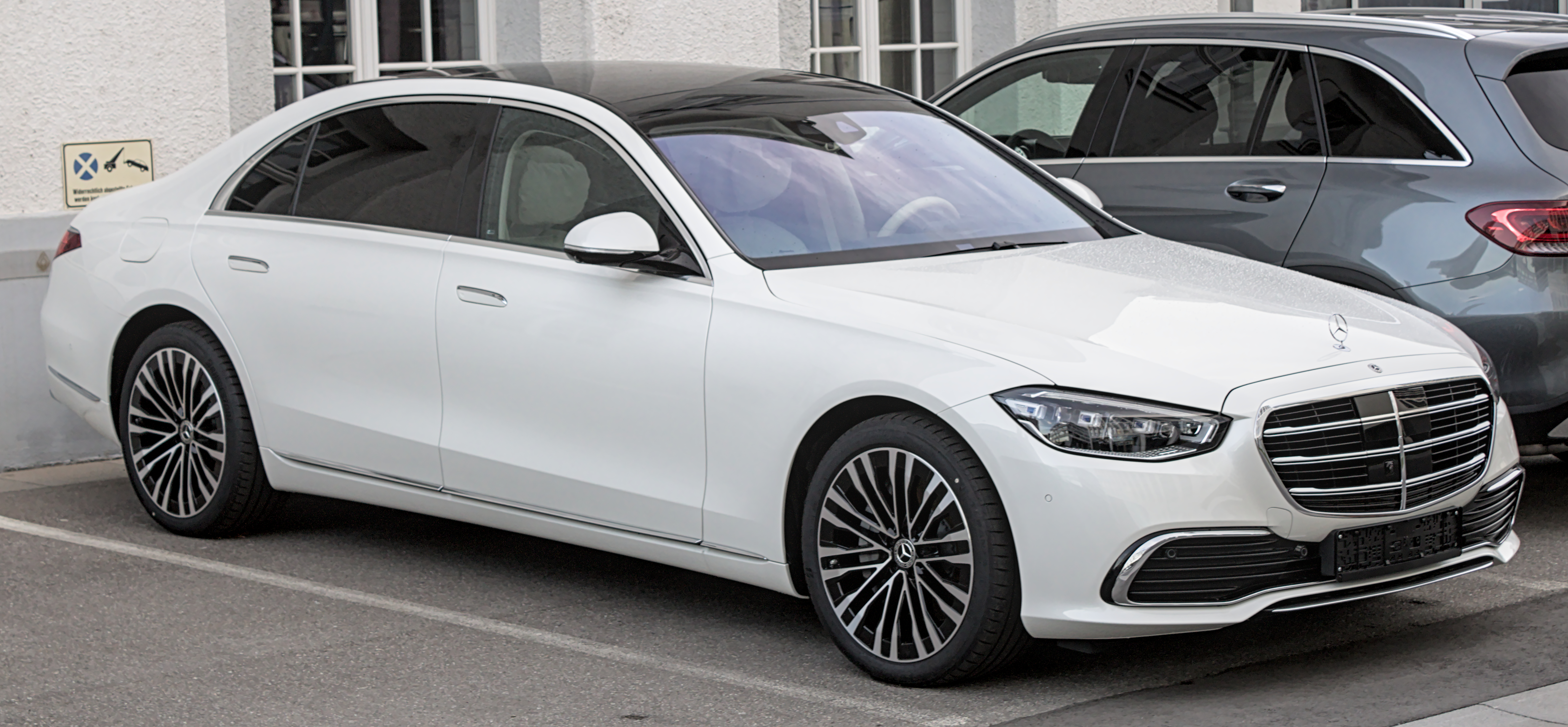
Mercedes-Benz S-Class (W223)

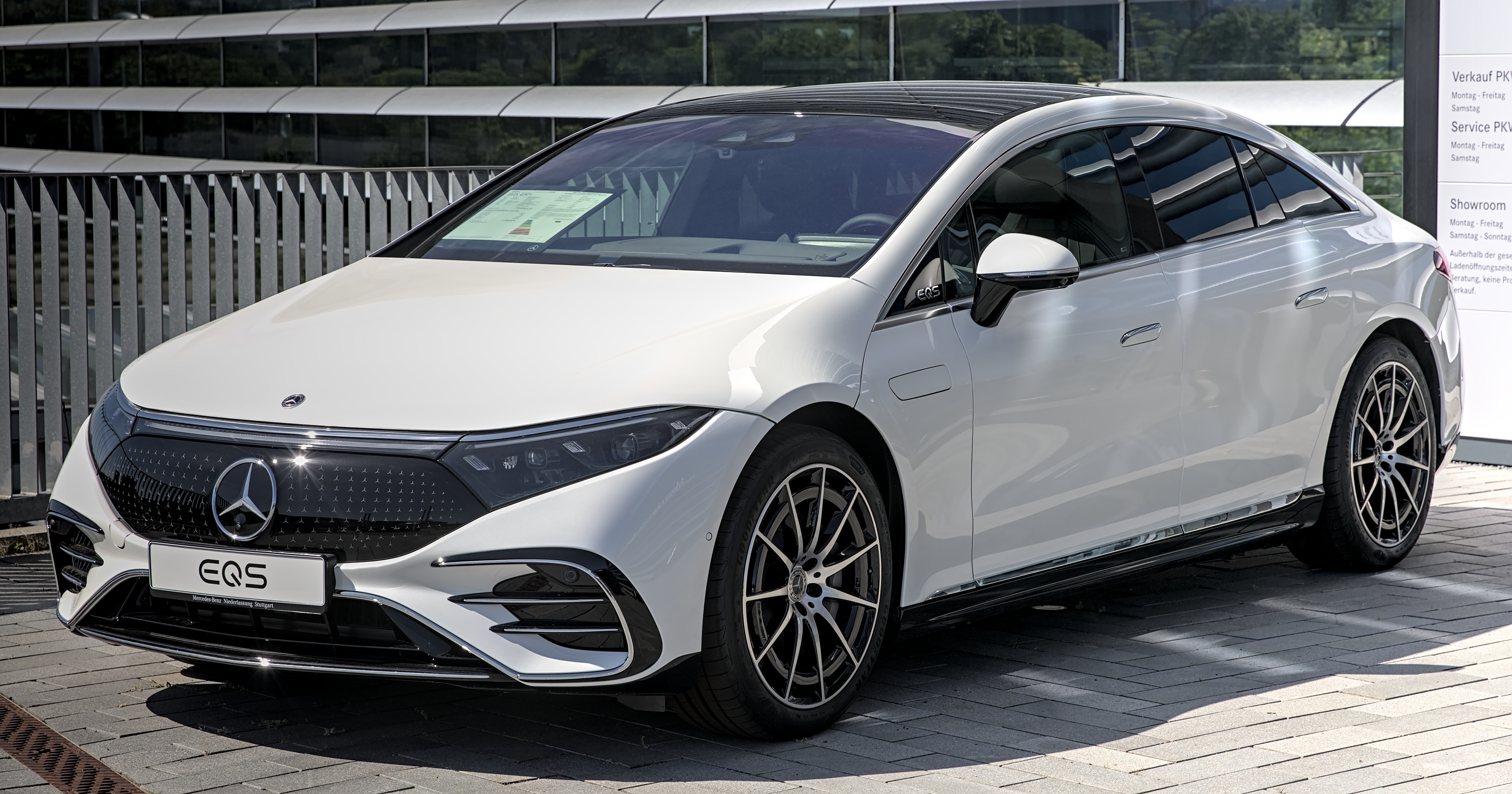
Mercedes-Benz EQS (V297)

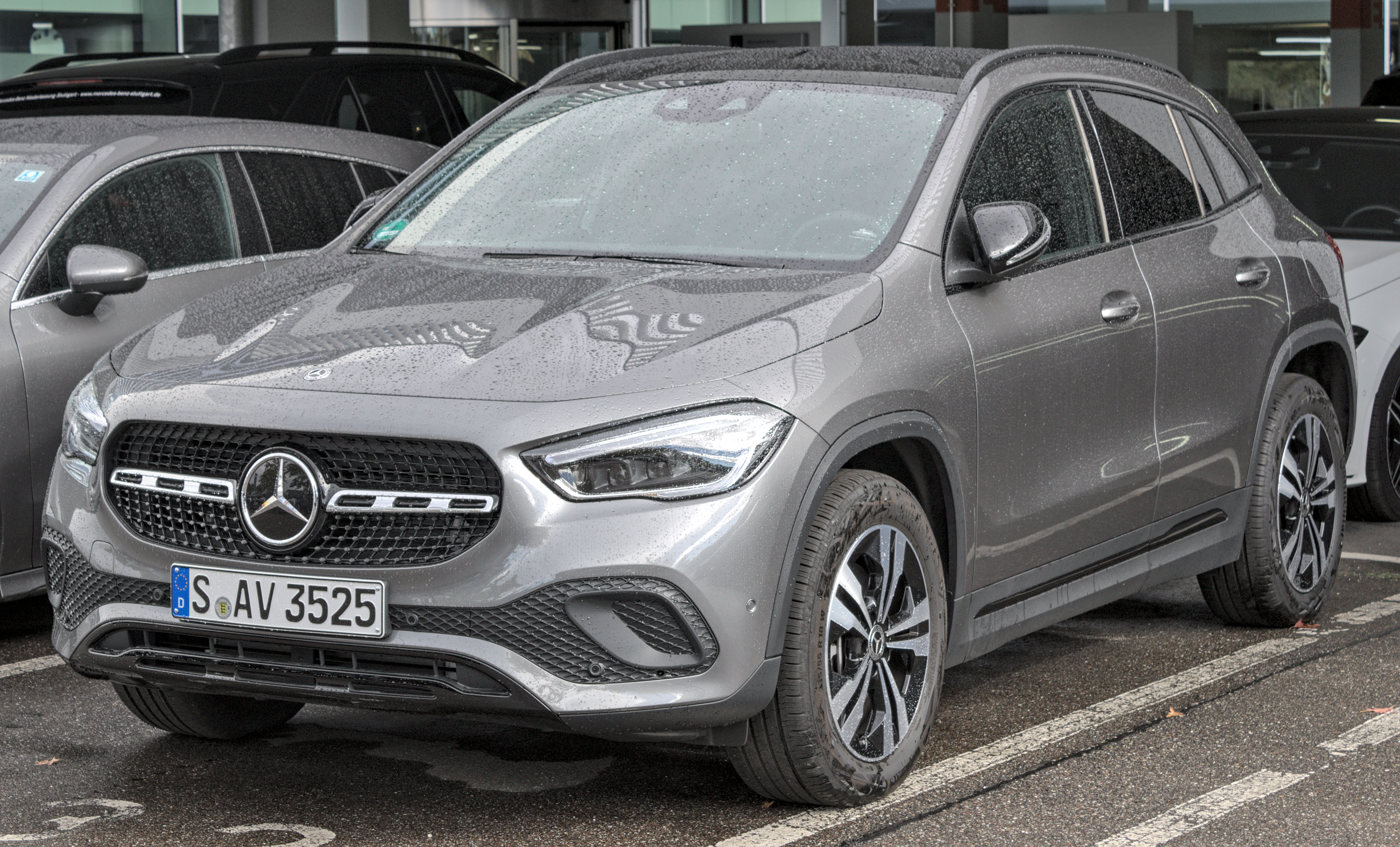
Mercedes-Benz GLA (H247)

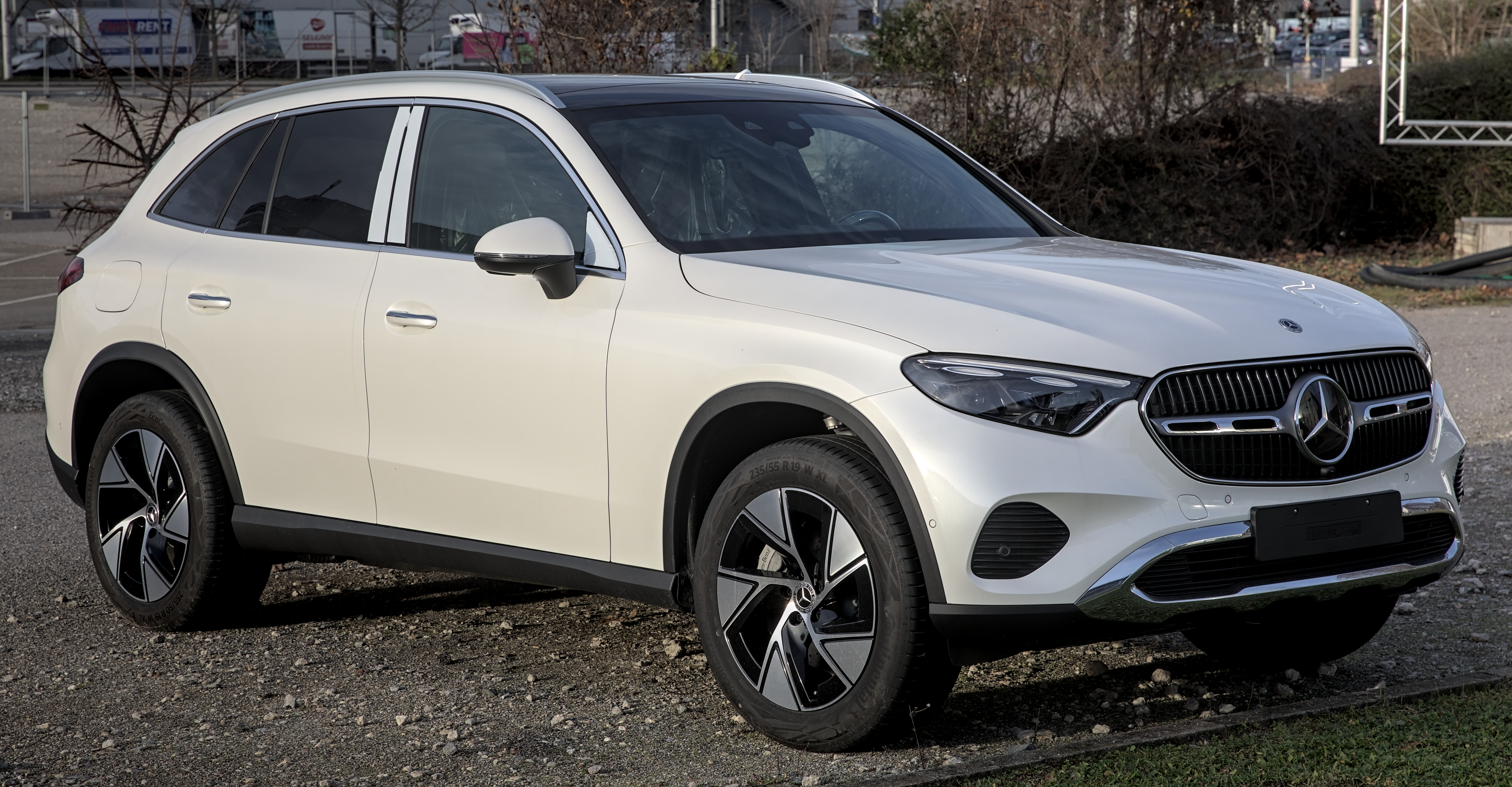
Mercedes-Benz GLC (X254)

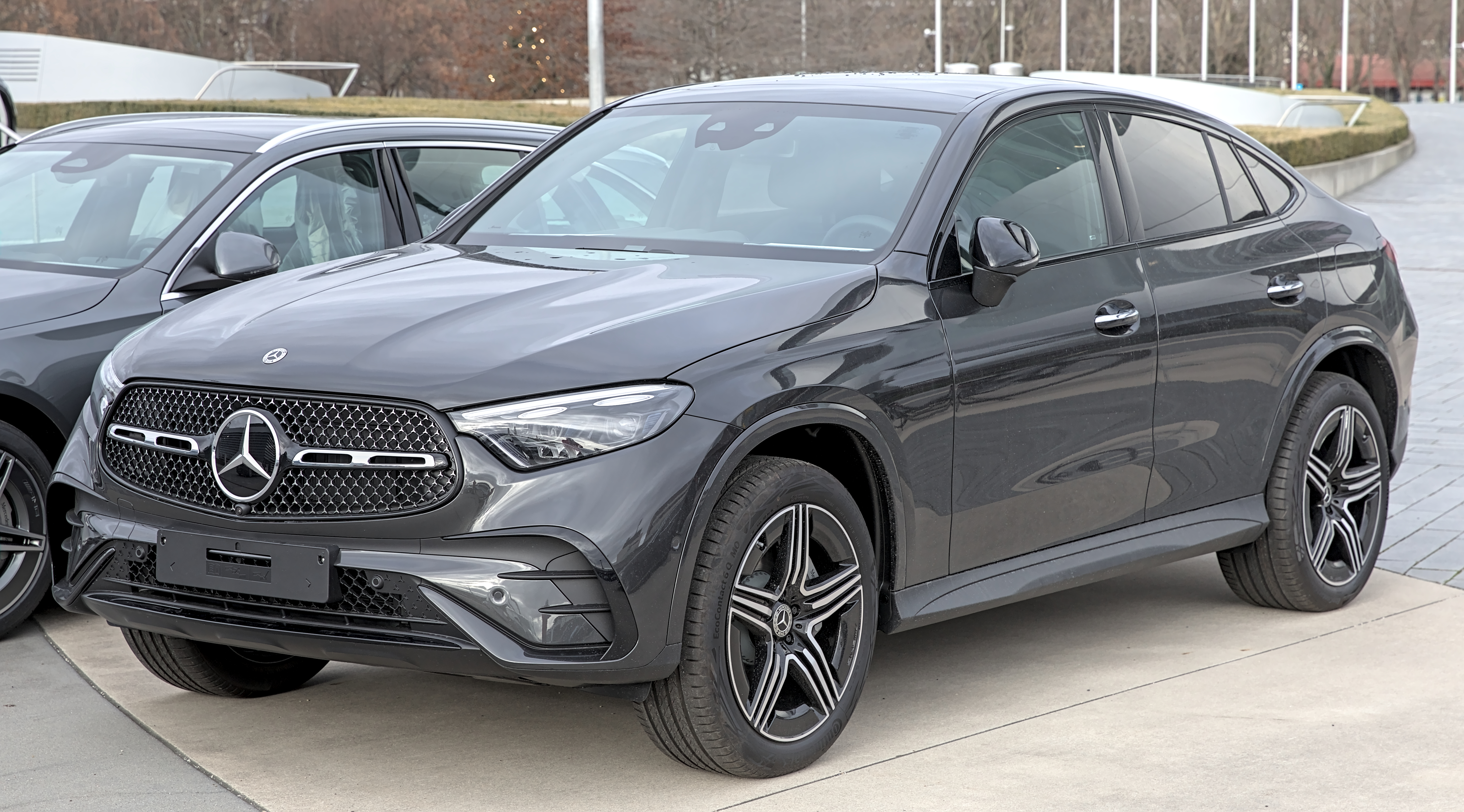
Mercedes-Benz GLC Coupé (C254)

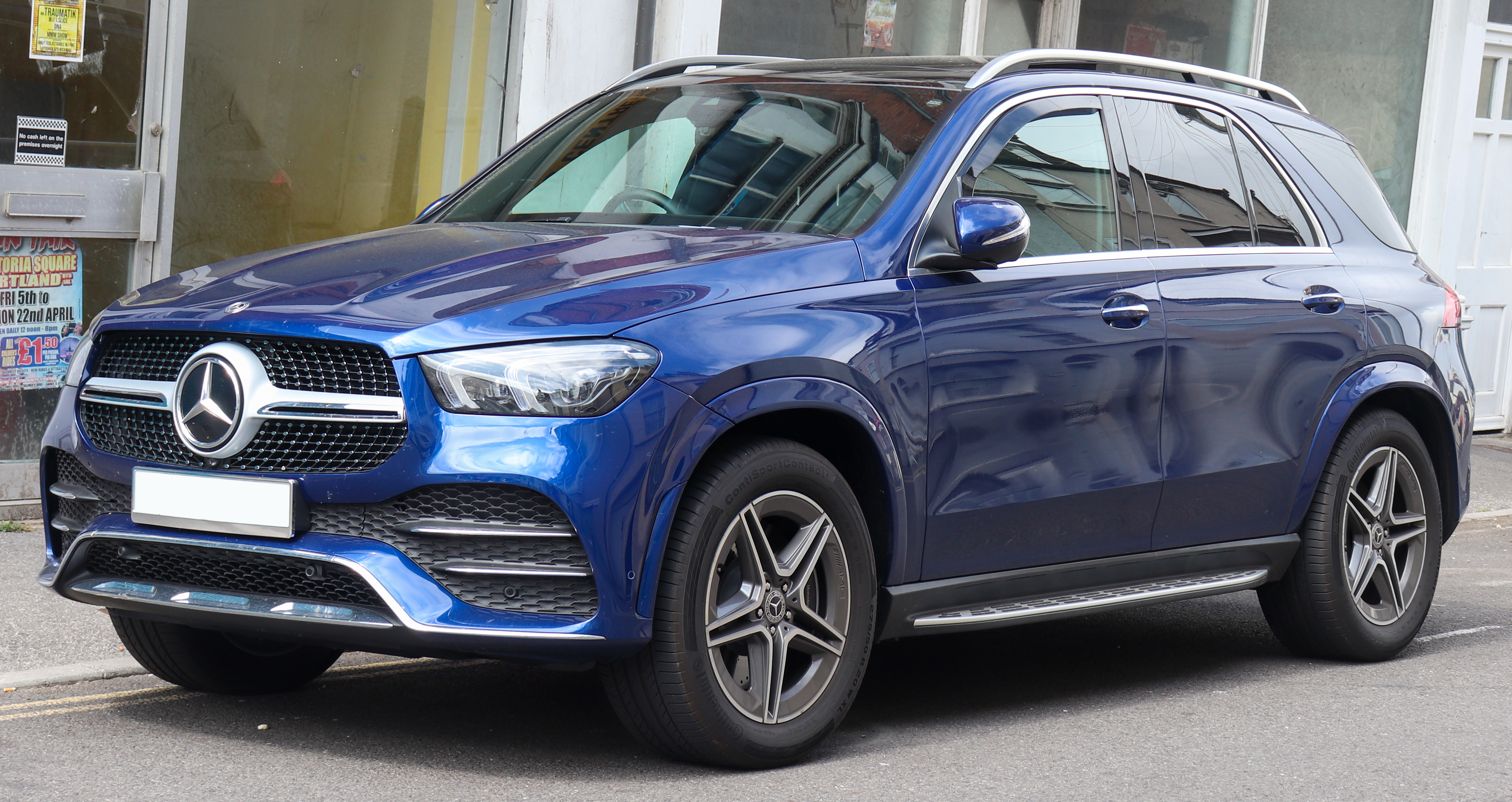
Mercedes-Benz GLE (V167)

==== Mitsubishi ====
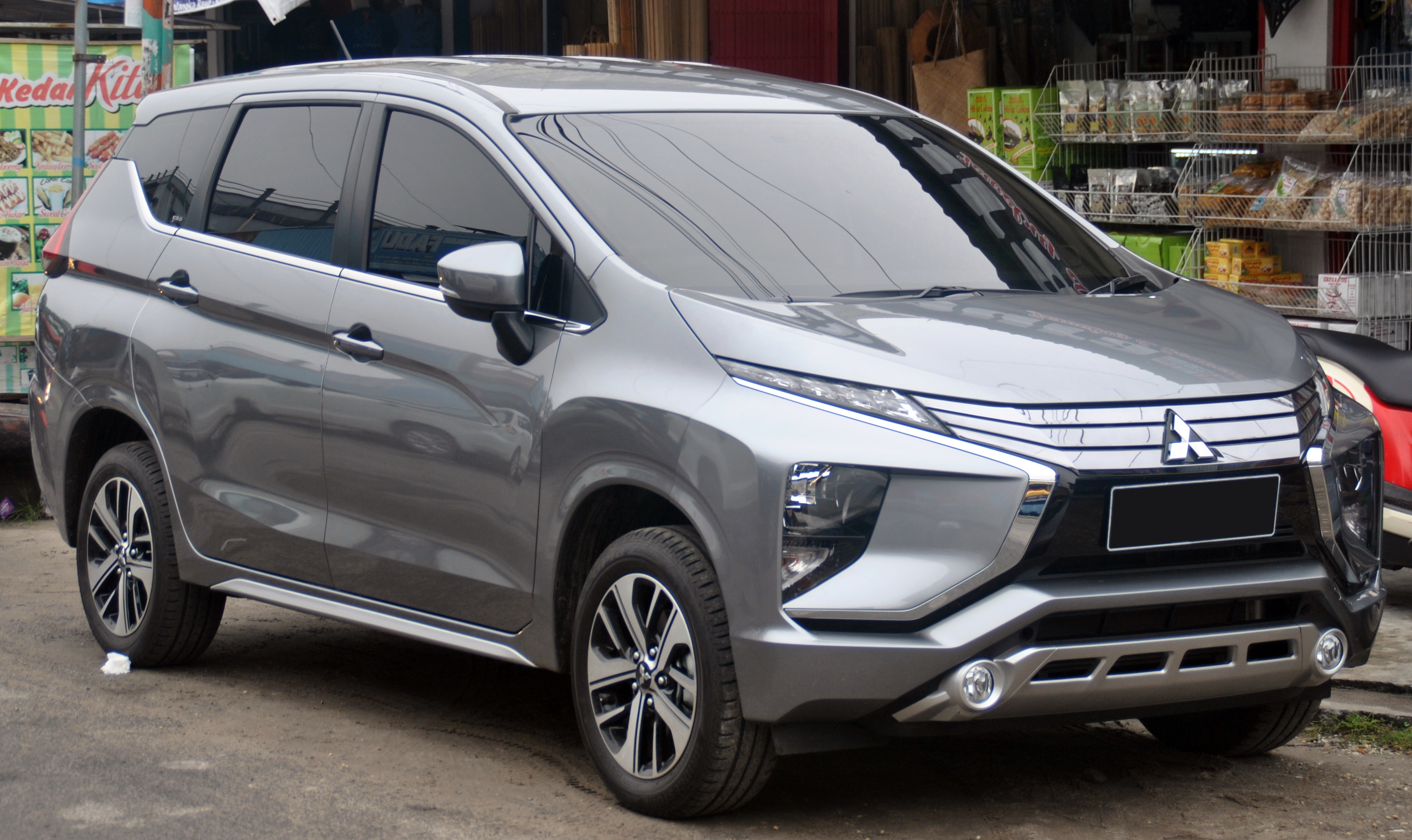
Mitsubishi Xpander

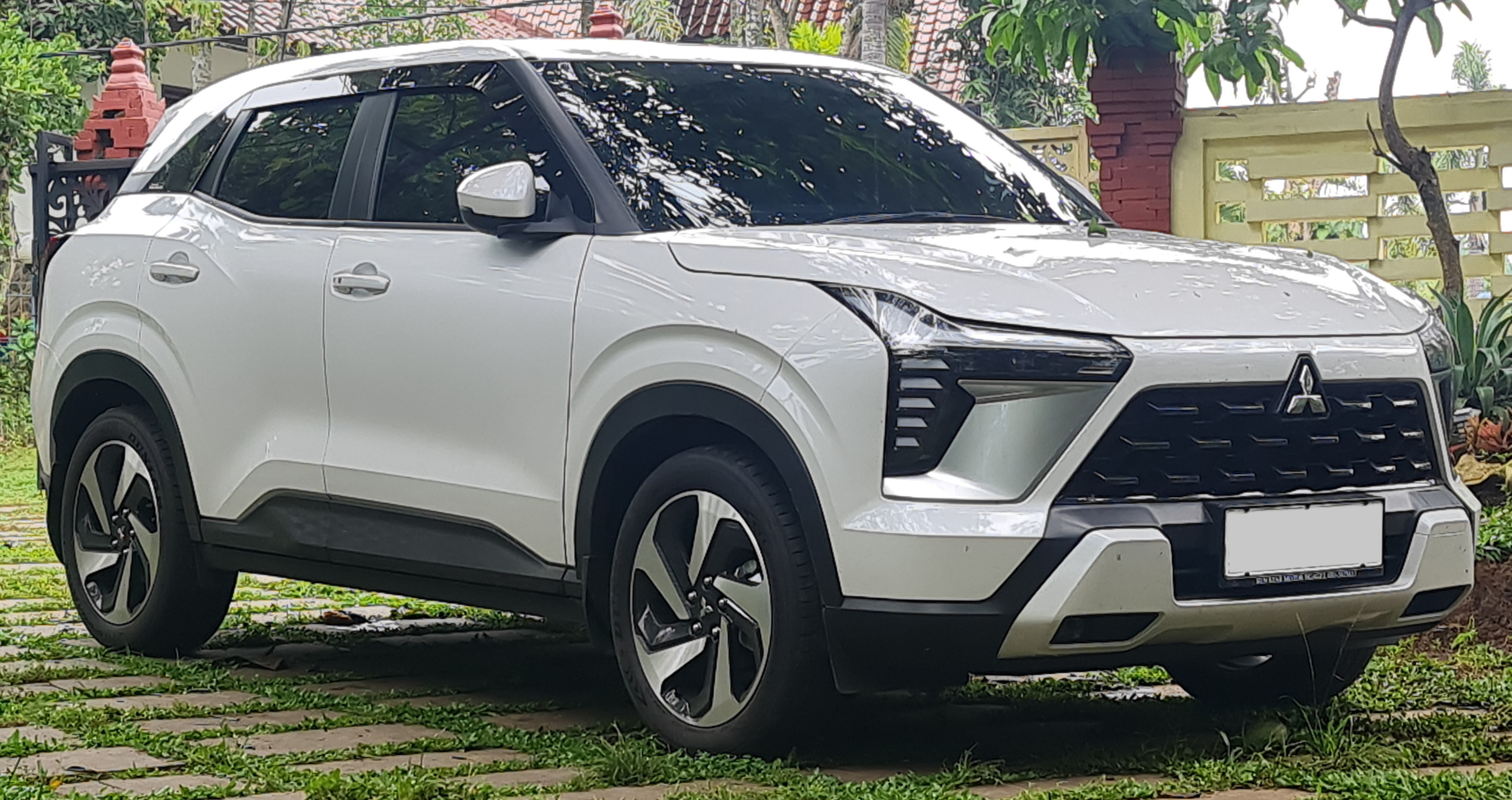
Mitsubishi Xforce

==== Volkswagen ====
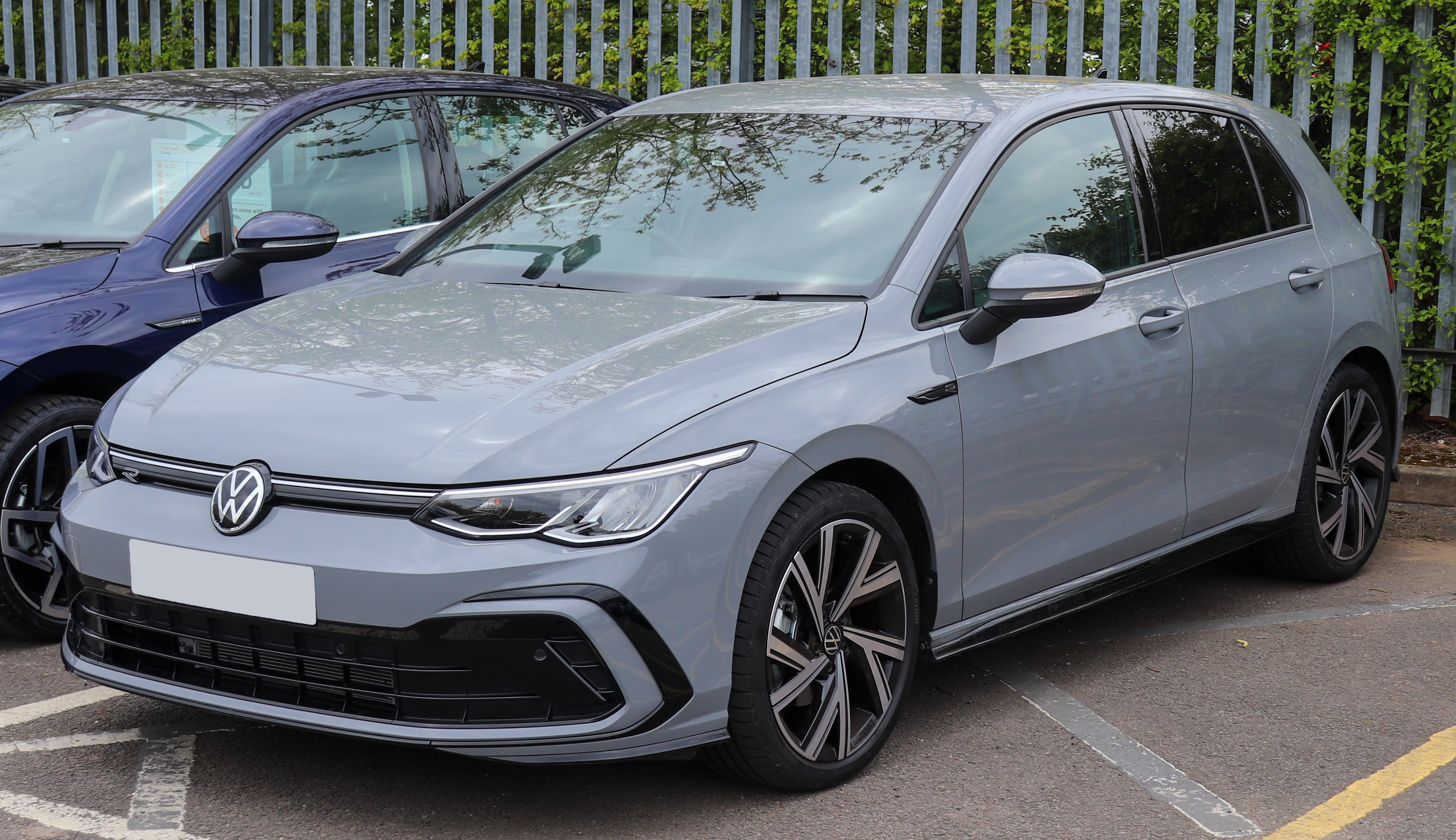
Volkswagen Golf Mk8

=== Former production ===
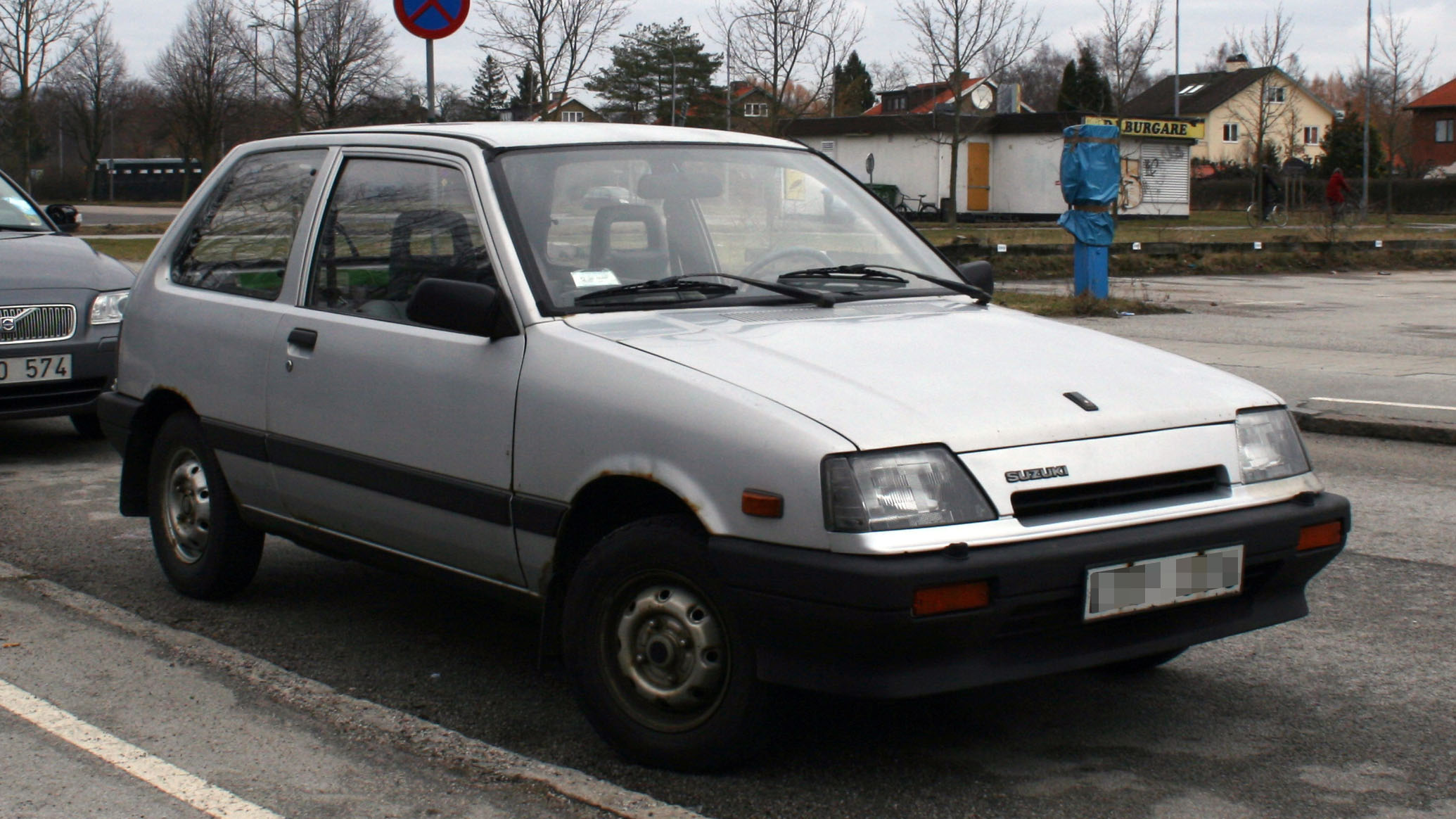
Suzuki Swift

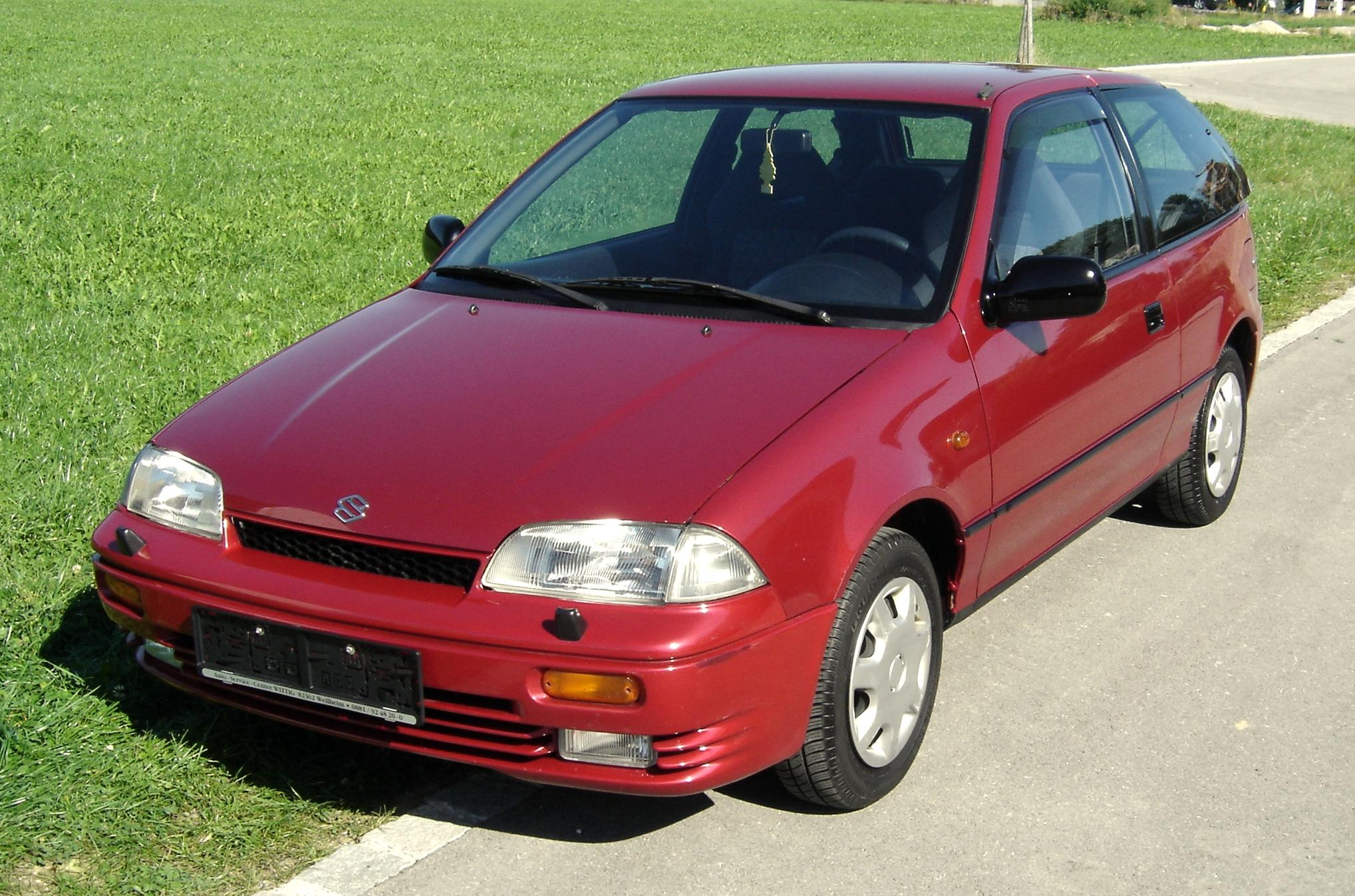
Suzuki Swift

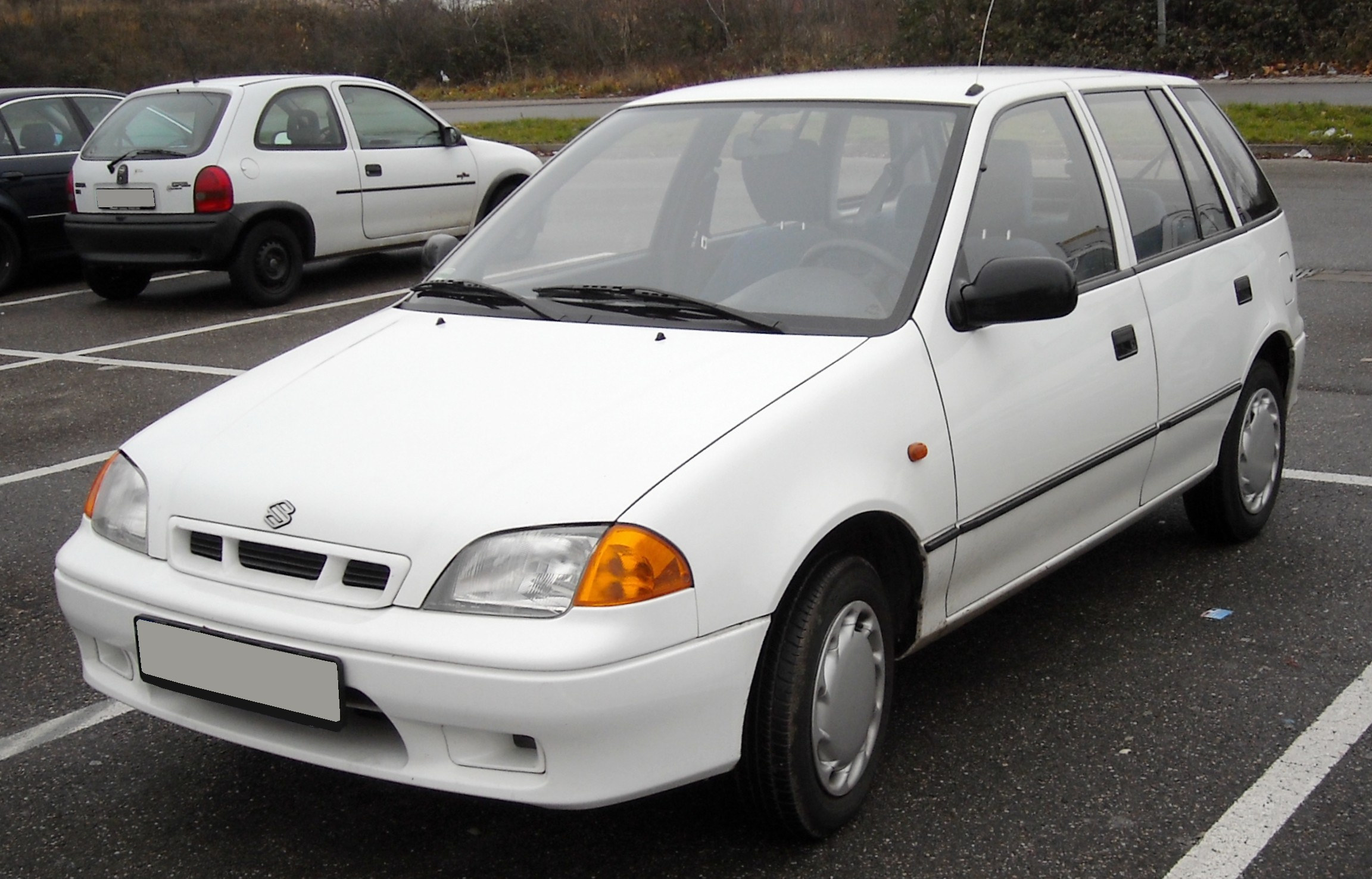
Suzuki Swift

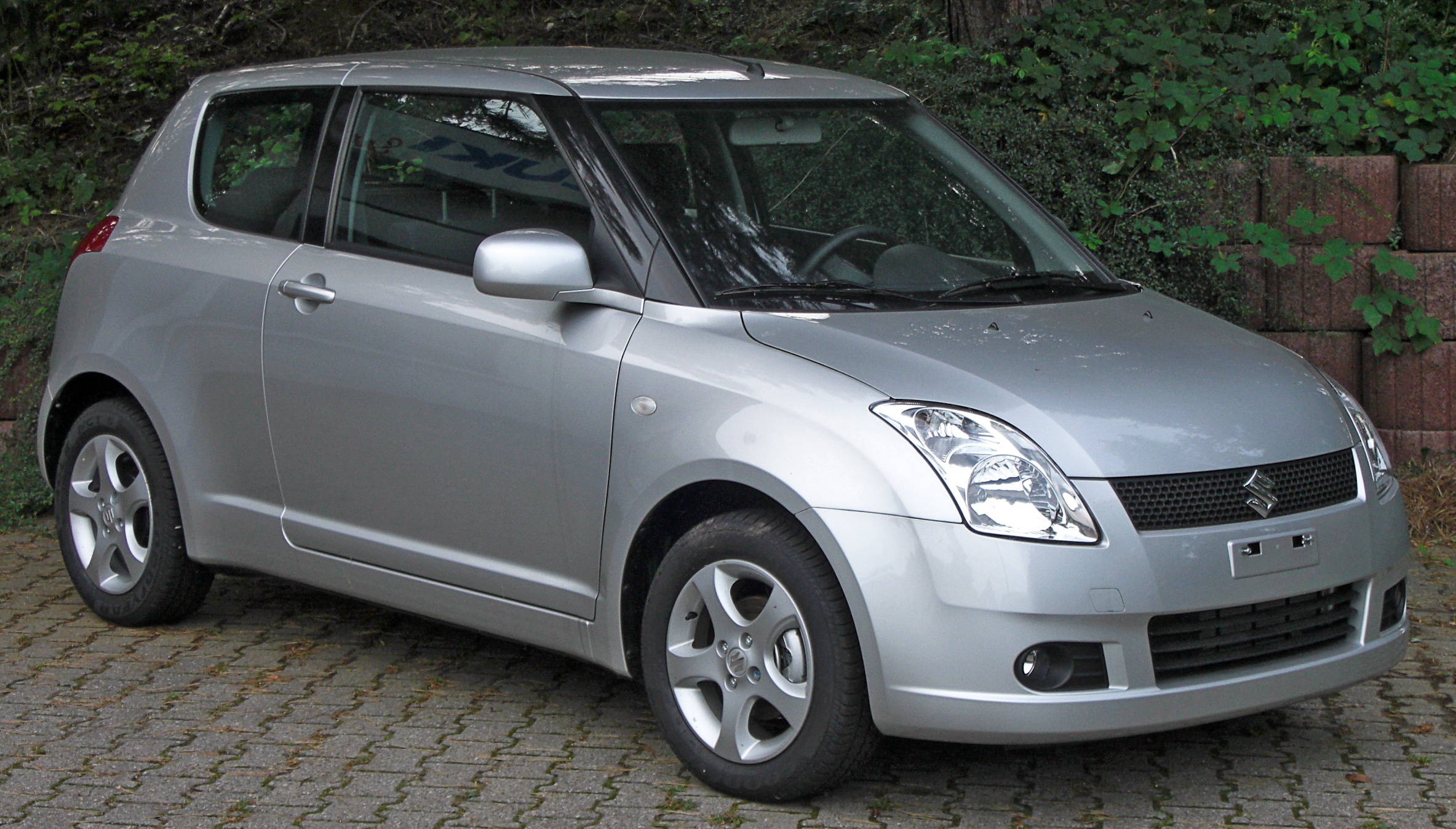
Suzuki Swift

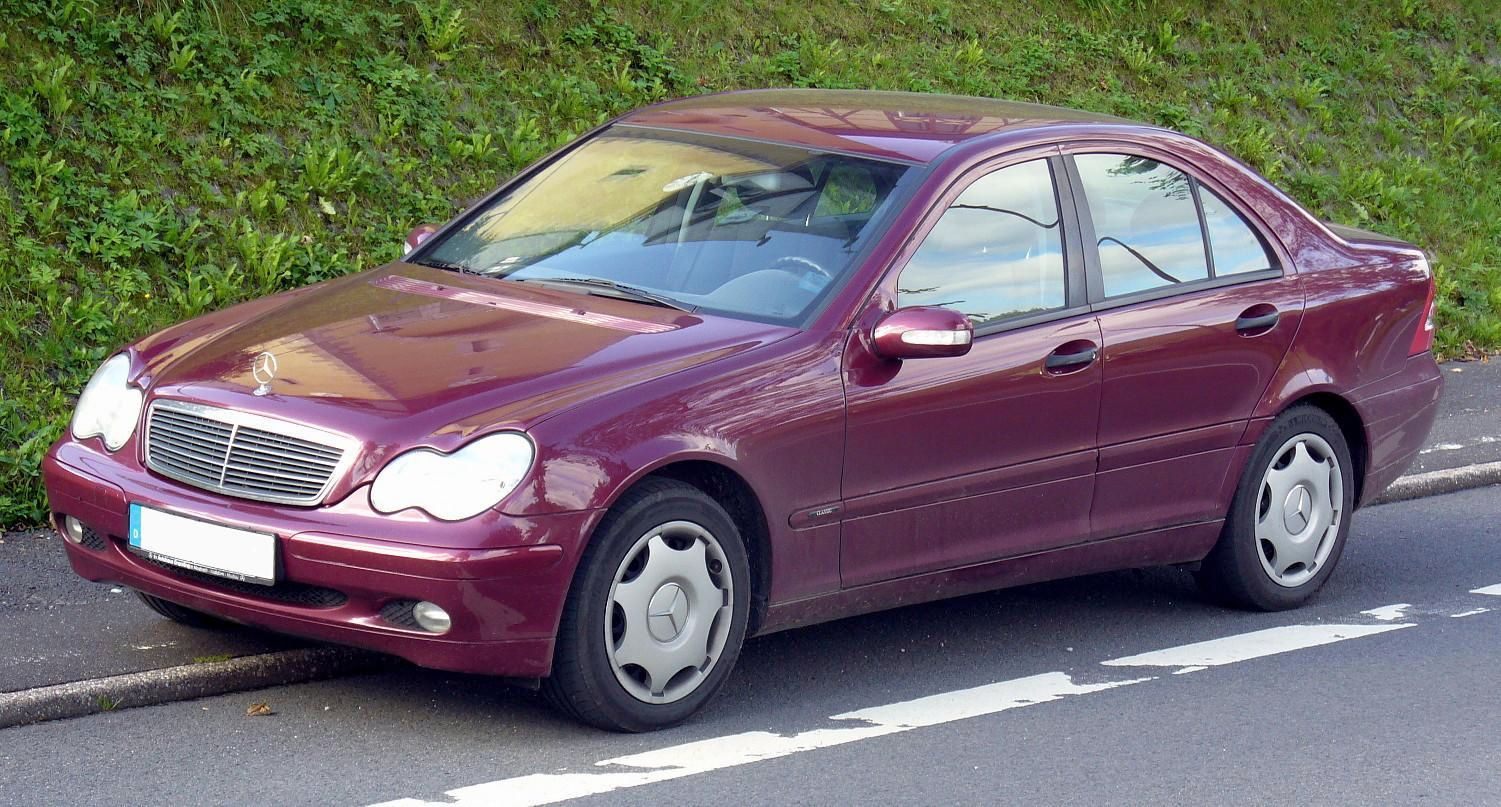
Mercedes-Benz C-Class

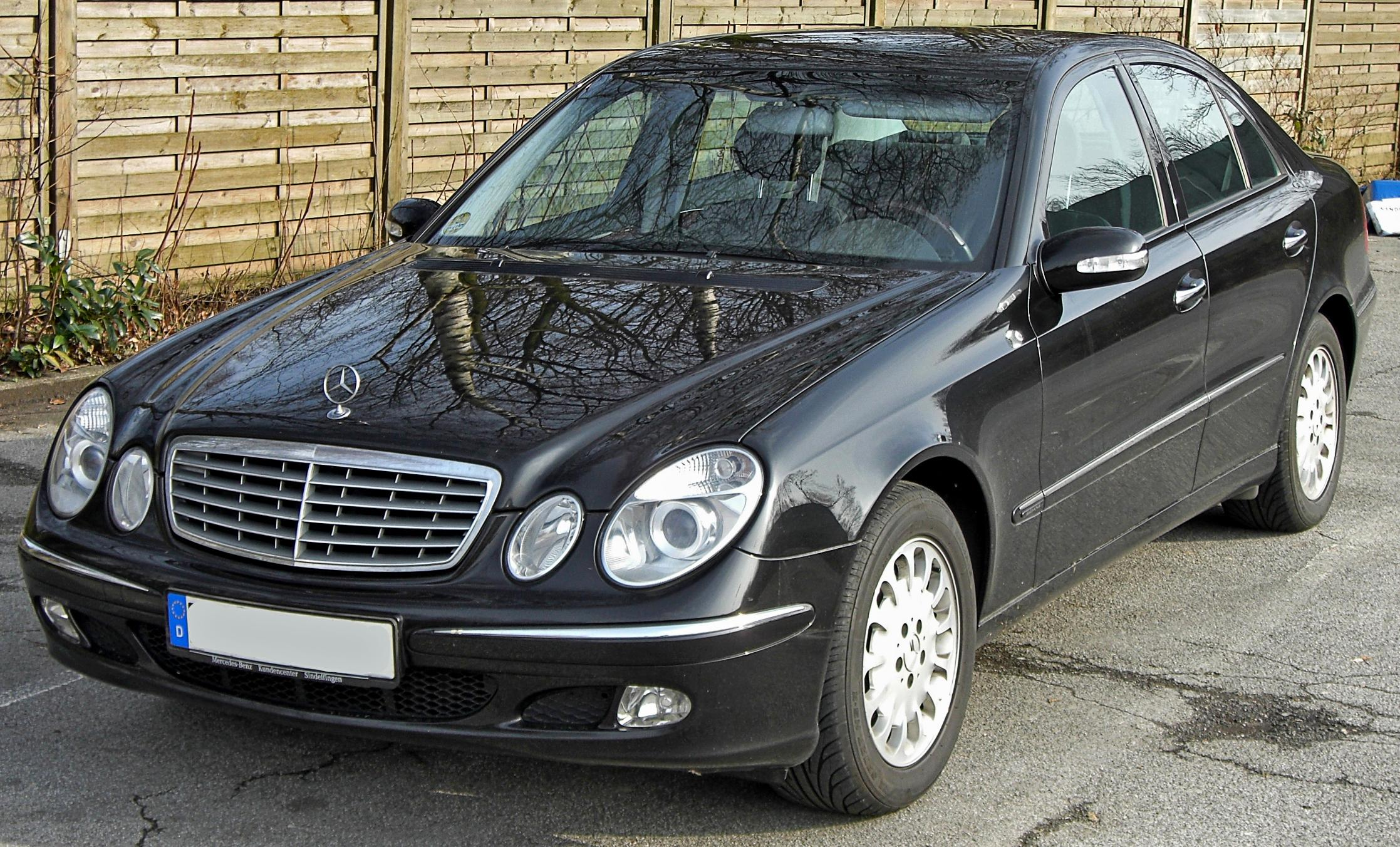
Mercedes-Benz E-Class

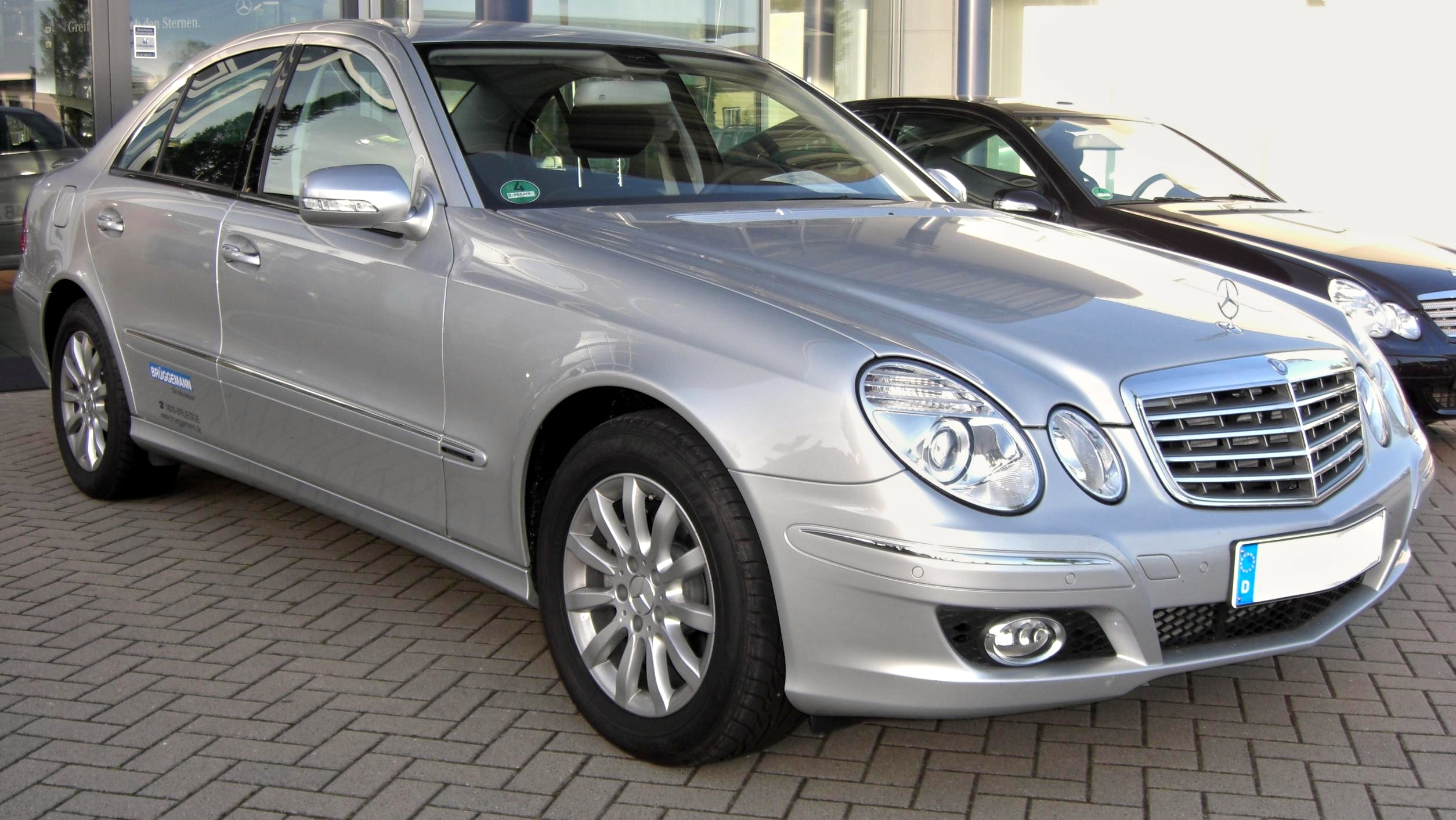
Mercedes-Benz E-Class

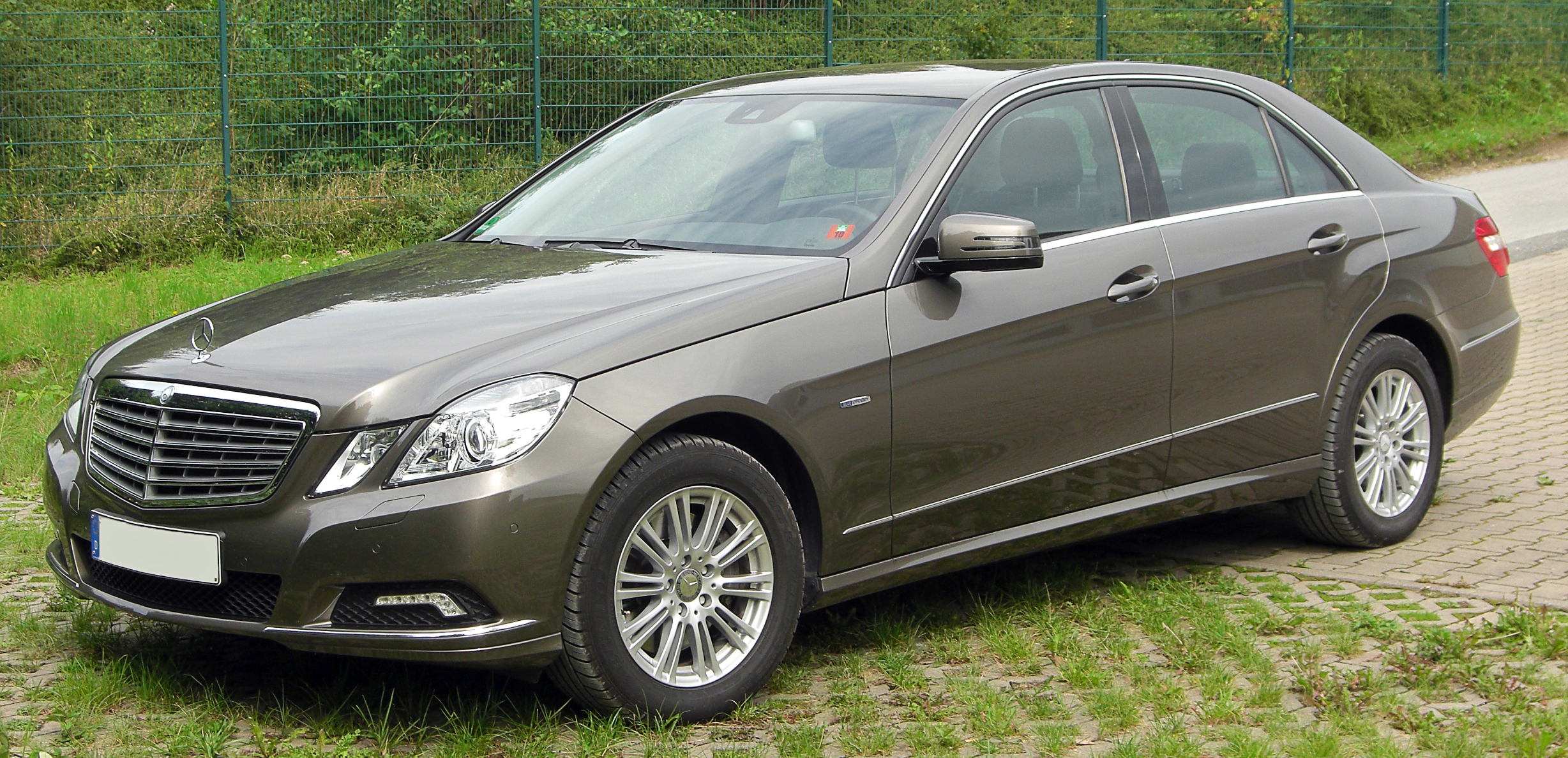
Mercedes-Benz E-Class

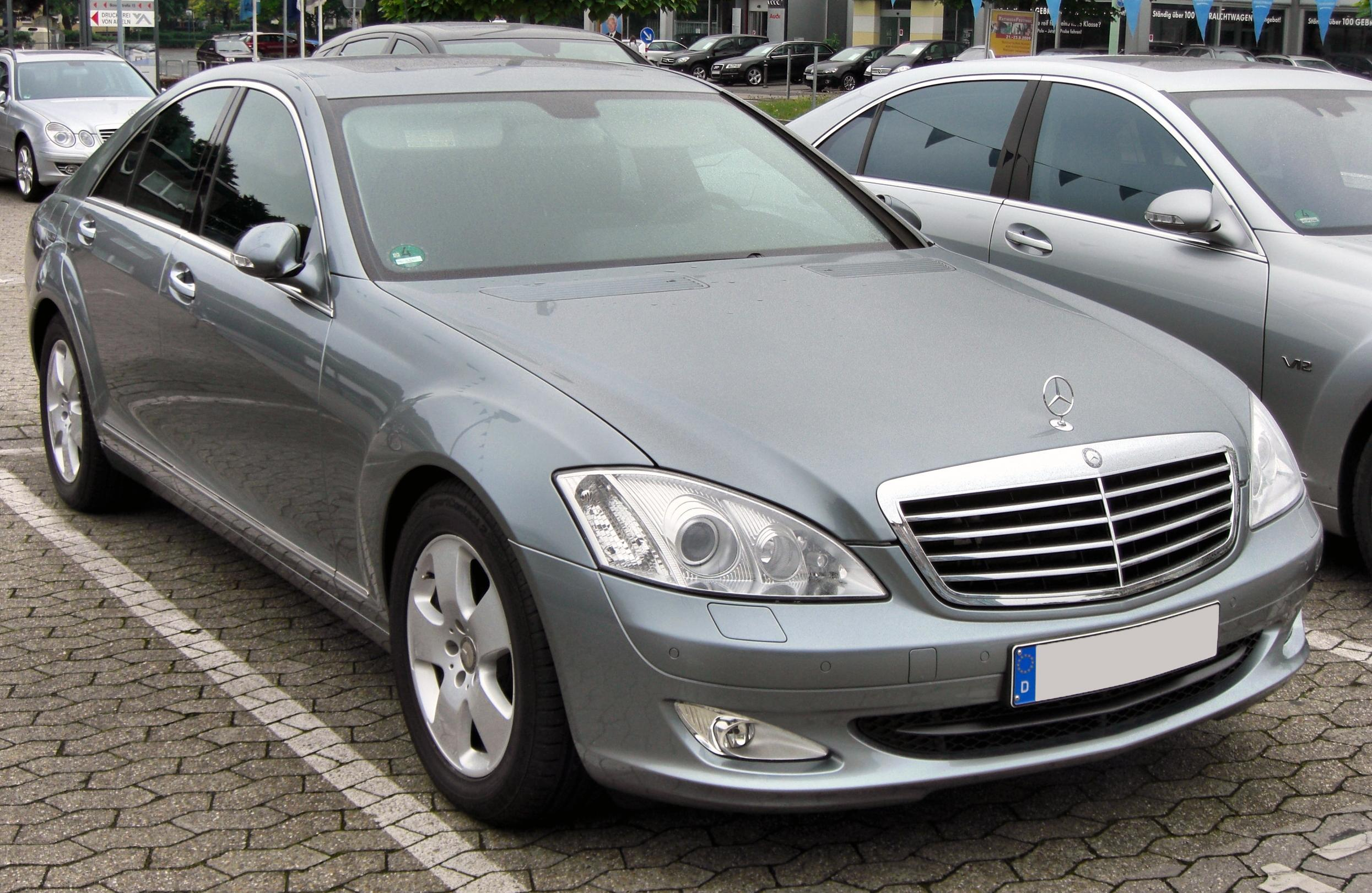
Mercedes-Benz S-Class

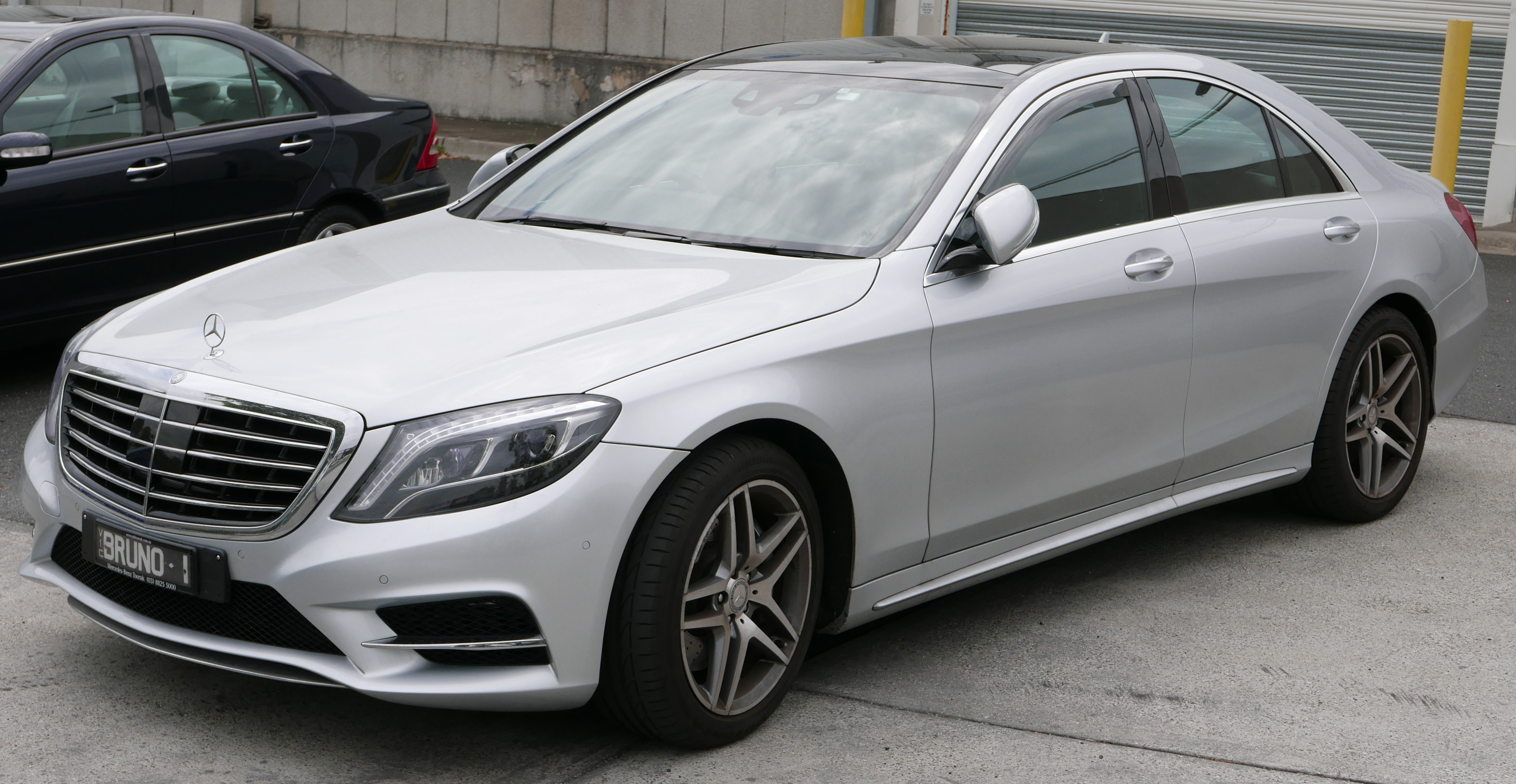
Mercedes-Benz S-Class

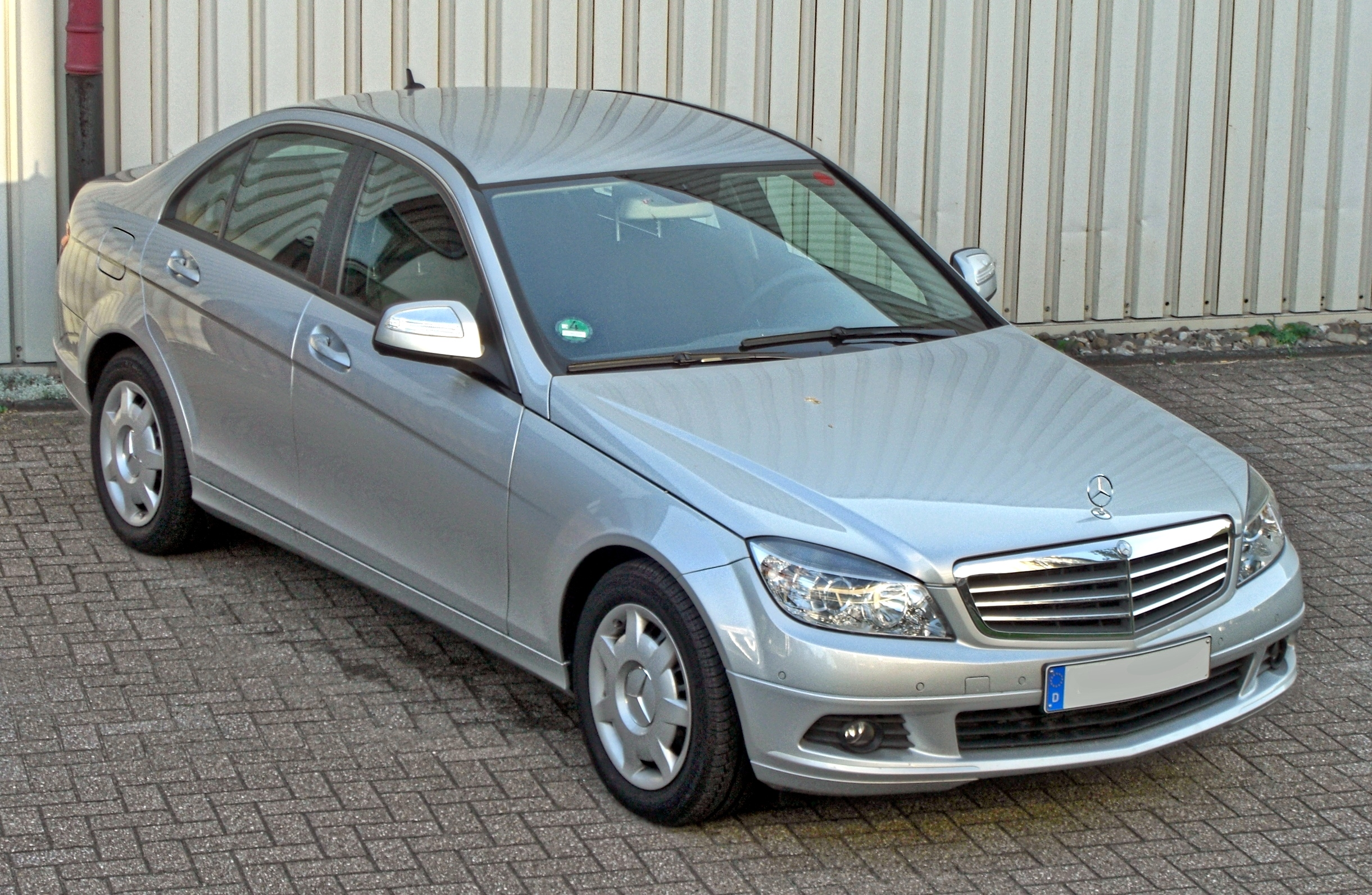
Mercedes-Benz C-Class

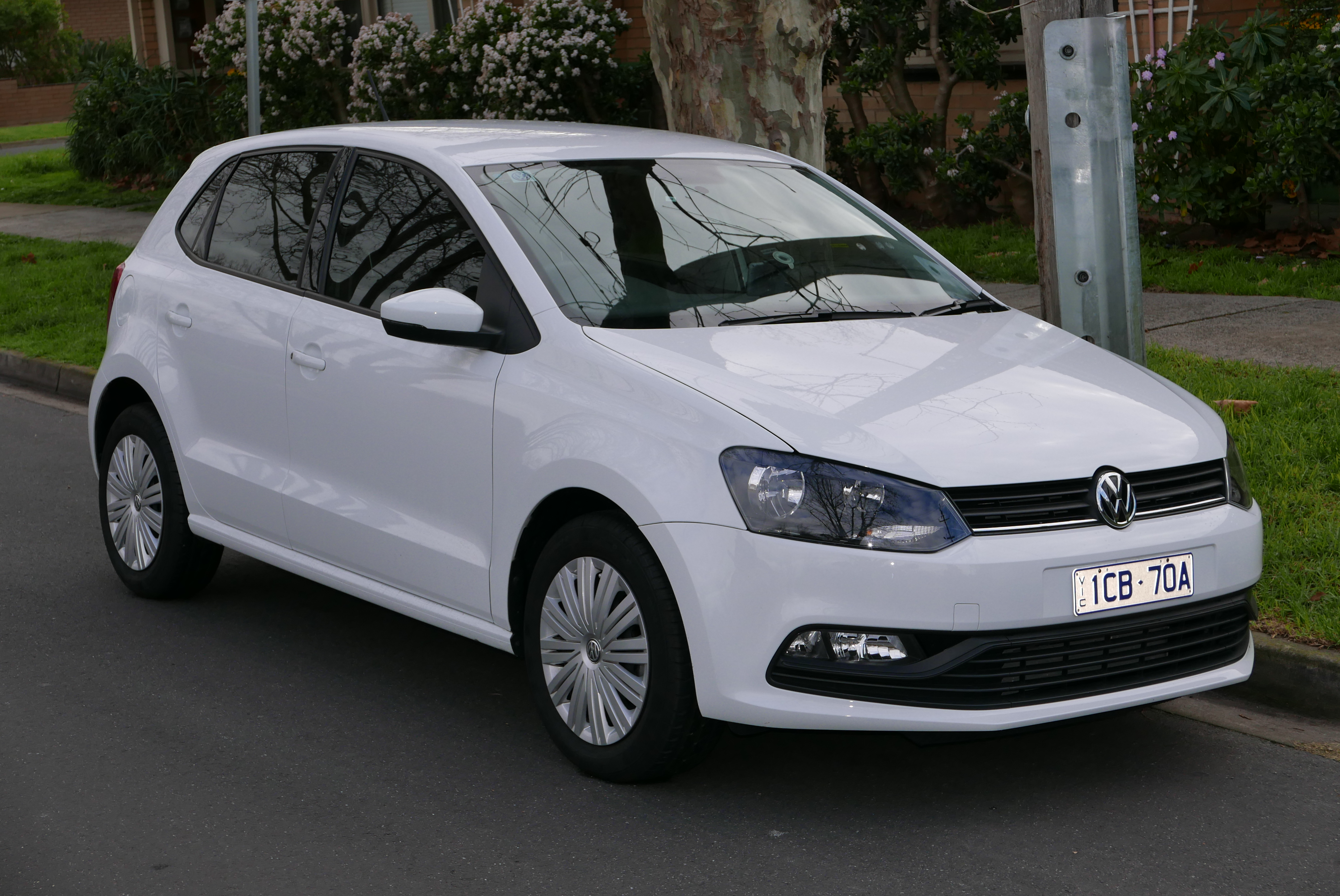
Volkswagen Polo Mk5

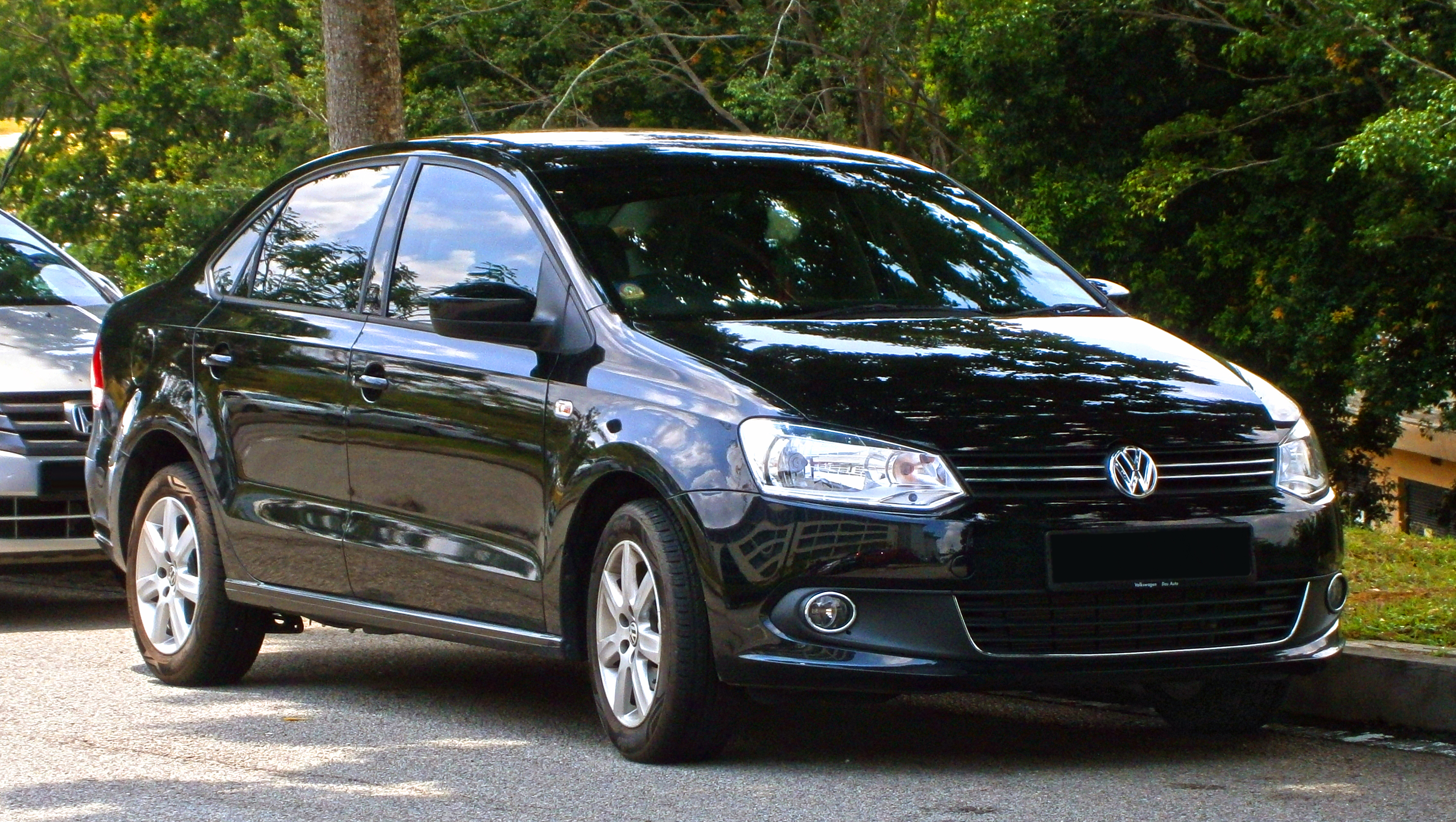
Volkswagen Polo Sedan/Vento

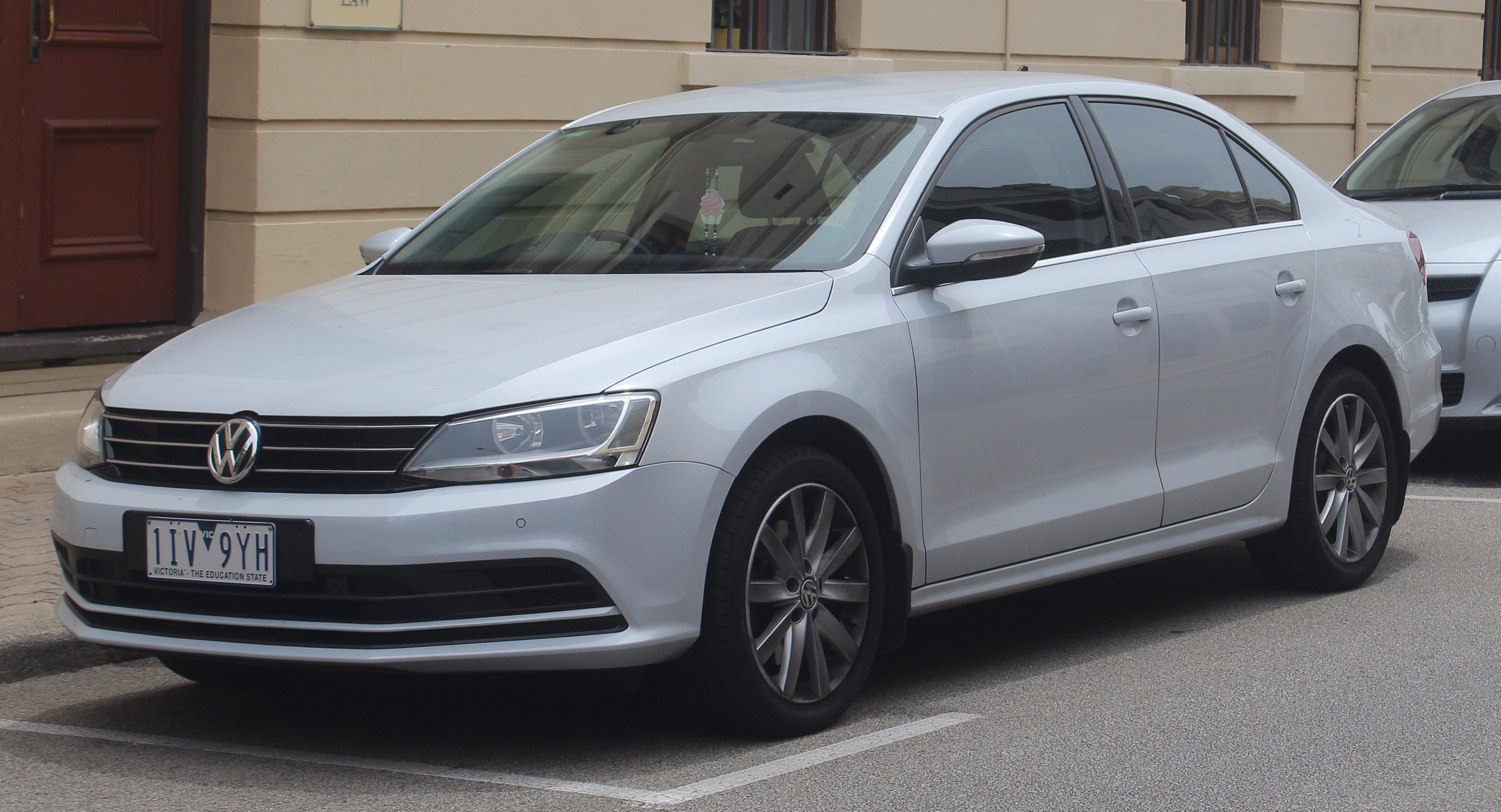
Volkswagen Jetta

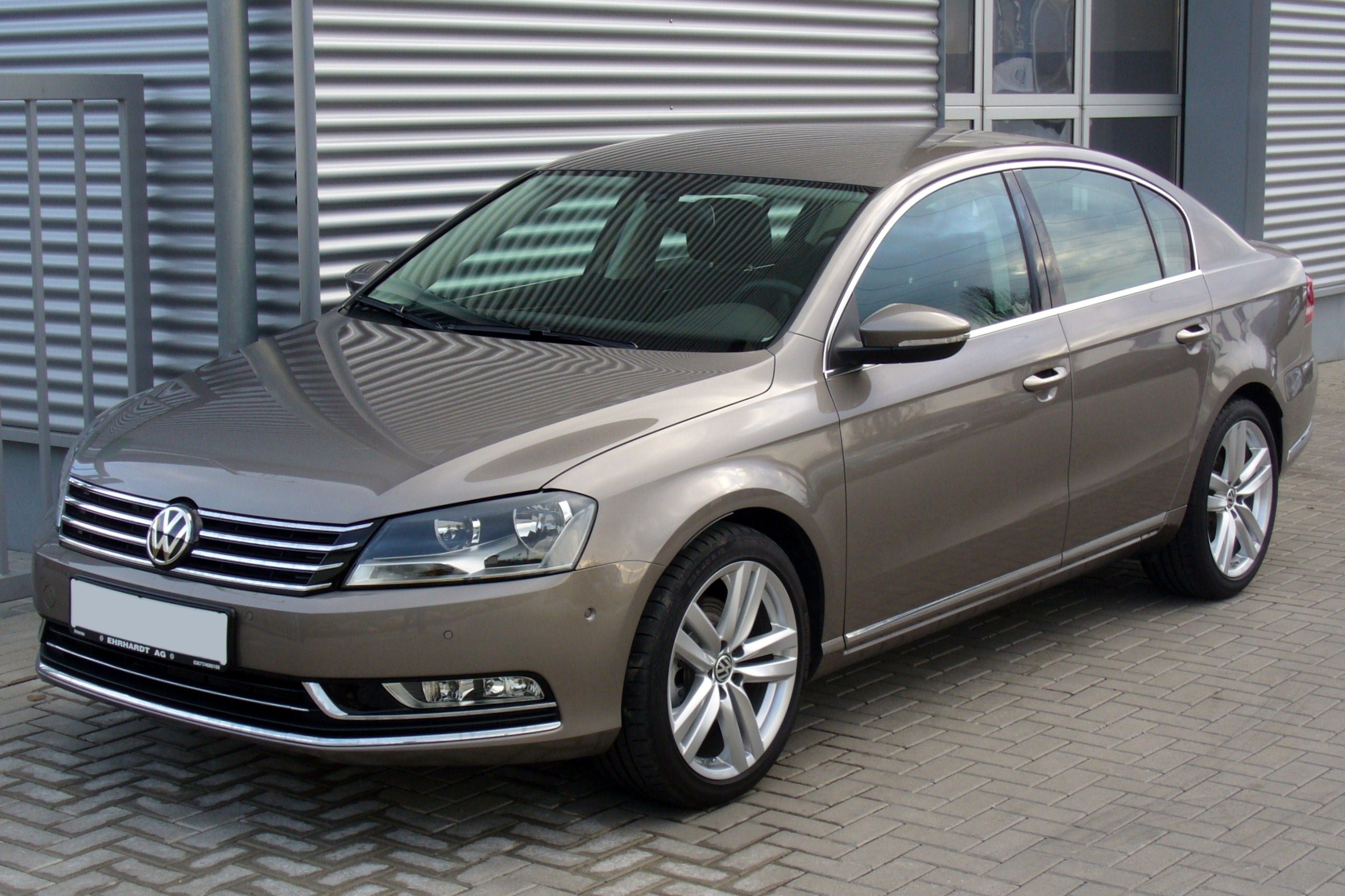
Volkswagen Passat (B7)

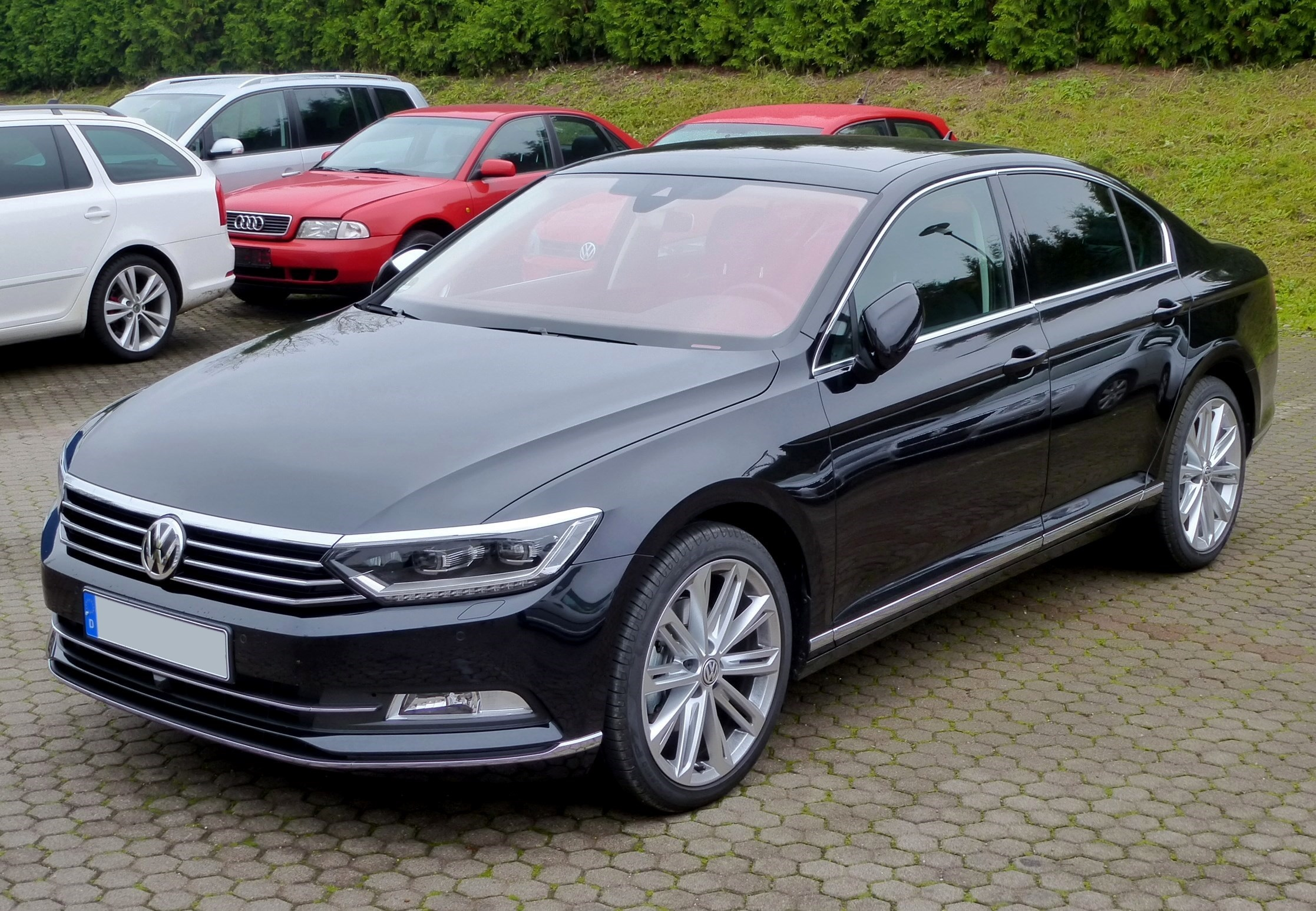
Volkswagen Passat (B8)

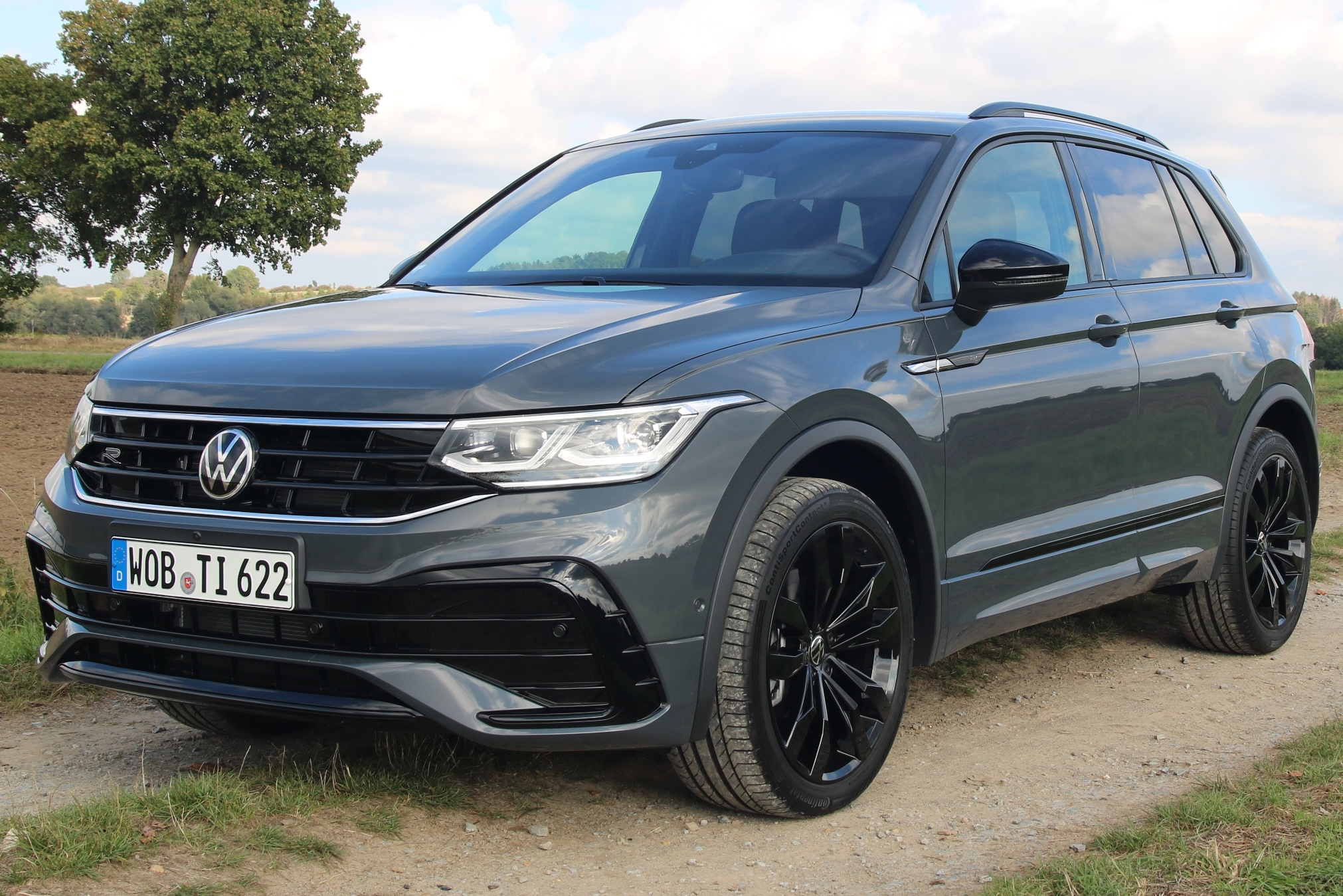
Volkswagen Tiguan

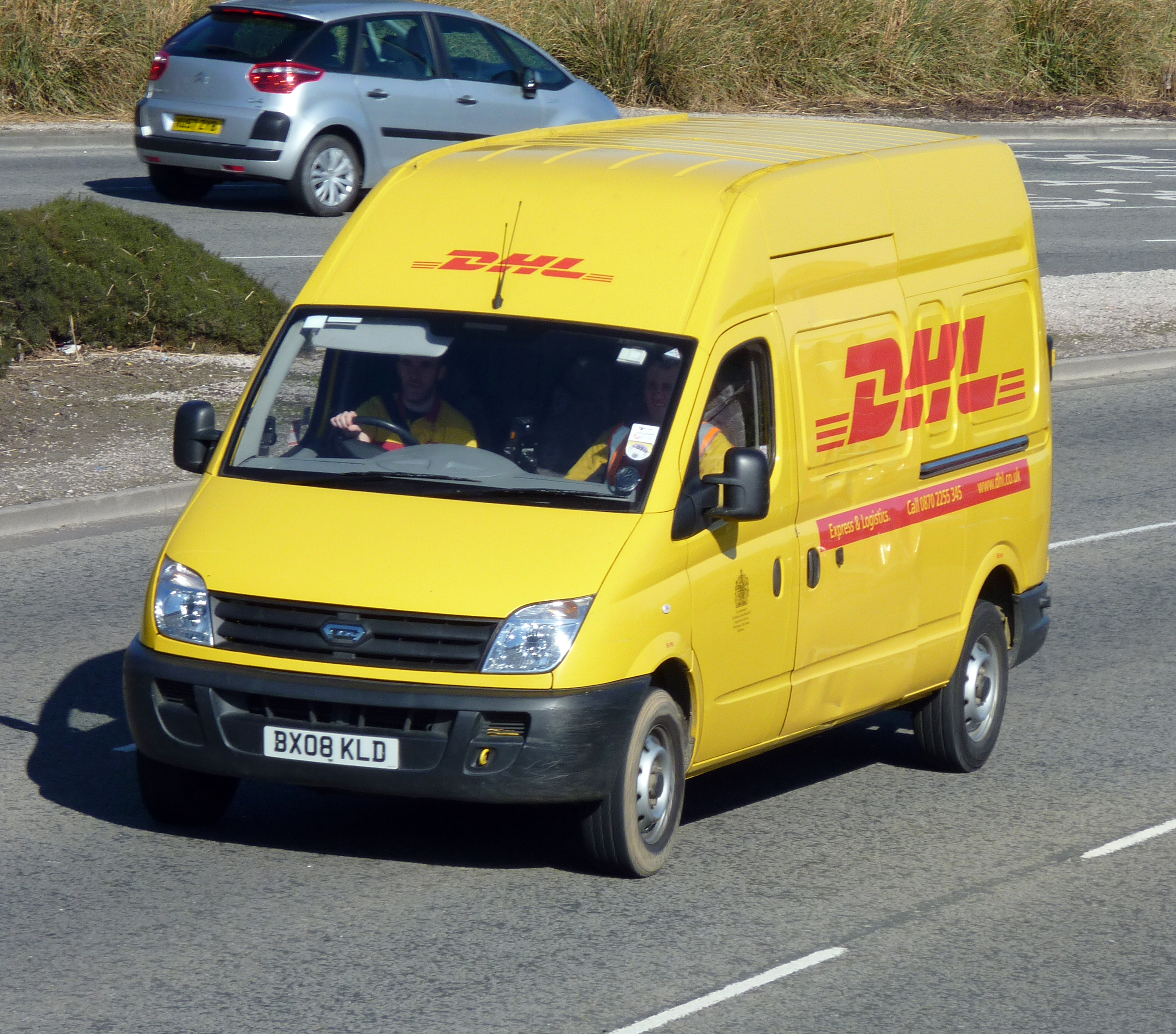
Weststar LDV

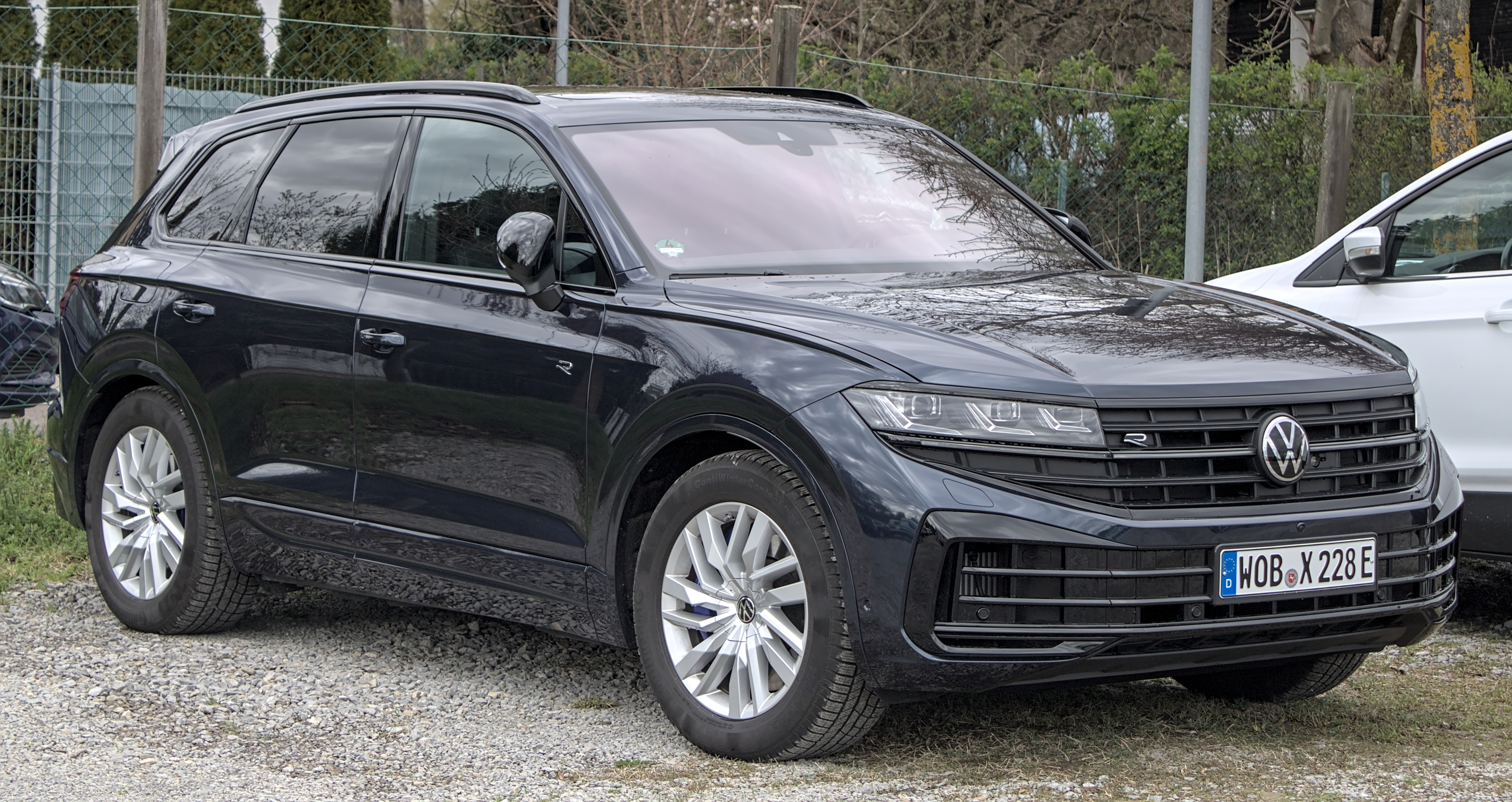
Volkswagen Touareg
