= Alam Flora =

Solid waste management company in Malaysia

Alam Flora Sdn. Bhd.
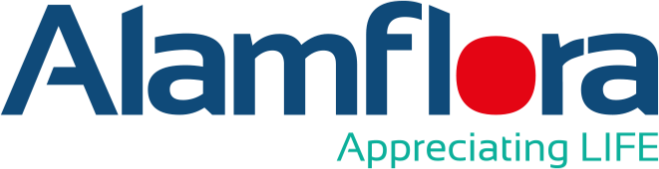
- Type: Private
- Industry: Sanitation, waste management
- Founded: 1995; 31 years ago
- Headquarters: Shah Alam, Selangor, Malaysia
- Area served: Nationwide
- Key people: Tan Sri Abu Kassim Bin Mohamed (Chairman); Badrulhisyam Fauzi (Covering CEO); Rohafizah Ismail (CFO)
- Parent: Malakoff (current)
- Website: www.alamflora.com.my

Alam Flora Sdn Bhd (stylised as Alamflora) is a Malaysian solid waste management and public cleansing privatisation state-owned enterprise. Established in 1995 under the Malaysian government as a wholly owned subsidiary of DRB-HICOM, a Malaysian infrastructure conglomerate, the company was sold in 2019 to Malakoff.

== Background ==
Alam Flora provides waste management services to concession areas in certain regions of Peninsular Malaysia, the Federal Territory of Kuala Lumpur, Putrajaya and Pahang working to manage and reduce waste with minimal environmental impact in Malaysia. It averages 1.01 million tonnes of waste annually. A substantial percentage of this waste comes from cleaning where covered and open drains, beaches, highways, main roads, side and back lanes are manually and mechanically cleaned. The company has ISO 9001 and ISO 14001 certification.

== History ==
In June 2011, the Selangor State Government filed a counter-suit against Alam Flora, following the company's action to file a judicial review to challenge the state government's decision to ask all local authorities to take over the clean-up work in the state. Beginning 16 October 2011, Alam Flora stopped providing cleaning of public places and collection of solid waste in Selangor. The move was made following the state government's decision to take over the service.

The company introduced the green concept cleaning equipment in conjunction with the 2017 SEA Games. It was one of the initiatives in line to raise public awareness on environmental care and sustainable solid waste management.

In August 2018, DRB-HICOM announced a proposal to sell its entire 97.37% stake in Alam Flora to Malakoff Corporation Berhad for approximately RM944.6 million.
