= Malakoff (power company) =

Independent power and water producer based in Malaysia

Malakoff Corporation Berhad
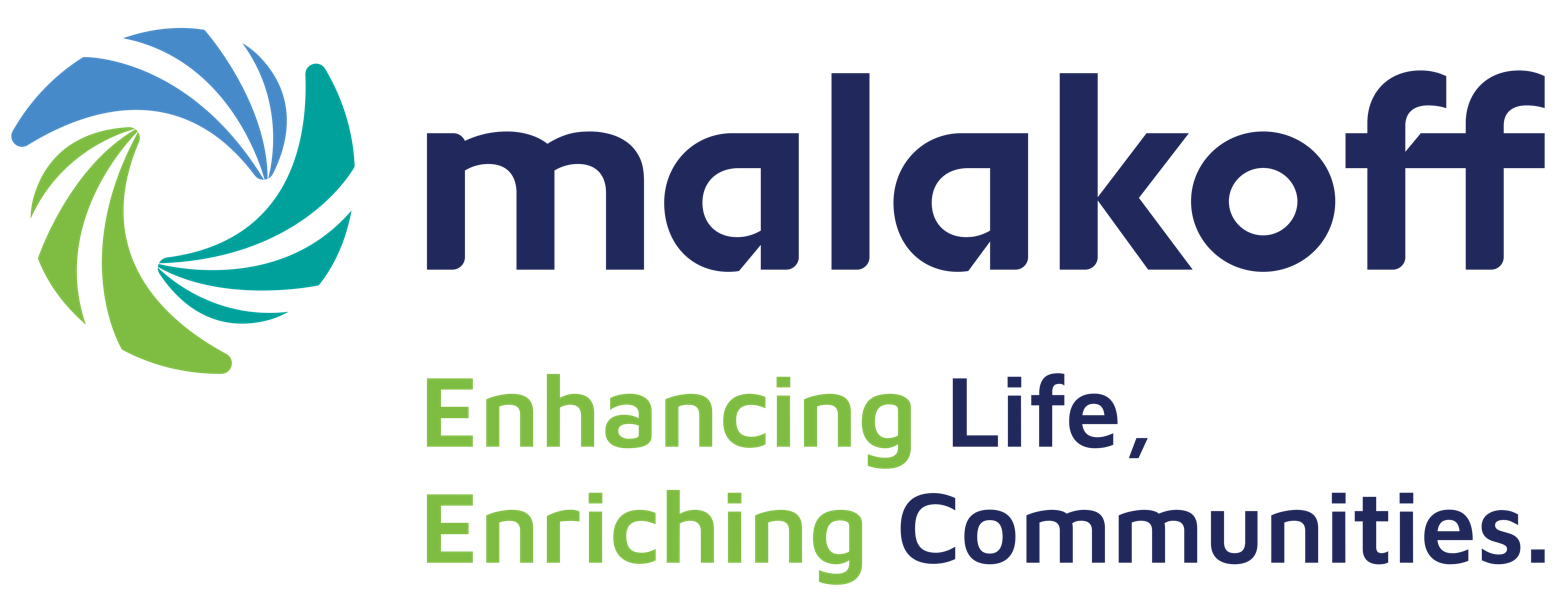
- Company type: Public limited company
- Traded as: MYX: 5264
- ISIN: MYL5264OO006
- Industry: Power
- Founded: 9 October 1975
- Headquarters: Kuala Lumpur, Malaysia
- Number of locations: 6 power stations
- Area served: Malaysia, Saudi Arabia, Bahrain, Oman
- Key people: Syahrunizam Samsudin (Group Chief Executive Officer)
- Products: Electricity; Water
- Revenue: ▲RM$7.42 billion (FY 2019)
- Net income: ▲RM$320.15 million (FY 2019)
- Total assets: ▼RM$26.56 billion (FY 2019)
- Number of employees: 994
- Subsidiaries: Malakoff Power Berhad, Teknik Janakuasa Sdn Bhd, Berhad, Malakoff Utilities Sdn Bhd, Malakoff Engineering Sdn Bhd, Alam Flora Sdn Bhd
- Website: www.malakoff.com.my

Malakoff Corporation Berhad (MYX: 5264) ("Malakoff") is an independent water and power producer (“IWPP”) with core focus on power generation, water desalination, operation & maintenance and waste management and environmental services. In Malaysia, Malakoff is the largest independent power producer (“IPP”) with a net generating capacity of 5,822 MW from its six power plants.

International assets include power and water ventures in Saudi Arabia, Bahrain and Oman, with an effective capacity of 588 MW of power and 472,975 m^{3}/day of water desalination. Malakoff is also actively looking to venture further in the fast growing Middle East and North African region as well as the South-East Asian markets.

Through its wholly owned subsidiary, Teknik Janakuasa Sdn Bhd, Malakoff has involvements in operation & maintenance services locally and in Saudi Arabia, Algeria, Kuwait, Oman and Indonesia.

In 2019 Malakoff completed the acquisition of a 97.37% interest in waste management company Alam Flora Sdn Bhd from DRB-Hicom for RM869 million.

Malakoff is a member of the MMC Group.

== Power generation capacity ==
Malakoff generates electricity mainly from two major types of plant; steam turbine thermal plants and gas turbine plants.

The company owns and operates the following power plants:

- SEV Power Plant in Segari, Perak with 1,303 MW capacity. Malakoff has 93.75% equity interest in the plant owner Segari Energy Ventures Sdn. Bhd. (SEV).
- GB3 Power Plant in Segari, Perak with 640 MW; with 75% equity in plant owner GB3 Sdn. Bhd.
- Prai Power Plant, Butterworth, Pulau Pinang, with 350 MW; held through its wholly owned subsidiary, Prai Power Sdn. Bhd.
- Tanjung Bin Power Plant, Tanjung Bin, Johor with 2,100 MW; with 90% share in plant owner Tanjung Bin Power Sdn. Bhd.
- Tanjung Bin Energy Power Plant, Tanjung Bin, Johor with 1,000 MW; held through its wholly owned subsidiary, Tanjung Bin Energy Sdn. Bhd.
- Kapar Power Plant, Kapar, Selangor - a 2,420 MW coal, oil and gas-fired plant, with a 40% share (associate power plant in which Malakoff has equity. The capacity of these plant is listed under the majority shareholder.)

The company's total effective generation capacity is 5,822 MW.

== See also ==
- National Grid, Malaysia
- Tenaga Nasional
