= List of power stations in Malaysia =

Malaysia Power Stations

Location of power stations in Malaysia
gas, hydroelectric, coal, wind / solar / biomass, cities

== Hydropower ==
Plant	State	Scheme	Coordinates	MW	Owner/operator	Status	Refs
Sultan Azlan Shah Bersia Power Station	Perak	Sungai Perak	5°25'51.1"N 101°12'33.3"E	72	Tenaga Nasional	Active	
Chenderoh Power Station	Perak	Sungai Perak	4°57′38″N 100°58′39″E	40.5	Tenaga Nasional	Active	
Sultan Azlan Shah Kenering Power Station	Perak	Sungai Perak	5°25'47.9"N 101°12'33.2"E	120	Tenaga Nasional	Active	
Sungai Piah Upper Power Station	Perak	Sungai Perak	5°5′25″N 101°17′24″E	14.6	Tenaga Nasional	Active	
Sungai Piah Lower Power Station	Perak	Sungai Perak	5°6′13″N 101°12′42″E	54	Tenaga Nasional	Active	
Temenggor Power Station	Perak	Sungai Perak	5°24'20.4"N 101°17'54.7"E	348	Tenaga Nasional	Active	
Sultan Mahmud	Terengganu	Sungai Terengganu	5°1′25″N 102°54′36″E	400	Tenaga Nasional	Active	
Pergau Dam	Kelantan	Sungai Pergau	5°37′30″N 101°42′11″E	600	Tenaga Nasional	Active	
Sultan Yusof Jor Power Station	Pahang	Cameron Highlands	4°21′4″N 101°20′20″E	100	Tenaga Nasional	Active	
Ulu Jelai Power Station	Pahang	Cameron Highlands	4°27′1″N 101°35′7″E	372	Tenaga Nasional	Active	
Sultan Idris Woh Power Station	Pahang	Cameron Highlands	4°14′15″N 101°19′32″E	150	Tenaga Nasional	Active	
Odak Power Station	Pahang	Cameron Highlands	4°13′43″N 101°19′28″E	4.2	Tenaga Nasional	Active	
SJ Hulu Terengganu	Terengganu	Sungai Terengganu	5°09′06.2″N 102°36′26.1″E	250	Tenaga Nasional	Active	
SJ Tembat	Terengganu	Sungai Terengganu	5°12′36.4″N 102°35′13.7″E	15	Tenaga Nasional	Active	
Habu Power Station	Pahang	Cameron Highlands	4°26′34″N 101°23′13″E	5.5	Tenaga Nasional	Active	
Kampong Raja Power Station	Pahang	Cameron Highlands		0.8			
Kuala Terla Power Station	Pahang	Cameron Highlands	4°33′16.4″N 101°24′41.4″E	0.5	Tenaga Nasional		
Robinson Falls Power Station	Pahang	Cameron Highlands	4°27′28.5″N 101°23′23.8″E	0.9	Tenaga Nasional		
Bakun Dam	Sarawak	Batang Balui	2°45'39.9"N 114°03'26.3"E	2520	Sarawak Energy	Active	
Batang Ai Dam	Sarawak	Sungai Batang Ai	1°08'49.5"N 111°52'27.2"E	100	Sarawak Energy	Active	
Murum Dam	Sarawak	Sungai Murum	2°38'57.0"N 114°22'03.3"E	944	Sarawak Energy	Active	
Tenom Pangi Dam	Sabah	Sungai Tenom	5°06'55.6"N 115°54'43.7"E	66	Sabah Electricity	Active	

=== Peninsular Malaysia ===
Tenaga Nasional Berhad operates three hydroelectric schemes in the peninsula with an installed generating capacity of 1,911 megawatts (MW). They are the Sungai Perak, Terengganu and Cameron Highlands hydroelectric schemes with 21 dams in operation. A number of independent power producers also own and operate several small hydro plants.

Independent hydroelectric schemes

- Sg Kenerong Small Hydro Power Station in Kelantan at Sungai Kenerong, 20 MW, owned by Musteq Hydro Sdn Bhd, a subsidiary of Eden Inc Berhad

== Gas-fired ==
List of gas-fired plants in Malaysia
Plant	State	Coordinates	MW	Type	Owner/operator	Status	Refs
Connaught Bridge Power Station	Selangor at Klang	3°2′37″N 101°28′7″E	375	Combined cycle (1 ST, 1 GT)	Tenaga Nasional Berhad	Active	
Gelugor Power Station	Penang at Gelugor	5°22′49″N 100°18′53″E	310	Combined cycle (2 GT + 1 ST) and 2 GT	Tenaga Nasional Berhad	Expired	
Kuala Langat Power Plant	Selangor at Kuala Langat	2°47′53″N 101°38′55″E	720	Combined cycle (5 GT + 1 ST)	Edra Power Holdings Sdn. Bhd.	Active	
Teluk Salut Power Station	Sabah at KKIP, Sepanggar	6°5′33.21″N 116°9′49.02″E	190	Combined Cycle (4 GT + 2 ST)	Ranhill Powertron Sdn Bhd, a subsidiary of Ranhill Utilities Berhad		
Rugading Power Station	Sabah at KKIP, Sepanggar	6°5′38.2″N 116°9′56.4″E	190	Combined Cycle (2 GT + 1 ST)	Ranhill Sabah Energy II Sdn Bhd, a subsidiary of Ranhill Utilities Berhad		
Lumut GB3 Power Station	Perak at Pantai Remis	4°23′32″N 100°35′20″E	651	Combined cycle (1 ST), open cycle (3 GT)	GB3 Sdn Bhd, a subsidiary of Malakoff	Expired	
Lumut Power Station	Perak at Pantai Remis	4°23′27″N 100°35′22″E	1,303	Combined cycle (6 GT, 2 ST)	Segari Energy Ventures Sdn Bhd, a subsidiary of Malakoff	Active	
Nur Generation Plants	Kedah in Kulim High-Tech Industrial Park	5°25′50″N 100°35′55″E	220	Combined cycle (4 GT, 2 ST)	Nur Generation Sdn Bhd	Active	
Paka Power Station	Terengganu at Paka	4°36′4″N 103°26′57″E	808	Combined cycle (4 GT, 2 ST)	YTL Power International Berhad	Expired	
Southern Power Generation Sdn Bhd	Johor at Pasir Gudang	1°27′2″N 103°52′48″E	1,440	Combined cycle (2 GT, 1ST)	Tenaga Nasional Berhad	Active	
Petronas Gas Centralised Utilities Facilities (CUF)	Pahang (Gebeng-Kerteh)	3°59′23″N 103°22′16″E	324	Cogen(9 GT)	Petronas Gas Berhad	Active	
Port Dickson Power Station	Negeri Sembilan in Port Dickson	2°33′13″N 101°47′57″E	440	Open cycle (4 GT)	Malakoff Berhad	Expired	
Prai Power Station	Penang at Perai	5°22′31″N 100°22′23″E	1071	Combined cycle (2 GT, 1ST)	Tenaga Nasional Berhad	Active	
Putrajaya Power Station	Selangor at Serdang	2°57′56″N 101°41′5″E	252	Open cycle (2 GT)	Tenaga Nasional Berhad	Expired	
Miri Power Station	Sarawak at Pujut	4°25′20.57″N 114°1′04.48″E	112	Open cycle (6 GT)	Sarawak Power Generation Sdn Bhd, a subsidiary of Sarawak Energy Berhad	Active	
Sarawak Power Generation Plant	Sarawak at Bintulu	3°17′15.7″N 113°5′32.0″E	515	Open cycle (2 GT)	Sarawak Power Generation Sdn Bhd, a subsidiary of Sarawak Energy Berhad		
Sepanggar Bay Power Plant	Sabah at Kota Kinabalu Industrial Park	6°5′27.89″N 116°9′58.5″E	100	Combined cycle	Sepangar Bay Power Corporation Sdn Bhd		
Pasir Gudang Energy	Johor at Pasir Gudang	1°26′58″N 103°52′51″E	729	Thermal (2 ST), combined cycle (2 GT, 1 ST), open cycle (2 GT)	Tenaga Nasional Berhad	Expired	
Sultan Ismail Power Station	Terengganu at Paka	4°35′50″N 103°27′3″E	1,136	Combined cycle (8 GT, 4 ST)	Tenaga Nasional Berhad	Expired	
Tanjung Kling Power Station	Malacca at Tanjung Kling	2°13′24″N 102°9′7″E	330	Combined cycle (2 GT, 1 ST)	Pahlawan Power, a subsidiary of Powertek	Expired	
Telok Gong Power Station 1	Malacca at Telok Gong	2°20′51″N 102°3′6″E	440	Open cycle (4 GT)	Powertek	Expired	
Telok Gong Power Station 2	Malacca at Telok Gong	2°20′51″N 102°3′6″E	720	Combined cycle (2 GT, 1ST)	Panglima Power, a subsidiary of Powertek	Expired	
Teknologi Tenaga Perlis Consortium	Perlis at Kuala Sungai Baru	6°20′22″N 100°9′17″E	650	Combined cycle	Teknologi Tenaga Perlis Consortium Sdn Bhd / Global E-Technic Sdn Bhd	Expired	
Tuanku Jaafar Power Station	Negeri Sembilan at Port Dickson	2°31′59″N 101°47′29″E	1,411	Combined cycle (4 GT, 2 ST)	Tenaga Nasional Berhad	Active	
Edra Melaka Power Plant	Malacca at Kuala Sungai Baru	2°21′3″N 102°3′6″E	2,242	Combined cycle (3GT,3ST) single shaft	Edra Power Holdings Sdn. Bhd.	Active	
Pulau Indah Power Plant (PIPP)	Selangor at Pulau Indah	2°53′36.53″N 101°17′35.15″E	1,200	Combined cycle (2 GT) single shaft	Pulau Indah Power Plant Sdn. Bhd.	Active	

Note: GT – gas turbine unit(s); ST – steam turbine unit(s).

== Coal-fired (or combined gas/coal) ==
List of coal-fired plants in Malaysia
Plant	State	Coordinates	MW	Type	Owner/operator	Status	Refs
Balingian Coal-Fired Power Plant	Sarawak at Mukah	2°44′25.11″N 112°28′31.29″E	600	Thermal (2 ST) - CFB	Sarawak Energy	Active	
Jimah Power Plant	Negri Sembilan at Lukut	2°35′11″N 101°43′21″E	1,400	Thermal (2 ST)	Jimah Energy Ventures Sdn Bhd, a subsidiary of CGN Edra	Active	
Stesen Janakuasa Tuanku Muhriz	Negri Sembilan at Lukut	2°35′11″N 101°43′21″E	2,000	Thermal (2 ST)	Jimah East Power Sdn. Bhd., a subsidiary of Tenaga Nasional Berhad	Active	
Stesen Janakuasa Sultan Azlan Shah	Perak at Manjung	4°9′44″N 100°38′48″E	4,100	Thermal (5 ST)	TNB Janamanjung Sdn Bhd, a subsidiary of Tenaga Nasional Berhad	Active	
Mukah Coal-Fired Power Plant	Sarawak at Mukah	2°58′11″N 112°19′21.1″E	270	Thermal (2 ST)	Mukah Power Generation Sdn Bhd, a subsidiary of Sarawak Energy Berhad	Active	
PPLS Power Generation Plant	Sarawak at Kuching	1°33′36.2″N 110°23′32.4″E	110	Thermal (2 ST)	PPLS Power Generation, a subsidiary of Sarawak Energy Berhad		
Sejingkat Coal-Fired Power Plant	Sarawak at Kuching	1°38′14.4″N 110°27′54″E	210	Thermal (4 ST)	Sejingkat Power Corporation Sdn Bhd, a subsidiary of Sarawak Energy Berhad	Active	
Sultan Salahuddin Abdul Aziz Shah Power Station	Selangor at Kapar	3°7′1″N 101°19′1″E	2,420	Thermal (6 ST), open cycle (2 GT), natural gas and coal with oil backup	Kapar Energy Ventures Sdn Bhd, a subsidiary of Tenaga Nasional Berhad	Active	
Tanjung Bin Power Station	Johor at Pontian	1°20′3″N 103°32′55″E	2,244	Thermal (3 × 748 MW ST)	Tanjung Bin Power Sdn Bhd, a subsidiary of Malakoff	Active	
Tanjung Bin Energy Station	Johor at Pontian	1°20′3″N 103°32′55″E	1,000	Thermal (1 × 1000 MW ST)	Tanjung Bin Energy Sdn Bhd, a subsidiary of Malakoff	Active	

Note: ST – steam turbine unit(s).

== Cogeneration ==
List of Cogeneration-plants in Malaysia
Plant	State	Coordinates	MW	Type	Owner/operator	Status	Refs
Pengerang Power	Pengerang at Klang		600		Petronas	Active	

== Oil-fired ==
List of oil-fired plants in Malaysia
Plant	State	Coord.	MW	Type	Owner/operator	Status	Refs
Melawa Power Station	Sabah in Melawa		50	4 diesel engines	ARL Tenaga Sdn Bhd		
Sandakan Power Corporation Plant	Sabah at Sandakan		34	4 diesel engines	Sandakan Power Corporation Sdn Bhd		
Stratavest Power Station	Sabah at Sandakan		60	4 diesel engines	Stratavest Sdn Bhd		
Tawau Power Plant	Sabah at Tawau		36	3 diesel engines	Serudong Power Sdn Bhd		

== Biomass ==
List of biomass plants in Malaysia
Plant/owner/operator	State	Coord.	MW	Type	Fuel	Status	Refs
Bumibiopower Sdn Bhd (planning approved 2001)	Perak at Pantai Remis		6	Steam turbines	Empty fruit bunch		
Jana Landfill Sdn Bhd	Selangor at Seri Kembangan		2	Gas turbines	Biogas		
TSH Bio Energy Sdn Bhd	Sabah at Tawau		14	Steam turbines	Empty fruit bunch		
Potensi Gaya Sdn Bhd (planning approved 2003)	Sabah at Tawau		7	Steam turbines	Empty fruit bunch		
Alaff Ekspresi Sdn Bhd (planning approved 2003)	Sabah at Tawau		8	Steam turbines	Empty fruit bunch		
Naluri Ventures Sdn Bhd (license ended in 2010)	Johor at Pasir Gudang		12	Steam turbines	Empty fruit bunch		
Seguntor Bioenergy Sdn Bhd (planning approved 2007)	Sabah at Sandakan		11.5	Steam turbines	Empty fruit bunch		
Kina Biopower Sdn Bhd (planning approved 2007)	Sabah at Sandakan		11.5	Steam turbines	Empty fruit bunch		
Recycle Energy Sdn Bhd (commercial operation 2009)	Selangor at Semenyih		8.9	Steam turbine	Refuse-derived fuel		
FTJ Bio Power Sdn Bhd (Jengka Advance Renewable Energy Plant)	Pahang at Maran		12	Steam turbines	Empty fruit bunch		

== Hybrid power stations ==
Pulau Perhentian Kecil, Terengganu with a combined capacity of 650 kilowatts

- Two 100 kW wind turbines
- One 100 kW solar panels
- Two diesel generators capable of 200 and 150 kW respectively

== Under construction ==
- 1,285 MW Baleh Hydroelectric Power Plant - Kapit, Sarawak
- 300MW Nenggiri Hydroelectric Power Plant - Gua Musang, Kelantan
- 500MW Miri CCGT Power Plant - Lutong, Sarawak

== See also ==
- Energy policy of Malaysia
- National Grid, Malaysia
