= Electricity sector in Malaysia =

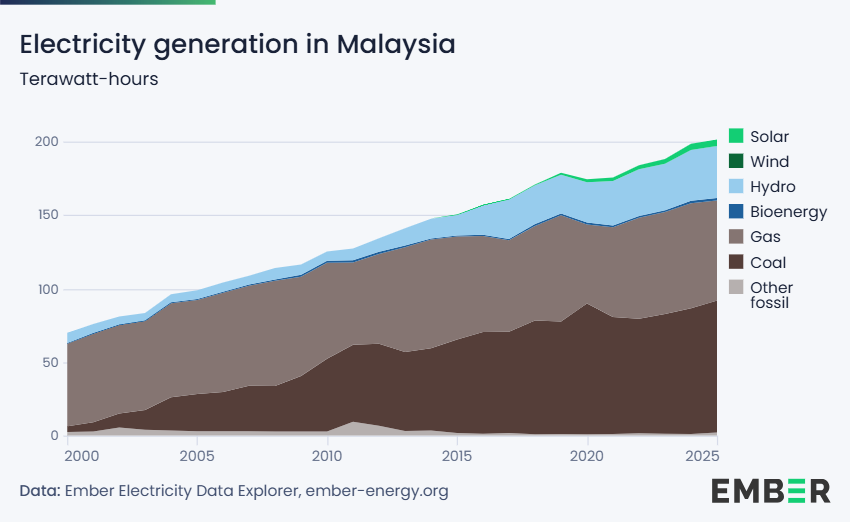
Electricity generation in Malaysia in terawatt-hours

The electricity sector in Malaysia strictly comprises three separate systems, each with their own generation, transmission and distribution networks: one for Peninsular Malaysia, one for Sabah and the adjacent Federal Territory of Labuan, and one for Sarawak.

== Generation ==
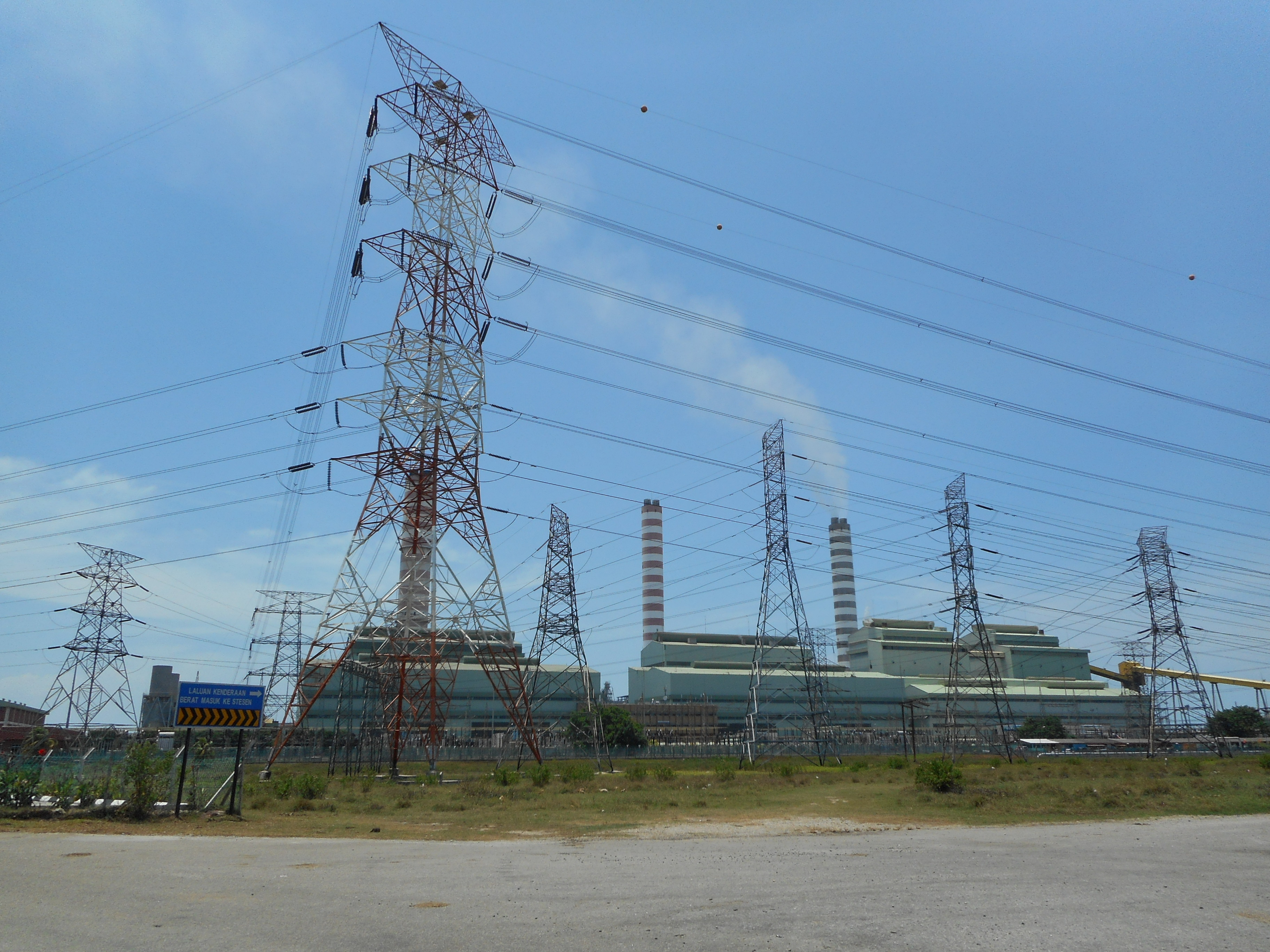
2,420 MW Sultan Salahuddin Abdul Aziz Power Station in Selangor.

The Malaysian electricity market currently operates as a monopsony (i.e. a "single-buyer market"): utilities are the only bodies permitted to transmit and distribute electricity to end-users (i.e. the only "buyers"). While utilities can operate power plants directly, privately owned "Independent Power Producers" (IPPs) can also enter into long-term supply contracts with their respective utilities. Currently, this occurs in Peninsular Malaysia as well as in Sabah/Labuan: all generation capacity in Sarawak is controlled by Sarawak Energy.

In Peninsular Malaysia, since 2012, the single buyer has been the Single Buyer Department, a ring-fenced unit of Tenaga Nasional that also manages all cross-border imports and exports of electricity.

As of December 2024, Peninsular Malaysia has 26,152MW of electrical generation capacity, with an estimated "energy reserve" of 24% (i.e. capacity kept "in reserve" in the event of disruption of generation supply). Of this, approximately 51% of generation capacity is operated by TNB directly, 38% by privately owned IPPs, and the remaining 14% in power plants jointly owned by TNB and IPPs.

The Malaysian electricity market had historically operated as a monopoly, with all generation, transmission and distribution operations run by the above utilities (Tenaga Nasional for Peninsular Malaysia, Sarawak Energy for Sarawak and Sabah Electricity for Sabah and Labuan). However, rapid economic growth and a spate of high-profile power outages in the 1990s led to the introduction of private generators for the first time, ostensibly to allow for rapid increases in generation capacity.

Under this model, private enterprises would build power stations as "Independent Power Producers," in return for long-term supply contracts with TNB. These contracts were negotiated directly between the Economic Planning Unit of then-Prime Minister Dr. Mahathir Mohamad's office and private enterprises, with no involvement from TNB. Five private companies were awarded contracts to supply up to 30% of Malaysia's generation capacity through these contracts:

- Genting Sanyen (controlled by Lim Goh Tong)
- YTL Corporation (controlled by Yeoh Tiong Lay)
- Segari Energy (a unit of MRCB)
- Powertek (controlled by Ananda Krishnan)
- Port Dickson Power (controlled by MRCB, Sime Darby and Malakoff)

Bidding companies were understood to have been offered highly lucrative contracts: including that electricity was to be purchased at a fixed (above-market rate) price by TNB, and IPPs were promised a minimum profit margin (as the price of fuel was to be fixed, with any fluctuation above that to be paid by TNB). Then-TNB chairman Ani Arope was highly critical of the arrangements, claiming in an interview with Malaysiakini that the price paid to YTL Power (16sen/kWh) was double what it cost TNB to generate it themselves (8sen/kWh); with an additional "take-or-pay" conditions bringing the cost up to 23sen/kWh if TNB did not purchase a minimum quantity of electricity from YTL. While the closed bidding process and lucrative contracts sparked criticism of crony capitalism, these were never able to be publicly verified as the contracts were classified under the Official Secrets Act 1972.

=== Power generation ===
As of 2024, Peninsular Malaysia's electricity generation mix comprises coal (49%), natural gas (42%) hydropower (5%), and solar power (5%, evenly distributed between grid and distributed systems).

== Regulators ==
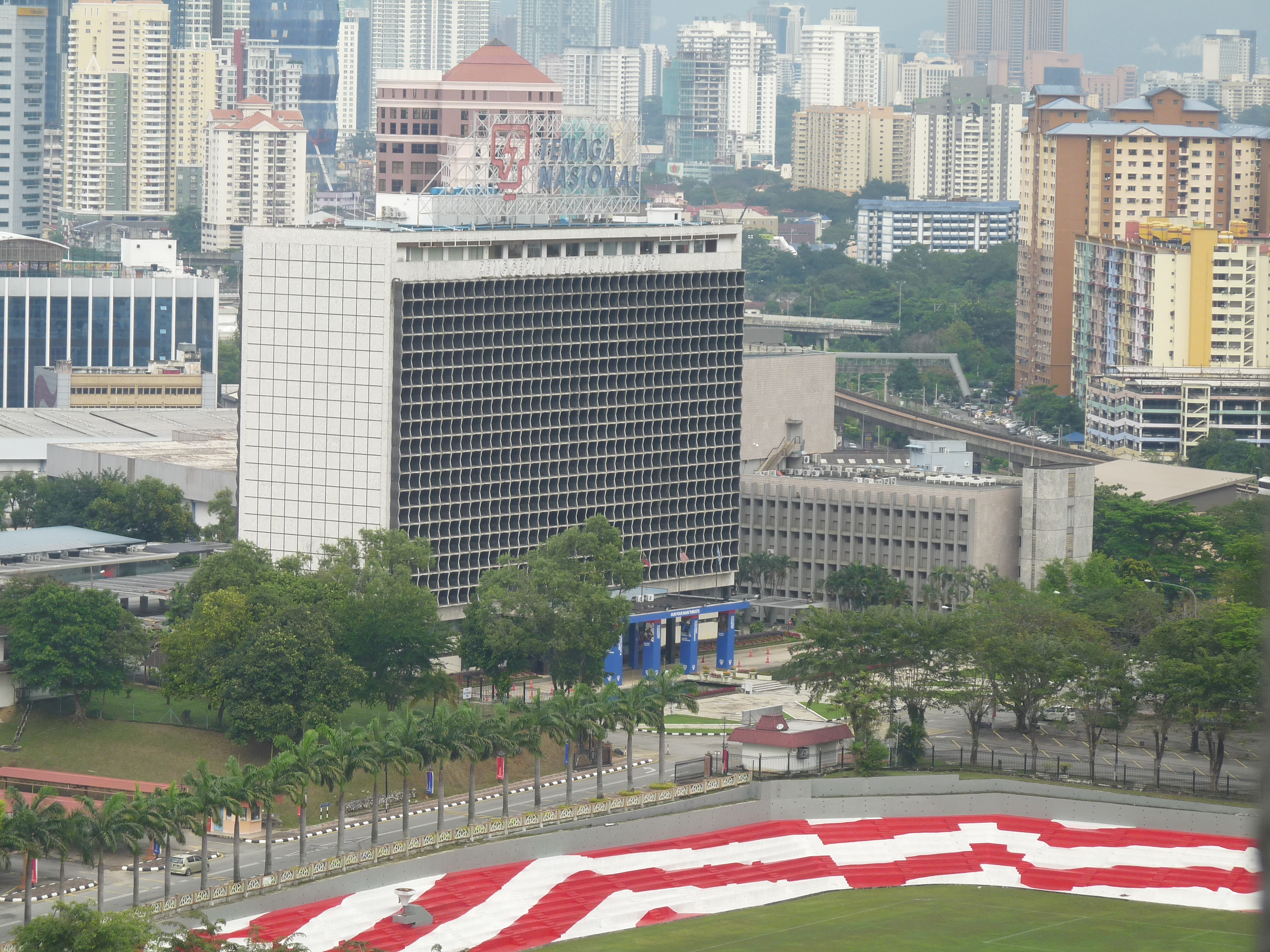
Tenaga Nasional headquarters office in Kuala Lumpur.

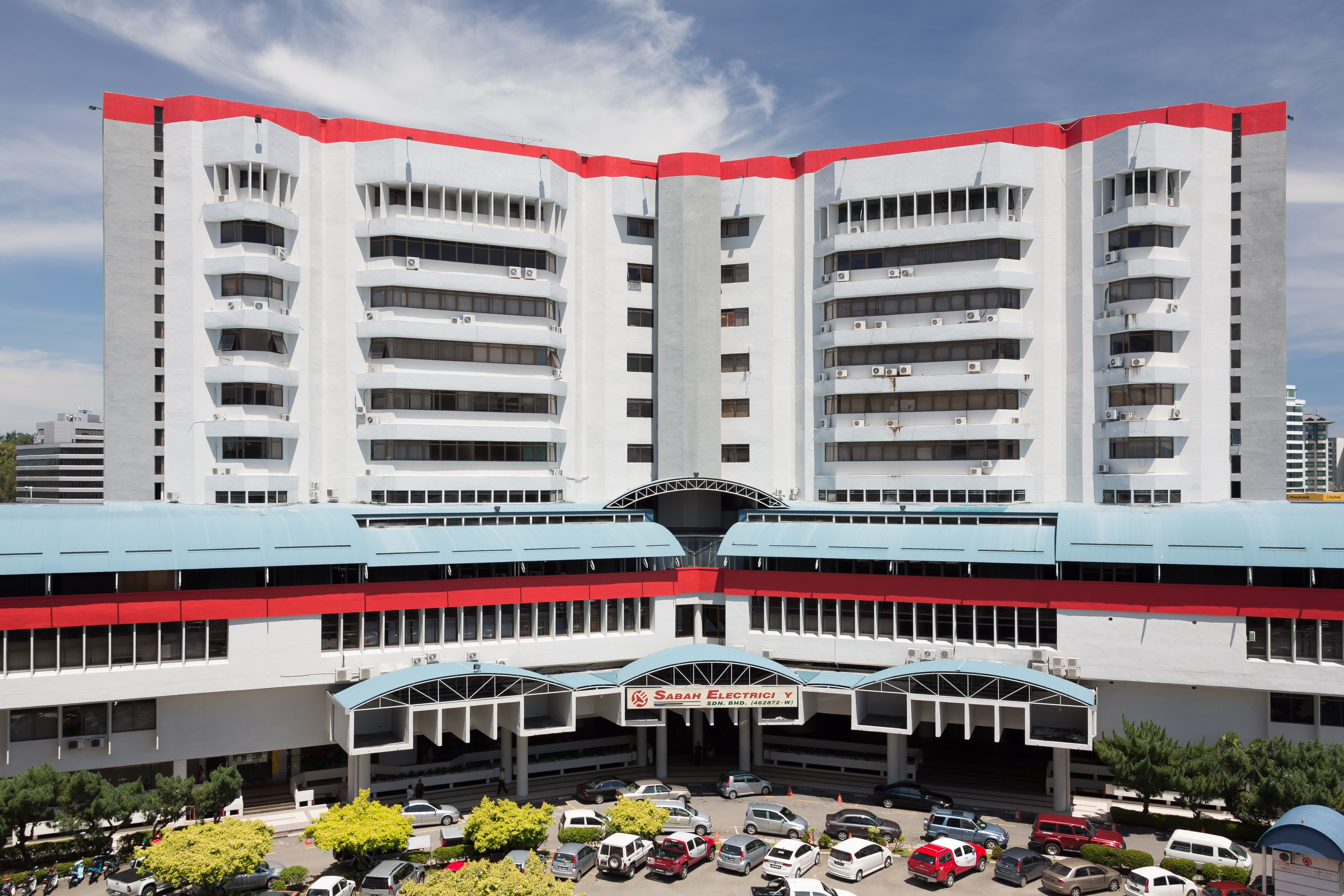
Sabah Electricity headquarters office in Sabah.

At a policy level, the electricity sector in Malaysia mainly falls under the purview of the Ministry of Energy Transition and Water Transformation (PETRA), with some functions taken up by the Energy Division of the Ministry of Economy.

The Malaysian electricity market is regulated by the Energy Commission (ST).

Most generation capacity, as well as all grid transmission and end-consumer electricity distribution, is managed by three companies:

- Tenaga Nasional (TNB) for Peninsular Malaysia (publicly listed on Bursa Malaysia)
- Sarawak Energy for Sarawak (owned by the Government of Sarawak)
- Sabah Electricity for Sabah and Labuan (80% owned by Tenaga Nasional, and 20% by the Government of Sabah)

== Transmission and distribution ==
=== Interconnection ===
Power grid in Malaysia is interconnected to Singapore and Thailand.

== Load ==
=== Peak load ===
The peak load in Peninsular Malaysia in 2014 was 16,901 MW.

== See also ==
- Energy policy of Malaysia
