= Energy policy of Malaysia =

Energy consumption by source, Malaysia

The energy policy of Malaysia is determined by the Malaysian Government, which address issues of energy production, distribution, and consumption. The Department of Electricity and Gas Supply acts as the regulator while other players in the energy sector include energy supply and service companies, research and development institutions and consumers. Government-linked companies Petronas and Tenaga Nasional Berhad are major players in Malaysia's energy sector, with natural gas playing an outsized role in energy planning.

Governmental agencies that contribute to the policy are the Ministry of Energy, Green Technology and Water, Energy Commission (Suruhanjaya Tenaga), and the Malaysia Energy Centre (Pusat Tenaga Malaysia). Among the documents that the policy is based on are the 1974 Petroleum Development Act, 1975 National Petroleum Policy, 1980 National Depletion Policy, 1990 Electricity Supply Act, 1993 Gas Supply Acts, 1994 Electricity Regulations, 1997 Gas Supply Regulation and the 2001 Energy Commission Act.

== Policy overview ==
Malaysia's oil production no longer fulfills its needs.

Energy policy is the responsibility of the Office of the Prime Minister, specifically the Economic Planning Unit and the Implementation and Coordination Unit. The Ministry of Energy, Green Technology and Water has identified three principal energy objectives that would be instrumental in guiding the development of its energy sector.

=== Supply ===
To ensure the provision of adequate, secure and cost-effective energy supplies through developing indigenous energy resources both non-renewable and renewable energy resources using the latest cost options and diversification of supply sources both from within and outside the country.

In pursuit of the supply objective, policy initiatives, particularly with respect to crude oil and natural gas, Malaysia have aimed at both extending the life of domestic non-renewable energy resources, as well as diversification away from oil dependence to include other forms of energy sources.

Oil production peaked in 2016, with large and shallow oil fields having matured. Malaysia has cooperated with OPEC to reduce production in times of global slumps.

=== Utilisation ===
To promote the efficient utilisation of energy and discourage wasteful and non-productive patterns of energy consumption.

The policy's approach to realise this objective is to rely heavily on the energy industry and consumers to exercise efficiency in energy production, transportation, energy conversion, utilisation and consumption through the implementation of awareness programs. Demand side management initiatives by the utilities, particularly through tariff incentives, have had some impact on efficient utilisation and consumption.

Government initiatives to encourage cogeneration are also aimed at promoting an efficient method for generating heat energy and electricity from a single energy source.

=== Environmental ===
To minimise the negative impacts of energy production, transportation, conversion, utilisation and consumption on the environment.

The environment objective has seen limited policy initiatives in the past. All major energy development projects are subjected to the mandatory environmental impact assessment requirement. Environmental consequences, such as emissions, discharges and noise are subjected to the environmental quality standards like air quality and emission standards.

== Renewable energy policy ==
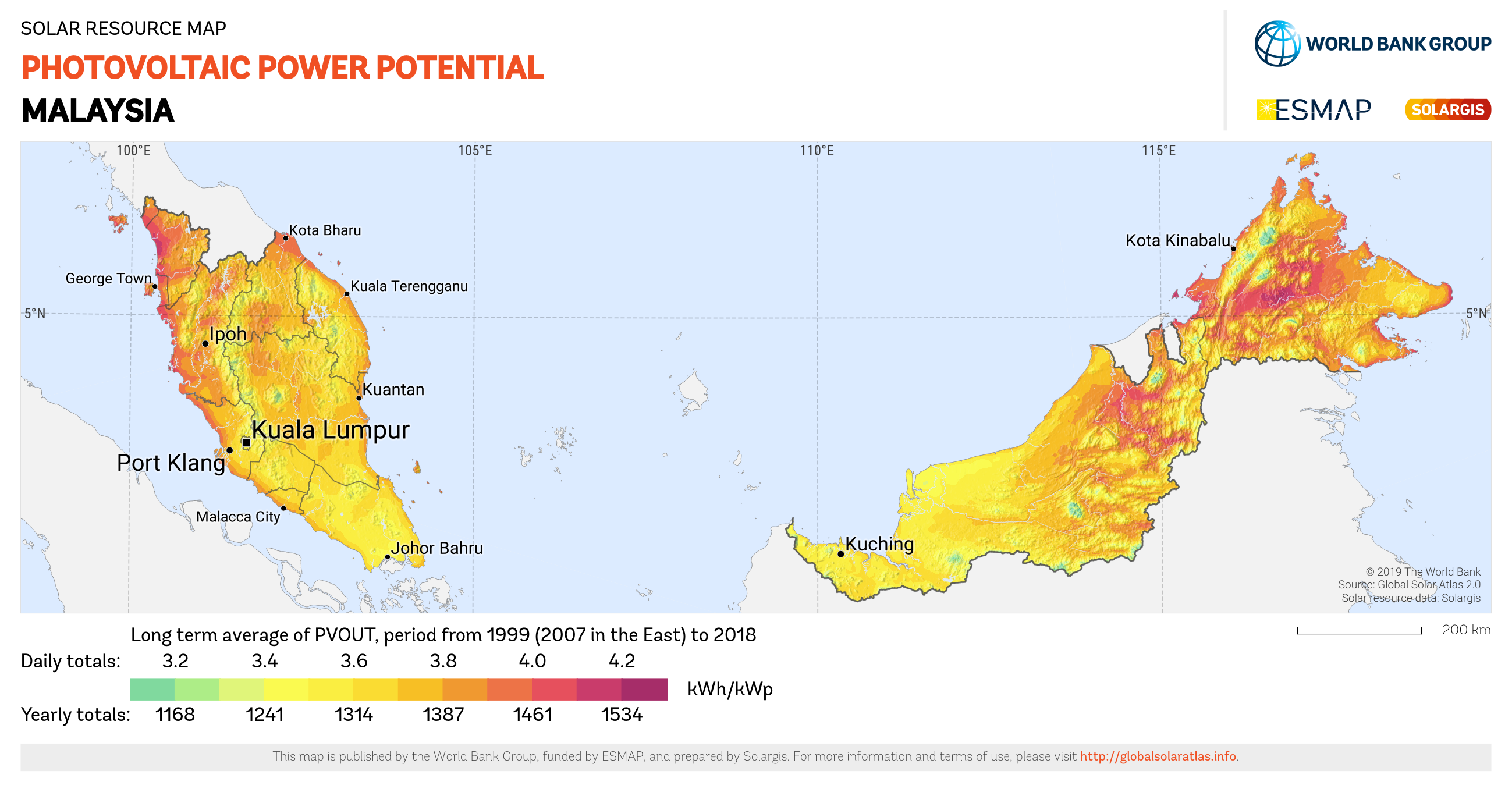
Malaysia has high photovoltaic power potential, meaning it is a desirable location for solar power.

The Malaysian government is seeking to intensify the development of renewable energy, particularly biomass, as the 'fifth fuel' resource under the country's Fuel Diversification Policy. The policy, which was set out in 2001, had a target of renewable energy providing 5% of electricity generation by 2005, equal to between 500 and 600 megawatt (MW) of installed capacity. The policy has been reinforced by fiscal incentives, such as investment tax allowances and the Small Renewable Energy Programme (SREP), which encourages the connection of small renewable power generation plants to the national grid. In 2018, Malaysia set a 20% target of renewable energy in the country's energy mix by 2025, an 18% increase from the 2% Malaysia had in 2018. In order to reach the target, the country needs to attract a total of USD 8 billion of investment in renewable energy during this period; for attracting investment the government could improve its renewable energy governance and the investment climate for foreign investors.

The Small Renewable Energy Program allows renewable projects with up to 10 MW of capacity to sell their electricity output to TNB, under 21-year licence agreements. Numerous applications for the program have been received, mainly involving biomass, and of these over half are for palm oil waste. In 2005 there were 28 approved biomass projects involving the installation of 194 MW of grid-connected capacity. There were also four approved landfill gas-based projects, with 9 MW of capacity, and 18 mini hydro-electric projects offering 69.9 MW of total capacity.

In 2013, the Malaysian government announced investment tax allowance of 100 percentage on qualifying capital expenditures. Though QCE calculation was said to be considered for a maximum period of five years. This measure was taken in order to encourage investment in renewable energy sector.

In 2016, the Sustainable Energy Development Authority (SEDA) of Malaysia has conducted a comprehensive onshore wind mapping effort. SEDA Malaysia is a statutory body formed under the Sustainable Energy Development Authority Act of 2011. One of the key roles of the SEDA is to administer and manage the implementation of the Feed-in Tariff (FiT) mechanism, including a Renewable Energy fund mandated under the Renewable Energy Act of 2011. The Renewable Energy fund was created to support the FiT scheme. The current onshore wind mapping exercise will determine whether wind energy should be included in the FiT regime.

As of 2021, Malaysia is one of the major producers of solar panels in the world, but paradoxically it has yet to fully capitalize on this for domestic electricity generation.

== Production and consumption ==
Traditionally, energy production in Malaysia has been based around oil and natural gas. Malaysia currently has 13GW of electrical generation capacity. Power generation capacity connected to the Malaysian National Grid is 19,023 MW, with a maximum demand of 13,340 MW as of July 2007 according to Suruhanjaya Tenaga. Total electricity generation for 2007 is 108,539 GW·h with a total consumption of 97,113 GW·h or 3,570 kW·h per capita. The generation fuel mix is 62.6% gas, 20.9% coal, 9.5% hydro and 7% from other forms of fuel. In 2007, the country as a whole consumes 514 thousand barrels (23.6 million tonnes) of oil daily against a production of 755 thousand barrels (34.2 million tonnes) per day. Oil is generally transported via trucks rather than pipes. In the 21st century the government invested in oil refining, allowing drilled oil to be processed domestically. This has meant that most domestic demand is able to be met without imports.

However, Malaysia only has 33 years of natural gas reserves, and 19 years of oil reserves, whilst the demand for energy is increasing. Due to this the Malaysian government is expanding into renewable energy sources. Currently 16% of Malaysian electricity generation is hydroelectric, the remaining 84% being thermal. The oil and gas industry in Malaysia is currently dominated by state owned Petronas, and the energy sector as a whole is regulated by Suruhanjaya Tenaga, a statutory commission who governs the energy in the peninsula and Sabah, under the terms of the Electricity Commission Act of 2001. Petronas has exclusive ownership rights over oil and gas within Malaysia's territory, although it can license rights to other companies. Revenue from Petronas provides a significant proportion of national government revenue (35% in 2019), and the states of Sabah and Sarawak additionally levy a 5% tax on production within their territory. Sarawak established Petroleum Sarawak Berhad in March 2018, putting it on equal footing with Petronas within their state. Regulatory disputes between the two companies are ongoing. Disputes with Brunei exist over the management of oil and gas fields that cross the border.

=== Peninsular Malaysia historical electricity production and consumption data ===
| Year | Production capacity | | | Maximum demand |
| Year | TNB Production capacity | IPP Production capacity | Total Production capacity | Maximum demand |
|---|---|---|---|---|
| 2005 | 6346 | 11277 | 17623 | 12493 |
| 2006 | 6346 | 11977 | 18323 | 12990 |
| 2007 | 6346 | 13377 | 19723 | 13620 |
| 2008 | 6436 | 13377 | 19723 | 14007 |
| 2009 | 7040 | 14777 | 21817 | 14245 |

All figures are in Megawatts

Source: Suruhanjaya Tenaga (Energy Commission) Annual Report

=== Sabah historical electricity production and consumption data ===
| Year | Production capacity | Maximum demand |
|---|---|---|
| 2005 | 660 | 548 |
| 2006 | 708 | 594 |
| 2007 | 706 | 625 |
| 2008 | 812 | 673 |
| 2009 | 903 | 719 |

All figures are in megawatts

Source: Suruhanjaya Tenaga Annual Report

== Energy efficiency ==
Energy use per person is relatively high in Malaysia compared to other upper-middle-income countries such as Brazil, Turkey or China. In 2015, the transport sector consumed 23,425 kilotonnes of oil equivalent (ktoe), meaning that it was responsible for 45.2% of total energy consumed in Malaysia. It was followed by the industrial sector, which consumed 13,989 ktoe (27.0% of total energy demand); the residential and commercial sectors at 7,559 ktoe (14.6% of total energy demand); non-energy uses such as the manufacture of chemicals at 5,928 ktoe (11.4%) and agriculture accounting for the rest.

The Malaysian Energy Commission has set up various energy efficiency programs. Local governments are also showing leadership on energy efficiency policies: Putrajaya has the aspiration of becoming a "Green City" by 2025, while Iskandar Malaysia has developed a "Low-Carbon Society Blueprint".

There are significant opportunities to improve energy efficiency in urban areas, where 73% of Malaysia's population live. and over 90% of Malaysia's economic activity is conducted. Johor Bahru, for example, could reduce its emissions by a quarter by 2025 through a range of cost-effective investments: switching from diesel to natural gas in the rubber and petrochemical industries, promoting hybrid cars, adopting more ambitious green building standards and introducing mandatory energy performance standards for appliances such as air conditioners. Suruhanjaya Tenaga (the Energy Commission) already have some of these measures in place. For example, the Electricity Regulation 1994 has introduced labelling systems and performance standards for air conditioners, refrigerators, domestic fans and televisions. There are also a range of government schemes for financing building energy retrofits, which have had various levels of effectiveness.

== See also ==
- Biofuel policy of Malaysia
- Climate change in Malaysia
- List of power stations in Malaysia
- Sabah Electricity
- Sarawak Energy Berhad
- Tenaga Nasional Berhad
