= Tenom Pangi Dam =

Dam in Tenom, Sabah, Malaysia

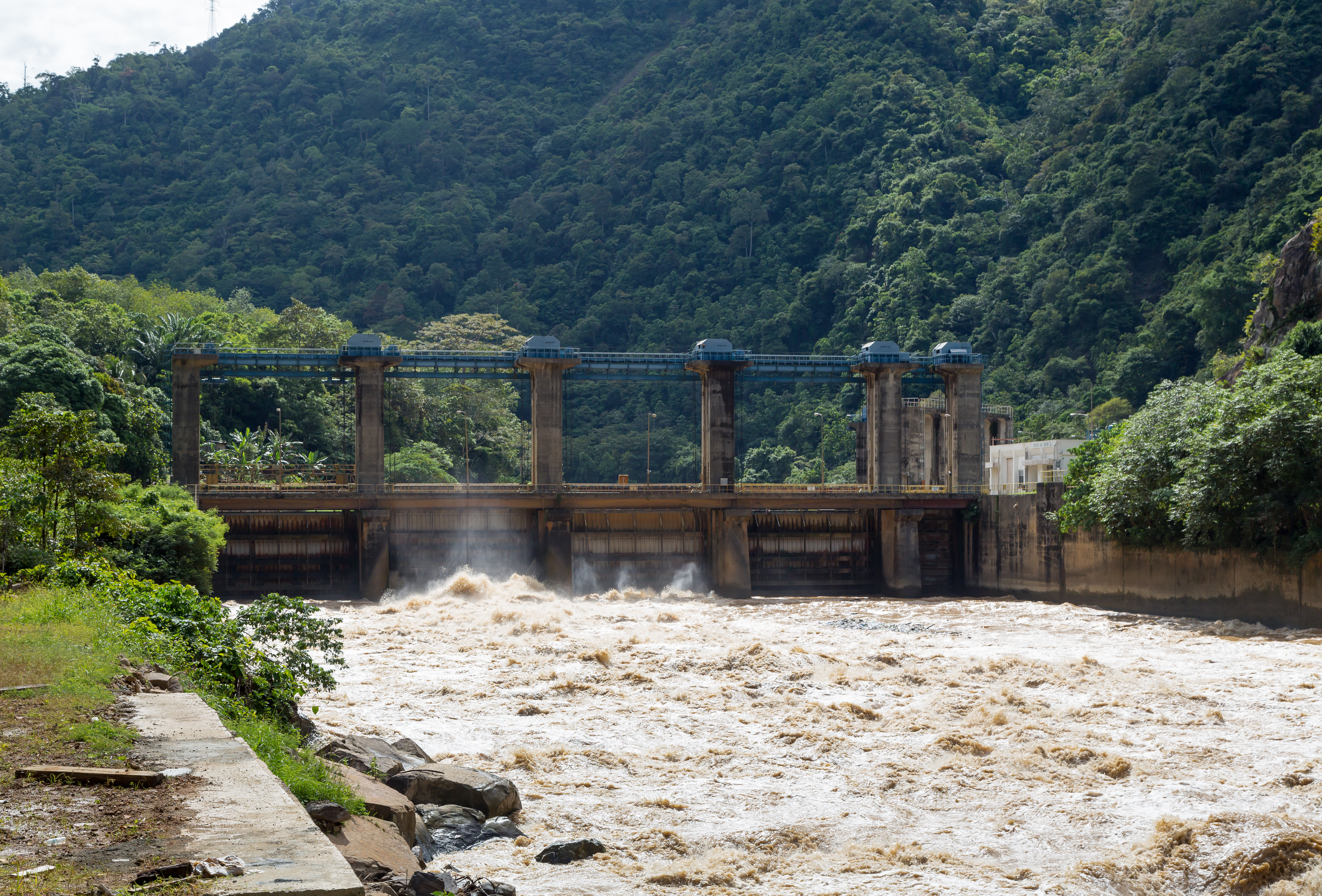
- Front view of the Hydroelectric Plant.
- Interactive map of Tenom Pangi Dam
- Country: Malaysia
- Location: Sabah
- Coordinates: 5.1154°N 115.9121°E
- Purpose: Power
- Status: Operational
- Construction began: 1978
- Opening date: 1984
- Owner: Sabah Electricity

Dam and spillways
- Type of dam: Gravity dam
- Impounds: Padas River
- Height (foundation): 43 metres (141 ft)
- Length: 83 metres (272 ft)
- Elevation at crest: 404 metres (1,325 ft)
- Spillway type: Chute

Tenom Pangi Hydroelectric Power Plant
- Type: Run-of-the-river
- Turbines: 3 Francis
- Pump-generators: 3
- Installed capacity: 66 MW
- Annual generation: 400 GW·h

Tenom Pangi Dam (Malay: Empangan Tenom Pangi) is a hydroelectric plant in Tenom, Sabah, Malaysia. It is located 120 km (75 mi) south of Kota Kinabalu on the Padas River. The project is a run-of-river hydroelectric power plant. Tenom Pangi Dam is the only major hydroelectric dam in Sabah.

The power station has three turbines of 22 MW installed capacity totaling 66 MW. Continuous power output is 66 MW. Average annual energy output is 400 GWh. The station is operated by Sabah Electricity.

Construction started in 1978 and was completed in 1984. The dam became operational in 1984 (42 years ago). The plant suffered extensive flood damage in 1988, where the trash rack and log boom were washed away and the intake and gate machinery damaged. It was refurbished in 2003.

== Specifications ==
The permanent dam components are as follows:

- Power Intake Structure – 3 bays.
- Spillway – gated concrete weir run-off river type.
- Power Tunnels – 3 exposed penstocks
- Powerhouse
  - Powerhouse – above ground 4 levels
  - With 3 penstocks to powertrains comprising 3 turbines of 22MW each, 4 air-cooled generators of 25MVA each and 3 transformers of 25MVA each.

== See also ==
- Sabah Electricity
- Tenaga Nasional
- Batang Ai Dam
