= Energy Commission (Malaysia) =

- Suruhanjaya Tenaga سوروهنجاي تناڬ

Agency overview
- Formed: 1 January 2002; 24 years ago
- Preceding agency: Department of Electricity and Gas Supply
- Headquarters: Putrajaya
- Minister responsible: Fadillah Yusof, Minister of Energy Transition and Public Utilities
- Agency executives: Mohammed Rashdan Mohd Yusof, Chairman; Abdul Razib Dawood, Chief Executive Officer
- Parent agency: Ministry of Science and Technology (Malaysia)
- Website: www.st.gov.my

The Energy Commission (Malay: Suruhanjaya Tenaga), abbreviated ST, is a regulatory body for the energy industry in Peninsular Malaysia and Sabah. The commission was established under the Energy Commission Act 2001. Its key role to ensure that the energy industry is developed in an efficient manner so that Malaysia is ready to meet the new challenges of globalisation and liberalisation, particularly in the energy supply industry.

The commission regulates and promotes all matters relating to the electricity and gas supply industry within the scope of applicable legislation namely Electricity Supply Act 1990, License Supply Regulation 1990, Gas Supply Act 1993, Electricity Regulation 1994, and Gas Supply Regulation 1997. In performing its role the commission takes the self-regulation approach.

== History ==
Prior to privatisation in 1990, the responsibility for planning and operation of the electricity supply industry in Peninsular Malaysia and Sabah vested in the National Electricity Board and the Sabah Electricity Board respectively while the Electrical Inspectorate Department, under the Ministry of Energy was responsible for licensing of private generation and the safety of electrical installations and equipment. Whereas in Sarawak, the Sarawak Electricity Supply Corporation (SESCO) was the supply authority while the State Inspectorate was responsible for licensing and safety matters in the state.

In 1990, the Electrical Inspectorate Department was abolished and the Department of Electricity Supply formed under the Electricity Supply Act 1990 as the industry and safety regulator of the electricity supply industry in Peninsular and Sabah. However, in Sarawak, the State Electricity Ordinance is still in force providing the State Electrical Inspectorate with the legal power to continue with its regulatory functions.

In 1993, the Department of Gas Supply under the Prime Minister’s Department was formed for regulating the gas distribution industry. The Director General of Electricity Supply was also appointed as the Director General of Gas Supply. Administratively, the two departments are jointly known as the Department of Electricity and Gas Supply.

With the anticipation of industry deregulation, the Energy Commission Act 2001 was approved by the parliament to take over the functions of the Department of Electricity and Gas Supply. The Energy Commission was established under this act on 1 May 2001 and became fully operational on 2 January 2002.

== Roles and Responsibilities ==
The Energy Commission is the regulator for the electricity and gas supply industry based on the powers provided by the Energy Commission Act 2001 and other related acts. The following are the roles and responsibilities identified by the Energy Commission:

- Economic regulation, which includes to promote efficiency and economy in the generation, production, transmission, distribution, supply and the use of electricity and in the gas supply industry and the use of gas supply through pipelines; promoting and safeguarding competition; enabling fair and efficient market conduct or, in the absence of a competitive market, to prevent the misuse of monopoly or market power in respect of the generation, production, transmission, distribution and supply of electricity and the gas supply industry. It also includes licensing, enforcement of license conditions for licensee and application providers and ensuring compliance to rules and performance/service quality.
- Tariff, to ensure that electricity tariff in the country reflect fair pricing which is affordable to consumers and less costly to production industries and commercial enterprises, while allowing a reasonable profit to the utility.
- Technical regulation, to achieve secure, reliable, safe system and realisation of fair and transparent conduct of the grid and distribution operator, the development and enforcement of technical codes and standards.
- Consumer protection, which emphasizes the empowerment of consumers while at the same time ensures adequate protection measures in areas such as dispute resolution, affordability of services and service availability.
- Safety regulation, to protect person(s) from dangers arising from the generation, production, transmission, generation, distribution, supply and use of electricity as provided under the electricity supply laws, arising from the supply of gas through pipelines, and the use of gas as provided under gas supply laws.

== Projects ==
Several energy efficiency projects have been started by the commission, mostly related to efficient electricity generation and use:

- Capacity Building in Integrated Resources Planning (IRP) at Government and Related Agencies
- Ministry of Energy, Green Technology and Water Low Energy Office (LEO) at Putrajaya
- Small Renewable Energy Programme (SREP)
- Demand Side Management (DSM)
- Energy efficiency campaigns

== See also ==
- Biofuel policy of Malaysia
- Energy law of Malaysia
- Energy policy of Malaysia
