= Chenderoh Power Station =

Hydroelectric power station in Perak, Malaysia

- Location within Perak
- Official name: Stesen Janakuasa Chenderoh
- Country: Malaysia
- Location: Kuala Kangsar District, Perak
- Coordinates: 4.961°N 100.9782°E

Chenderoh Power Station or Chenderoh Dam (Malay: Stesen Janakuasa Chenderoh) is a hydroelectric power station in Chenderoh Lake, Kuala Kangsar District, Perak, Malaysia. It was constructed by Perak River Hydro-Electric Power Company Ltd and completed in 1930. The scheme was designed by consulting engineers Rendel, Palmer & Tritton of London and Vattenbyggnadsbyran (VBB) of Stockholm, Sweden. The architect was Osvald Almqvist.

It was the first major hydroelectric dam and power station in Malaysia. It was preceded by two stations on Malaya's rivers; the 800kw Ulu Gombak station in Selangor (1905) that was used to provide Kuala Lumpur's first electricity, and the Sungei Besi Tin Mines Ltd scheme at Ulu Langat that was purchased by FMS Electrical Department in 1929.

The Chenderoh plant was constructed in tandem with a steam power station at Malim Nawar, 65 km south of Chenderoh, that was commissioned in 1928. Between them, the stations supplied power to Kinta Valley's tin mining industry and associated settlements.

The station is operated by Tenaga Nasional.

== Design ==
The power station is a hydroelectric power station, using 4 turbines of 10.7 MW and one of 8.4 MW, totaling 40.5 MW installed capacity.

== Technical specifications ==
The permanent dam components are:

- Main Dam
  - Crest elevation is 50 metres (160 ft) above sea level (ASL), maximum flood level is 48 metres (157 ft), operating levels maximum 45 m.
  - Reservoir area at 45 metres (148 ft) ASL is 25 square kilometres (9.7 sq mi), and with a catchment area of x,000 km^{2}. Storage volume is 95 million cubic metres (3.4×10^{9} cu ft).
- Power Intake Structure - 5 bays.
- Spillway- gated concrete weir with chute and flip bucket.
- Power Tunnels - 5 tunnels.
- Powerhouse
  - powerhouse
  - with 5 penstocks to powertrains comprising 5 turbines of 10.7MW each and one of 8.4 MW, 5 generators of 15MVA each and 4 transformers of 15MVA each.
- Sirens
  - Used to warn residents when the dam is released or dam failure.
  - The entire system is the only one Federal Signal 2001-SRN.

== See also ==
- Tenaga Nasional

== Sources ==
- Central Electricity Board of the Federation of Malaya (1963), Cameron Highlands Hydro-Electric Scheme, Kuala Lumpur
