= National Grid (Malaysia) =

Electric power transmission network

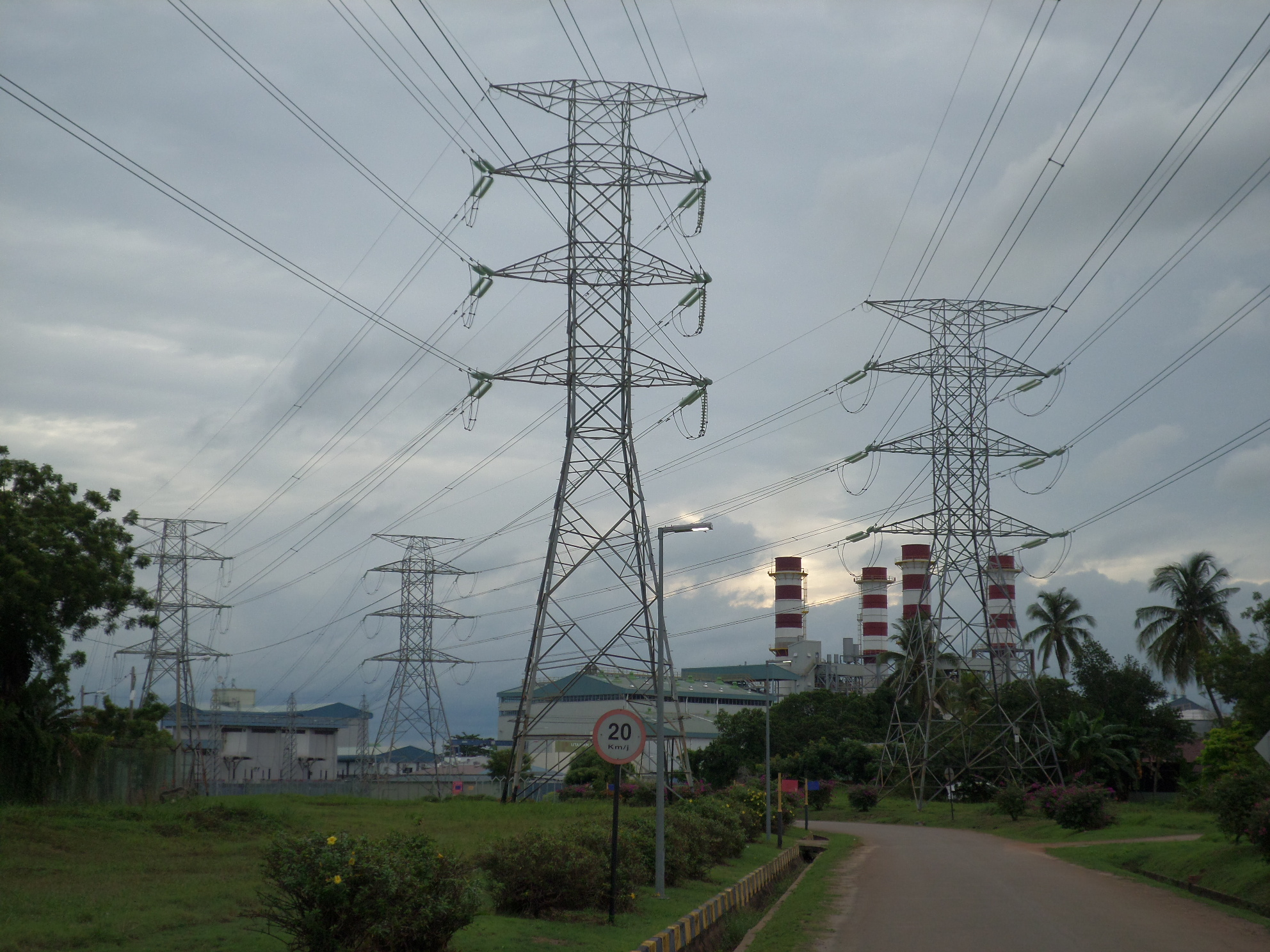
A 132 kV transmission line in Tanjung Kling Power Station in Malacca.

National Grid, Malaysia (Malay: Grid Nasional) is the high-voltage electric power transmission network in Peninsular Malaysia. It is operated and owned by Tenaga Nasional Berhad (TNB) by its Transmission Division. There are two other electrical grids in Sabah and Sarawak operated by Sabah Electricity Sdn Bhd (SESB) and Sarawak Energy Berhad (SEB).

The system spans the whole of Peninsular Malaysia, transporting electricity in bulk from power generators owned by TNB and Independent Power Producers (IPPs) to distributors. The grid also transports directly to large industrial customers, such as steel mills and fertilizer plants.

== History ==
The beginnings of the National Grid was slowly taking shape in 1964 when the Bangsar Power Station was connected to the Connaught Bridge Power Station, with the line subsequently extended to Malacca.

By 1965, a plan was set to connect the electricity generating plants that were spread out all over the country. Plants identified to be linked were located at Paka in Terengganu, Temengor, Kenering, Bersia and Batang Padang in Perak, Connaught Bridge, Kapar and Serdang in Selangor, Cameron Highlands in Pahang, Perai in Penang, Port Dickson in Negeri Sembilan, Pergau in Kelantan, Pasir Gudang in Johor and in Malacca.

The central area network with Connaught Bridge Power Station in Klang was the precursor of the energy grid; it also tapped into the Cameron Highlands Hydro scheme from the Sultan Yussuf Power Station, and was extended into a western network. Late in the 1980s, the loop was complete when Kota Bharu joined the grid.

== Grid description ==
=== Transmission system ===
More than 420 transmission substations in the Peninsular Malaysia, with a total installed capacity of 105,305 MVA, are linked together by approximately 21,000 circuit-kilometers of overhead lines and underground cables operating at 132, 275 and 500 kilovolts (kV). The 500 kV transmission system is the single largest transmission system to be ever developed in Malaysia. Begun in 1994, Phase 1 involved the design and construction of the 500kV overhead lines from Gurun, Kedah in the North along the west coast to Kapar, in the central region and from Pasir Gudang to Yong Peng in the south of Peninsular Malaysia.

The total distance covered for the 500 kV transmission lines is 784 circuit-km and the 275 kV portion is 9,257 circuit-km as of February 2017. To cater for the new plant up of generators, namely 3,100 MW Janamanjung Power Plant in the west coast, 372 MW Ulu Jelai Hydro Electric Power Plant in the east coast, and 4,100 MW Tanjung Bin Power Plant in the south, the 500 kV transmission system was extended from Bukit Tarek to Yong Peng via interconnection allows for electricity of Ayer Tawar, Tapah, Bentong South and Lenggeng. The completion of this interconnection allows for electricity transmission to the load centre, which is located in the Klang Valley area of Peninsular Malaysia.

A project involving laying a 730 km high-voltage direct current transmission line and a 670 km undersea cable for the 2,400-megawatt Bakun hydroelectric dam was considered. This would have connected all three of Malaysia's electric utility companies with state grids: Tenaga Nasional Berhad (TNB), Sarawak Energy Berhad (SEB) and Sabah Electricity Sdn Bhd (SESB). Many of Sabah and Sarawak's generation plants are still not interconnected to a grid.

=== Type of National Grid's transmission system ===
Lines	Photos	Description	Length
500 kV		The single largest transmission system to be ever developed in Malaysia. the backbone of the transmission system in Peninsular Malaysia	522 km
275 kV		Large transmission system	73 km
132 kV		Medium transmission system	
33 kV		Small transmission system	

==== Connection to Thailand ====
The National Grid is interconnected in the north to Electricity Generating Authority of Thailand (EGAT)'s transmission system via the 300 kV HVDC interconnection of 300MW capacity and 132 kV HVAC double circuit overhead line of 90MW capacity each, linking Bukit Ketri-Chuping in the state of Perlis with Sadao, Sadao in Thailand.

==== Connection to Singapore ====
In the South of Malaysia, the National Grid is connected to the transmission system of Singapore Power Limited (SP) at Senoko via two 230 kV submarine cables with a transmission capacity of 200 MW each.

=== Power generation ===
Power generation capacity connected to the Malaysian National Grid is 22,858 megawatts, with a maximum demand of 17,788 megawatts as of April 2016 according to Suruhanjaya Tenaga. The generation fuel mix in peninsular is 45.55% gas, 50.23% coal, 3.59% hydro and 0.63% from other forms of fuel.

=== Distribution level ===
Distribution lines of 66kV, 33 kV, 22 kV, 11 kV, 6.6 kV and 400/230 volt electricity distribution network connect to the National Grid via transmission substations will have their voltages stepped down by transformers.

== Major incidents ==
- Following a major system collapse on 3 August 1996, TNB has undertaken joint studies with Tokyo Electric Power Company (TEPCO) to develop a controlled islanding scheme to prevent the occurrence of a complete system collapse by ensuring continuity of supply to the Kuala Lumpur Metropolitan and Multimedia Super Corridor (MSC). The islanding scheme would basically be a "last line of defense" after all the normal emergency countermeasures such as underfrequency load shedding have operated.
- On 13 January 2005 a power blackout on northern peninsular Malaysia occurred when a transmission line near Serendah, Selangor, had broken down. In response to this, the Central Area Reinforcement (CAR) project was approved to ensure security of power supply to the Klang Valley.
- On 22 April 2008 Sabah had the worst power outage since the commissioning of the east west power grid. Suspected vandals are believed to have removed steel pieces of a 132kV transmission tower that led to its collapse, triggering a major power blackout. An emergency temporary tower was to be built immediately but it also collapsed during construction killing a TNB personnel. On 1 May 2008, another tower collapsed due to missing structural members of the tower that were suspected of being stolen.

== Future ==
Malaysia's national electricity grid system is weakly prepared to accommodate the expanding production of electricity from renewable energy.

== See also ==
- Energy policy of Malaysia
- List of power stations in Malaysia
- Sabah Electricity
- Sarawak Energy
- Tenaga Nasional Berhad
