= Chenderoh Lake =

- Location within Malaysia
- Location: Kuala Kangsar, Perak, Malaysia
- Coordinates: 4°58′N 100°57′E
- Type: natural lake
- Basin countries: Malaysia

The Chenderoh Lake (Malay: Tasik Chenderoh) is a natural lake in Kuala Kangsar District, Perak, Malaysia. The lake has been dammed for Chenderoh Power Station.
