= Batang Ai Dam =

Dam in Sarawak, Malaysia

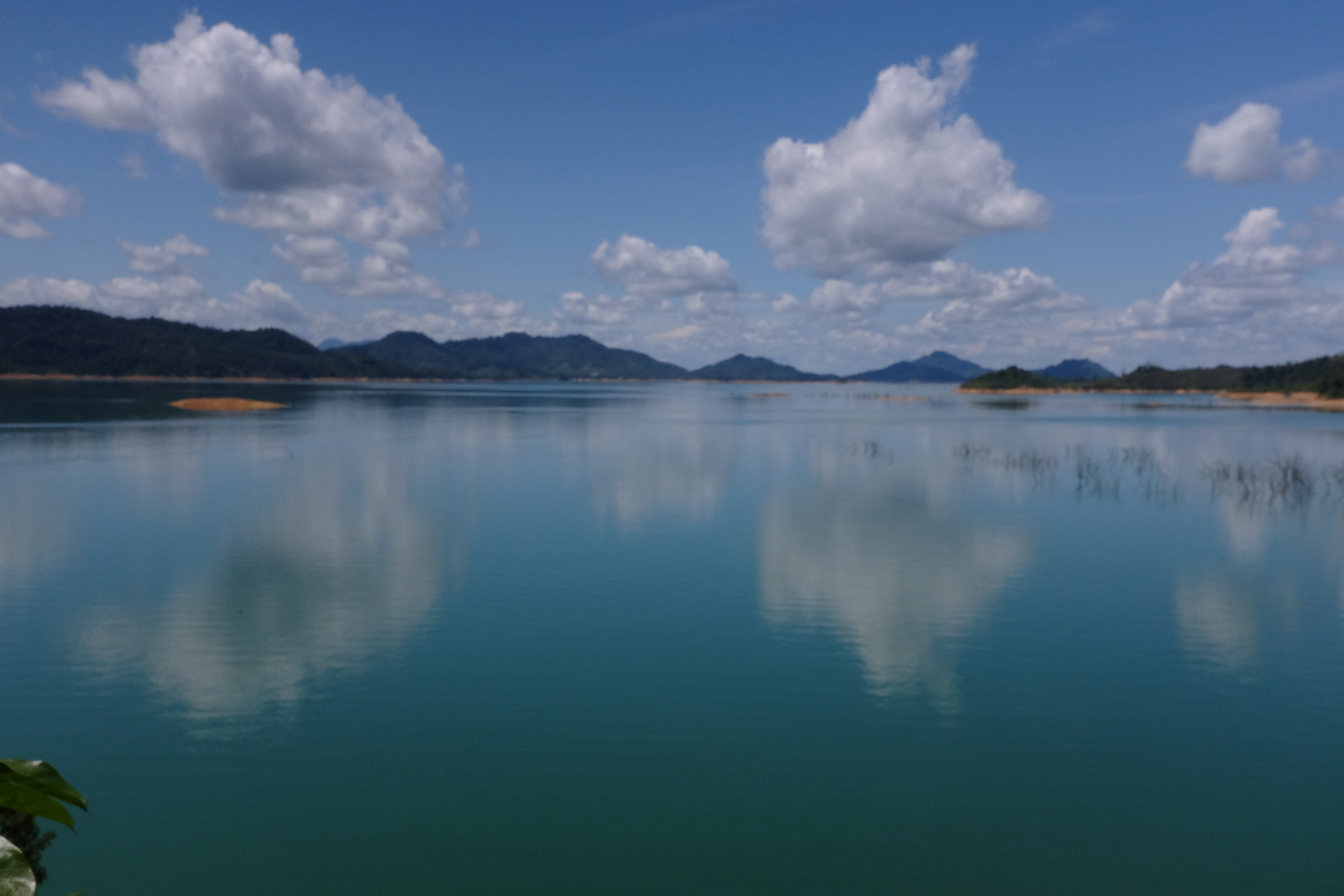
- Scenery of water catchment area of Batang Ai Dam

- Location within Malaysia
- Interactive map of Batang Ai Dam
- Coordinates: 01°08′50″N 111°52′26″E
- Construction began: 1982
- Opening date: 1985

Dam and spillways
- Impounds: Batang Ai River
- Height: 85 m (279 ft)
- Length: 810 m (2,660 ft)
- Spillway capacity: 2,438 m^{3}/s (86,097 cu ft/s)

Reservoir
- Creates: Batang Ai Reservoir
- Total capacity: 2,870,000,000 m^{3} (2,326,747 acre⋅ft)
- Inactive capacity: 1,630,000,000 m^{3} (1,321,463 acre⋅ft)
- Catchment area: 1,200 km^{2} (460 mi^{2})
- Surface area: 85 km^{2} (33 mi^{2})

Power Station
- Operator: Sarawak Energy
- Turbines: 4 × 25 MW Francis-type
- Installed capacity: 100 MW

The Batang Ai Dam (Malay: Empangan Batang Ai) is a concrete-face rock-fill dam in Batang Ai National Park in Sarawak, Malaysia. The power station comprises four 25 MW turbines, totalling the installed capacity to 100 MW. The station is operated by Sarawak Electricity Supply Corporation. Preparations for the dam began in 1975, before the design was published in 1977. Construction started in 1982 with the river diversion work and the last turbine completed in 1985. The Batang Ai project, a relatively modest dam financed by the Asian Development Bank, caused the displacement of approximately 3,000 people from 26 longhouses. These people have since been accommodated in the Batang Ai Resettlement Scheme to cultivate cocoa and rubber but the programme has not been successful.

A 50 MW floating solar project was installed at the dam in 2025.

== See also ==
- List of power stations in Malaysia
- National Grid, Malaysia

== Notes ==
- Economic Panning Unit (1996), Bakun – Green Energy For The Future, Kuala Lumpur, Malaysia: Percetakan Nasional Bhd. Page 14 Table 2-1 Batang Ai Dam.
- Kaur, Amarhit. "A History of Forestry in Sarawak." Modern Asian Studies 32.1 (1998): 117–47.
