= Power outages in Malaysia =

Several major power outages have occurred in the country of Malaysia.

== 1992 blackout ==
On 29 September 1992, Malaysia suffered a long and total power blackout caused by lightning striking a transmission facility and causing a rolling failure in the transmission and distribution system.

== 1996 blackout ==
See: 1996 Peninsular Malaysia power outage

A widespread power outage in Peninsular Malaysia began at 17:17 on 3 August 1996. The states of Peninsular Malaysia – including Kuala Lumpur, Selangor, Putrajaya, Johor, Melaka, and Negeri Sembilan – lost power for several hours.

A transmission line near Sultan Ismail Power Station in Paka, Terengganu tripped at 5:17pm causing all power stations in Peninsular Malaysia to collapse resulting in a massive power failure. Supply was back to normal by 11pm.

The weekend power outage was the third in the past four years, and the worst since In the wake of that capacity-related stumble, the government moved to allow five independent power producers to enter the electricity-generation business. After this blackout, utility giant Tenaga Nasional's stock fell considerably.

== 2003 blackout ==
The southern Peninsular Malaysia electricity blackout crisis affected the southern part of Peninsular Malaysia, including Kuala Lumpur, Selangor, Negeri Sembilan, Malacca and Johor due to a power failure. The 5 states (including Kuala Lumpur) had been affected for 5 hours from 10.00 am local time (02:00 UTC) to 3.00 pm (07:00 UTC) on September 4, costing industries $13.8 million

== 2005 blackout ==
The northern Peninsular Malaysia blackout crisis was a power outage in Malaysia in 2005 where many states of Malaysia's northern peninsular, including Perak, Penang, Kedah, and Perlis had no electricity owing to a fault of the main cable transmission line grid near Serendah, Selangor.

== 2013 blackouts ==
On June 27, 2013, another severe blackout was reported during peak hour ~5.36pm at Sarawak which is claimed to be originated from Bakun Dam causing a trip for the rest of the generators across the grid resulting of severe traffic congestion in the major cities.

In July 2013, several power outages also occurred in Kuala Lumpur and Selangor.

On July 31, 2013, Puchong encountered a power outage from around 8 PM. During the Puchong power outage of July 31, 2013, a TNB spokesman said: "Our men are on the ground to rectify the situation. We apologise for any inconvenience caused."

== 2022 blackout ==
On July 27, 2022, much of the northern parts of Peninsular Malaysia, Klang Valley, Pahang and Negeri Sembilan have reported widespread blackout from 12:40 PM onwards.

Investigations by TNB revealed that a faulty appliance in Yong Peng North Main Entry Substation (PMU) have triggered the power failure at 12:39 PM. The fault have caused the loss of 10% electrical supply for entire Peninsula Malaysia at 2.2GW.

The power outage affected various services including RapidKL trains, KLIA main terminal, traffic lights, and network providers like TM Unifi and Digi. It lasted for up to several hours as power was gradually restored through repairs. Most areas except Klang Valley have the electricity restored within 20 to 40 minutes. The power restoration were completed at 3:02 PM the same day.

== 2023 Johor Bahru checkpoint blackout ==
On December 6, 2023, Sultan Iskandar Building, the land checkpoint in Johor Bahru end of the Johor–Singapore Causeway, experience 11 hours of power outage. A scheduled maintenance work on the night of December 5 turned awry when backup generators broke down, causing extended power outage until the morning of December 6. The blackout caused long queues in the Johor checkpoint and officers on duty had to carry out immigration clearances manually in the dark. The power outage created traffic jam in Singapore side of the Causeway and Immigration and Checkpoints Authority warned travellers of "tailback from Malaysia". Johor Menteri Besar, Onn Hafiz Ghazi, said that the power outage was an embarrassment to Johor.
