= Murum Dam =

Dam in Kapit, Sarawak, Malaysia

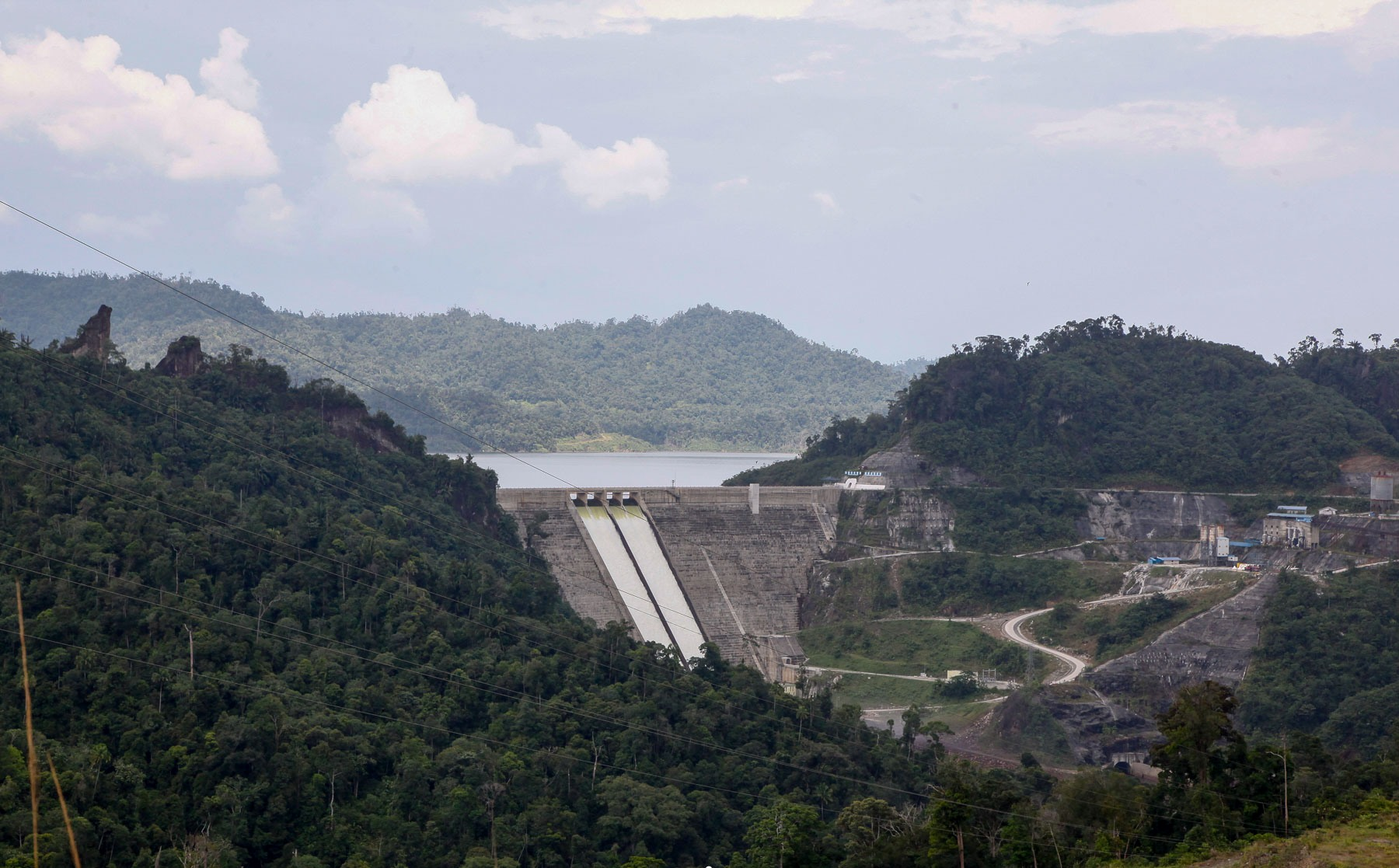

- Location within Malaysia
- Official name: Empangan Murum
- Country: Malaysia
- Location: Belaga, Sarawak, Borneo
- Coordinates: 2°38′48″N 114°21′57″E
- Status: Operational
- Construction began: 2008
- Opening date: 2014
- Construction cost: MYR 4.1 billion
- Owner: Sarawak Energy Berhad

Dam and spillways
- Type of dam: Gravity, roller-compacted concrete
- Impounds: Murum River
- Height: 141 m (463 ft)
- Length: 473 m (1,552 ft)

Reservoir
- Total capacity: 12,043,000,000 m^{3} (9,763,419 acre⋅ft)
- Active capacity: 5,475,000,000 m^{3} (4,438,655 acre⋅ft)
- Inactive capacity: 6,568,000,000 m^{3} (5,324,764 acre⋅ft)
- Catchment area: 2,750 km^{2} (1,062 mi^{2})
- Surface area: 245 km^{2} (95 mi^{2})
- Normal elevation: 540 m (1,772 ft)

Muram Hydroelectric Power Station
- Coordinates: 2°40′14.94″N 114°17′41.14″E
- Commission date: 2014-2015
- Turbines: 4 x 236 MW Francis-type
- Installed capacity: 944 MW

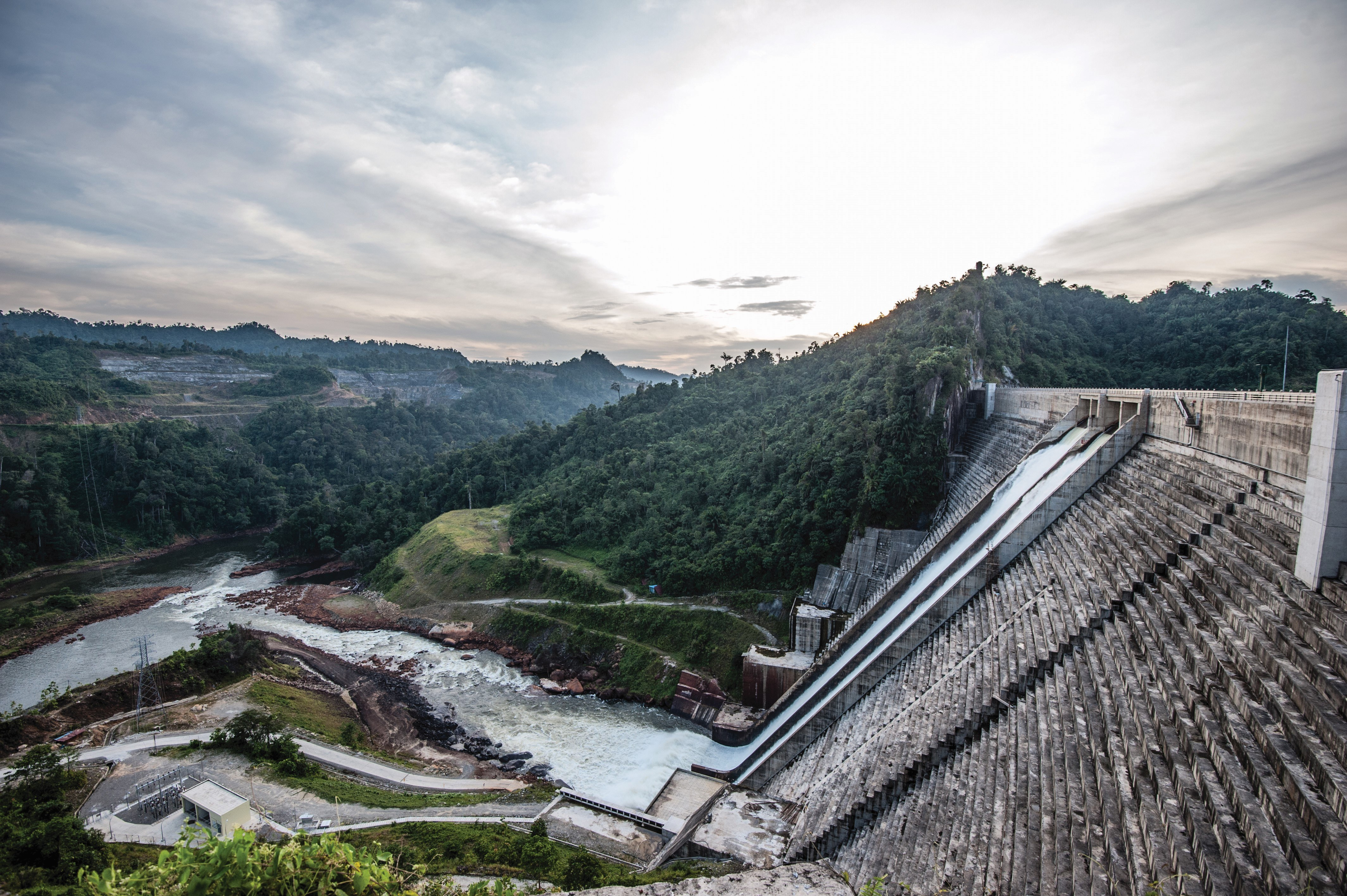
View of the Murum Dam

The Murum Dam (Malay: Empangan Murum) is a gravity dam on the Murum River in Sarawak, Malaysia. Construction began in 2008, the dam's reservoir began to fill in July 2013 and the first generator was commissioned in December 2014. The fourth and final turbine became operational on 8 June 2015. Concerns have been raised about the displacement of the Dayak people and the removal of rainforest due to the construction of the dam.

The dam site is located on the Murum River, which is in the uppermost part of the Rajang River basin, 200 km (124 mi) from Bintulu. The upstream of Rajang river includes four steps, which are Pelagus, Bakun, Murum, and Belaga. The Murum Hydroelectric Project is the second Step-Hydroelectric Project of the four steps, and is 70 km (43 mi) from the constructing Bakun Hydroelectric Project downstream.

== See also ==
- Sarawak Corridor of Renewable Energy
- Environmental concerns with electricity generation
