= Biofuel policy of Malaysia =

National energy policy of Malaysia

The biofuel policy of Malaysia is documented in Malaysia's National Biofuel Policy document.

== Partnerships ==
Yanmar, a Japan-based global manufacturer of diesel engines planned to build a research facility in Malaysia to conduct research on the development of palm oil biodiesel. It plans to develop and test biodiesel for the industrial diesels it develops for its machines and generators. The research facility will be set up in Kota Kinabalu.

== Introduction of biodiesel blends in petrol stations in Malaysia ==
In 2014, after many delays Malaysia began the introduction in the sale of B5 biodiesel in most petrol stations around the country. This would be eventually replaced by B7 in late 2015.
