= Connaught Bridge Power Station =

Power station in Selangor, Malaysia

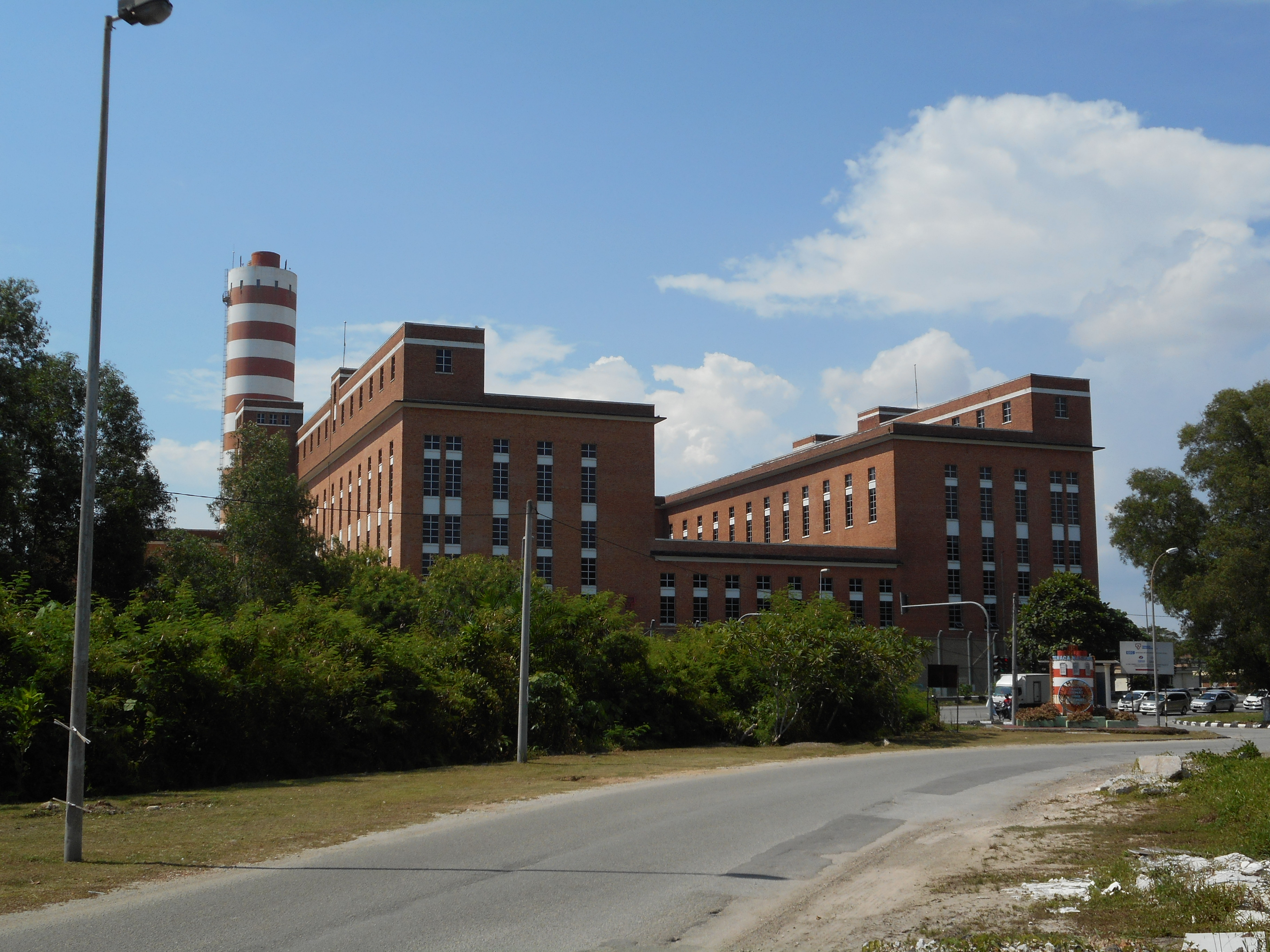
- Connaught Bridge Power Station
- Official name: Connaught Bridge Power Station
- Country: Malaysia
- Location: Kampong Jawa, Klang, Selangor
- Coordinates: 3°02′N 101°28′E
- Status: Operational
- Commission date: February 2016 (Redevelopment); 26 March 1953 (Block 1)
- Decommission date: December 2018 (Block 1)
- Owner: Tenaga Nasional
- Operators: Central Electricity Board (CEB) (Lembaga Letrik Pusat (LLP)) (1953-1965); National Electricity Board (NEB) (Lembaga Letrik Negara (LLN)) (1965-1990); Tenaga Nasional Berhad (TNB) (1990-present)

Thermal power station
- Primary fuel: Gas
- Secondary fuel: Distillate Fuel
- Combined cycle?: Yes

Power generation
- Nameplate capacity: 375 MW

External links
- Commons: Related media on Commons

Connaught Bridge Power Station is a combined cycle (1 gas turbines and 1 steam turbine) power station located near Kampong Jawa Klang, Selangor, Malaysia. It is one of the oldest power station in the country.

Prior to its redevelopment, the Connaught Bridge Power Station had an installed capacity of 895 MW consisting of a combined cycle unit (2 gas turbines and 1 steam turbine) producing 315 MW and four open cycle units (4 x GT13E) of 130 MW each. At the time, it and was the third largest of seven sister TNB power plants in the country

It was opened on 26 March 1953 by the High Commissioner for the Federation of Malaya, Sir Gerald Templer.

== Capacity ==
Following its redevelopment, the station currently has an installed generation capacity of 375MW.

As part of the Generation Division of the Tenaga Nasional Group of Malaysia, it shares and operates in support of the parent group's targets and objectives.

== Redevelopment ==
The Connaught Bridge Power Station is going through a redevelopment project.

The EPC contract was awarded to Sinohydro Corporation Ltd and Sinohydro Corporation (M) Sdn Bhd Consortium on 2 May 2013 with a contract period of 28 months. After the redevelopment, the plant with capacity of 384.7 MW will commence operation on 1 September 2015.

The plant commenced operations on February 2016.

== Access ==
The power station is near Bukit Badak Komuter station.
