= Sarawak Energy =

Electric utility company in Sarawak, Malaysia

Sarawak Energy Berhad
- Type: Private Limited Company
- Industry: Electrical power
- Founded: 1921; Kuching, Kingdom of Sarawak (Now Sarawak, Federation Of Malaysia)
- Headquarters: The Isthmus Off Jalan Keruing 93050, Kuching, Sarawak, Malaysia
- Key people: Dato Ruslan Abdul Ghani (CEO)
- Products: Power generation, transmission, distribution, Retail and Power Export
- Owner: Government of Sarawak
- Website: www.sarawakenergy.com

Sarawak Energy Berhad is a vertically integrated power utility and an energy developer with a vision to achieve sustainable growth and prosperity for Sarawak by meeting the region’s need for reliable and renewable energy.

It is one of Malaysia's three electrical companies, the other two being Tenaga Nasional serving Peninsular Malaysia, and Sabah Electricity which serves the state of Sabah and territory of Labuan.

== History ==
In 1921, an Electrical Section within the Public Works Department was set up to look after the public electricity supply. In 1932, "Sarawak Electricity Supply Company" was formed by the Brooke Administration to operate public electricity supply within Sarawak.

The Sarawak Electricity Company was dissolved in 1962, under the Sarawak Electricity Supply Corporation Ordinance 1962, and later created into a Corporation, known as Sarawak Electricity Supply Corporation (SESCO) (Malay: Perbadanan Pembekalan Letrik Sarawak, and later Perbadanan Pembekalan Elektrik Sarawak or PPLS). In 1996, Sarawak Enterprise Corporation Berhad bought over 45% stake of the Corporation from the Sarawak Government.

In 2005, SESCO was privatised and known as Syarikat SESCO Berhad, and bought over by Sarawak Energy Berhad.

Sarawak began to export electricity from Sarawak to West Kalimantan, Indonesia in January 2016 through a 275kV interconnection operated by Sarawak Energy. This project is the first successful power trading project for Malaysia.

== Generation capacity ==
Sarawak Energy generates electricity mainly from two major types of plant; hydroelectric plants (HEP) and thermal plants. With a total installed capacity of 5,203 MW, the major towns in Sarawak are connected via a 275/132kV State Transmission Grid.

Hydroelectric power plants

- Bakun HEP - 2,400MW
- Batang Ai HEP - 108 MW
- Murum HEP - 944MW
- Baleh HEP - 1,285MW (Commissioning in 2030)

Thermal power plants
Among the thermal plants in operation are:

- Miri power station, Miri - 99 MW, Open Cycle Gas Turbine
- Bintulu power station, Bintulu - 330 MW, Combined Cycle Power Plant
- Tg Kidurong Power Station, Bintulu - 192 MW, Open Cycle Gas Turbine
- Sejingkat Power Station, Kuching - 210 MW, coal-fired power station (phase II)
- Mukah Power Station, Mukah - 2 x 135 MW, Coal-Fired Power Station
- Balingian Coal Fired Power Station, Balingian - 624 MW

== Awards and accolades ==
Year	Award	Category	Nominated work/ persons	Result	Reference
2016	The BrandLaureate Awards	Most Sustainable Brand Award 2015-2016	—N/a	Won	
2017	9th Annual Global CSR Awards	Best Community Programme	Overall CSR programmes at Batang Ai Dam	Gold	
2017	Australasian Reporting Awards	—N/a	Annual Report	Bronze	
2018	Australasian Reporting Awards	—N/a	Annual Report	Silver	
2018	10th Annual Global CSR Awards	Best Community Programme	Sarawak Energy CSR Eye Vision Programme for Better Living in the Rural Community	Gold	
2018	Sustainable Business Awards	Best Strategy and Sustainability Management	—N/a	Won	
2018	Sustainable Business Awards	Best UN Sustainable Development Goals	—N/a	Won	
2018	Sustainable Business Awards	Special Recognition for Sustainability in the Community	—N/a	Won	
2019	Asean PR Excellence Awards	Best PR Programme – Asean Category	‘Mat Weavers’ Programme	Diamond	
2019	Asean PR Excellence Awards	Best PR Campaign – Asean Category	'Electrifying Sarawak and Beyond’ Campaign	Diamond	
2019	Australasian Reporting Awards	—N/a	Annual Report	Silver	
2019	The BrandLaureate Awards	Nation Branding Award 2018-2019	—N/a	Won	
2019	HR Asia Best Companies to Work for in Asia (Malaysia)	Utility	—N/a	Won	
2020	Annual Global Corporate Social Responsibility (CSR) Awards and Good Governance Awards	Excellence in Provision for Literacy & Education	Belaga Penan Education Fund	Platinum	
2020	Annual Global Corporate Social Responsibility (CSR) Awards and Good Governance Awards	The Best Chief Executive Officer	—N/a	Platinum	
2023	United Nations (UN) Global Compact Network Malaysia and Brunei (UNGCMYB) Forward Faster Sustainability Awards	UNGCMYB Forward Faster CEO	Datuk Haji Sharbini Suhaili	Won	
2023	United Nations (UN) Global Compact Network Malaysia and Brunei (UNGCMYB) Forward Faster Sustainability Awards	Special Climate Fellow Award	Mohd Irwan Aman	Won	
2023	United Nations (UN) Global Compact Network Malaysia and Brunei (UNGCMYB) Forward Faster Sustainability Awards	Partnership for the Goals and for Sustainability Awareness and Employee Engagement	—N/a	Won	

== See also ==
- National Grid, Malaysia
- Sabah Electricity
- Tenaga Nasional
- List of power stations in Malaysia
