= Sabah Electricity =

Sabah State Electric Utility

Sabah Electricity Sdn. Bhd.
- Company type: State-owned enterprise
- Industry: Energy
- Predecessor: Sabah Electricity Board (SEB)
- Founded: 1 September 1998; 27 years ago
- Headquarters: Kota Kinabalu, Malaysia
- Area served: State of Sabah and Federal Territory of Labuan
- Key people: Ir Ts Mohd Yaakob Jaafar, Chief Executive Officer
- Services: Electric generation, transmission, and distribution
- Number of employees: 2,600
- Parent: Tenaga Nasional Berhad (80 %), Government of Sabah (20 %)
- Website: www.sesb.com.my

Sabah Electricity Sdn. Bhd. or Sabah Electricity is Sabah's utility company that generates, transmits and distributes electricity mainly in the state of Sabah and the Federal Territory of Labuan. It supplies electrical power to over 600,000 customers distributed over a wide area of 74,000 km^{2}. 82.8% of the customers are domestic customers consuming only 28.8% of the power generated. This company employs more than 2,300 employees and the main stakeholders of this company are Tenaga Nasional Berhad (TNB) (80%) and Government of Sabah (20%).

== History ==
Electricity started in Sabah as early as 1910 supplied by 3 separate organisations. In 1957 these three organisations combined to form North Borneo Electricity Board. Upon the formation of Malaysia in 1963, it was renamed Sabah Electricity Board. On 1 September 1998, Sabah Electricity Board was privatised and became Sabah Electricity Sdn. Bhd.

== Generation capacity ==
The total generation capacity of SESB is 866.4 MW, 50.3% of the total units generated are purchased from the independent power producers (IPP).

The SESB installed capacity (excluding IPP) of the Sabah Grid which supplies electricity for major towns from Federal Territory of Labuan to Tawau is 430.9 MW and the maximum demand is 760 MW (as of Jun 2010).

The East Coast Grid 132kV Transmission Line connecting the major towns in the East Coast has an installed capacity of 333.02MW and the maximum demand is 203.3MW.

The forecast demand growth of electricity is in a region of 7.7% per annum up to the year 2010 and the electricity demand is expected to reach 1,500 MW by the year 2020. To support the growing demand, various generation, transmission and distribution projects will be implemented.

A fully integrated grid connecting the West Coast Grid to the East Coast Grid was completed on 28 July 2007, and about 90% of the customers are now connected to this integrated grid.

== Power generation plants ==
The summary of the list of power plants as follows:

- Number of Station: 37 (including 12 IPP excluding BELB stations)
- Power generated for FY 2010 up to July 2010: 1,279.6 GWh (SESB) & 3,075.8 GWh (IPP)

=== SESB-owned power stations ===
==== Major power stations ====
Name and location	Station type	Engine configuration	Capacity
SJ Patau-Patau	Thermal	2 x 32MW, 1 x 33MW, 1 x 15 MW	99.0 MW
SJ Hydro Tenom-Pangi	Hydroelectric	3 x 22 MW	66.0 MW
SJ Melawa	Thermal	3 x 8 MW, 1 x 20 MW	31.4 MW
SJ Tawau	Thermal	4 x 8 MW, 1 x 12 MW, 1 x 20 MW	40.0 MW
SJ Sandakan	Thermal	2 x 8.5 MW, 2 x 14 MW, 2 x 19 MW	72.0 MW

==== Installed capacity by plant type ====
- DG Diesel (Major) - 21%
- DG Diesel (Minor) - 26%
- DG Diesel (Rural) - 1%
- GT Diesel - 17%
- GT Gas - 18%
- Hydro - 12%
- Mini Hydro - 2%
- Steam Turbine - 3%

=== IPP-owned stations ===
- ARL Tenaga - 7%
- Biomass (TSH) - 2%
- Kadamaian, M. Hydro - <1%
- Kinabio - 2%
- Powertron I - 28%
- Powertron II - 20%
- SBPC - 15%
- Seguntor - 2%
- Serudong Power - 5%
- SPC Energy - 5%
- Stratavest - 9%
- Sutera Harbour - 5%

=== Overall power generation capacity ===
- IPP - 70%
- SESB - Diesel - 11%
- SESB - Gas - 9%
- SESB - Hydro - 10%

== Transmission lines ==
The interconnected system comprises West Coast Power grid and East Coast Power Grid. The transmission circuit length (in circuit-kilometres) as in December 2007:

=== Overhead lines ===
Capacity	Length (Circuit-km)
275 kV	492.00
123 kV	860.86
132 kV (EC)	659.14
132 kV (WC)	100.34
66 kV	8.51+
Undefined/Unknown Voltage Transmission Lines	12.87+

=== Underground cable ===
Capacity	Length (Circuit-km)
132 kV	37.90
66 kV	22.16

=== Submarine cable ===
Capacity	Length (Circuit-km)
132 kV	29.00

=== Main intake substation ===
Capacity	Number of intake substation
275 kV	4
132 kV	15
132 kV	9
66 kV	7

== Power distribution ==
Distribution system capacity as in August 2009:

Voltage	Line length (km)	Number of transformers
11 kV	7,421.7	5588
22 kV	260.0	119
33 kV	772.9	50

=== Electrical consumption ===
- Number of customers as in July 2010: 432,390 customers

Sector	Consumption (GWh)	Percentage
Domestic	1,167.11	31%
Commercial	1,440.55	39%
Industrial	1,072.75	29%
Public lighting	46.59	1%

== See also ==
- National Grid, Malaysia
- Tenaga Nasional
- Sarawak Energy
