= Tenaga Nasional =

Malaysian electricity company

Tenaga Nasional Berhad

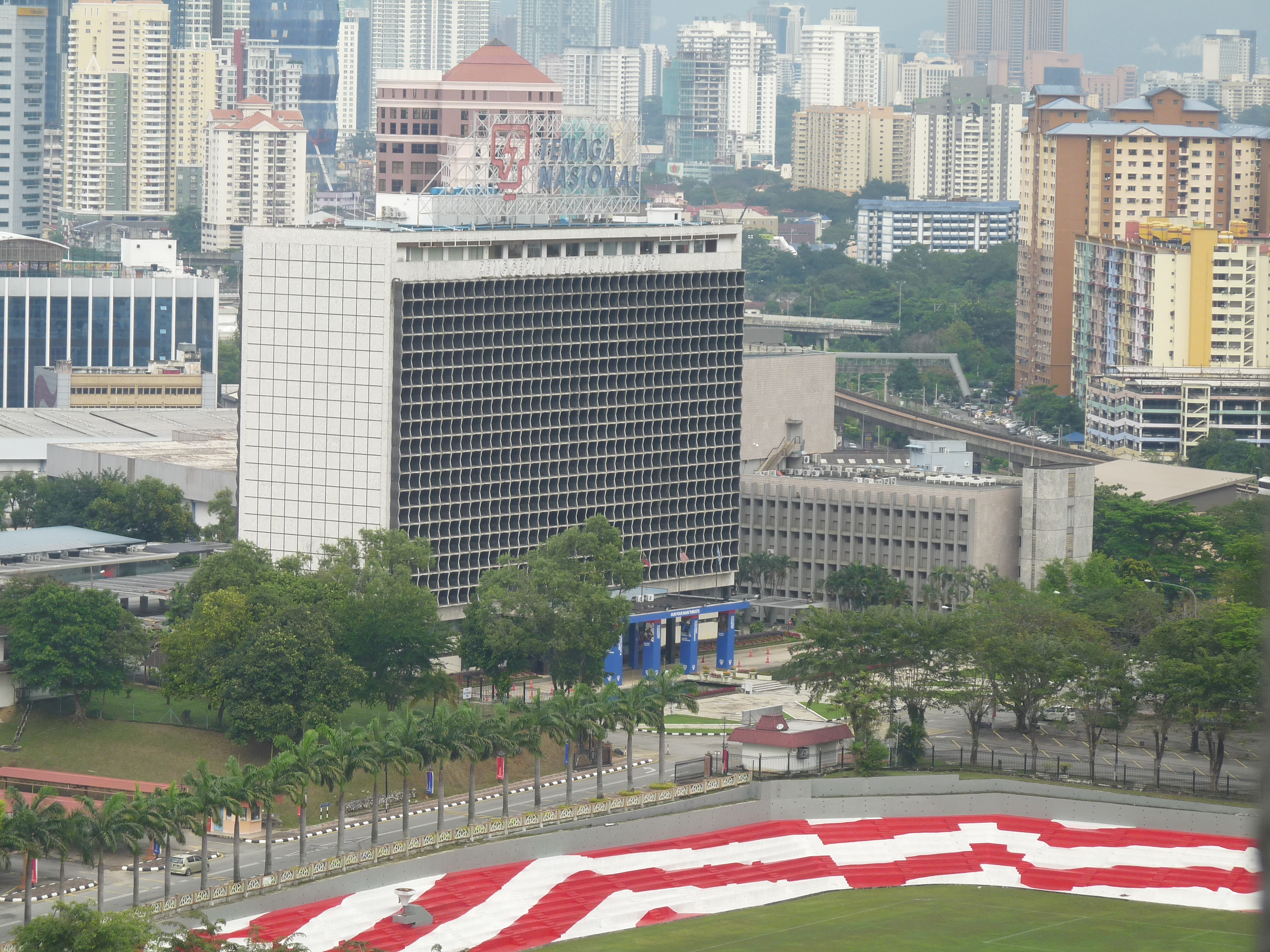
- The Tenaga Nasional headquarters in Bangsar.
- Type: Publicly traded state-owned enterprise
- Traded as: MYX: 5347
- ISIN: MYL5347OO009
- Industry: Electric power industry
- Predecessor: Central Electricity Board (CEB); National Electricity Board (NEB)
- Founded: 1 February 1990; 36 years ago
- Headquarters: Bangsar, Kuala Lumpur, Malaysia
- Area served: Malaysia (except Sarawak), United Kingdom, Ireland, Turkey, Kuwait, Saudi Arabia, Pakistan, Cambodia, Australia
- Key people: Tan Sri Dato' Abdul Razak bin Abdul Majid (Chairman); Datuk Ir. Ts. Shamsul bin Ahmad (President/Chief Executive Officer)
- Services: Power generation, transmission, distribution and electricity retailing
- Revenue: ▲RM67.72 billion (2025)
- Operating income: ▼RM8.53 billion (2025)
- Net income: ▲RM4.76 billion (2025)
- Total assets: ▼RM198.35 billion (2025)
- Number of employees: 35,476 (2025)
- Parent: Employees Provident Fund (Malaysia) (22.6%); Khazanah Nasional (17.2%); Permodalan Nasional Berhad (13.3%); Retirement Fund (Incorporated) (7.6%); Foreign Shareholdings (17.4%); Local Corporations & Retail (19.1%); Other Government Agencies (2.8%)
- Subsidiaries: TNB Genco; Malaysia Transformer Manufacturing (MTM); TNB Integrated Learning Solution; Allo Technology; TNB Research; TNB Engineering Corporation; TNB Renewables; Universiti Tenaga Nasional; TNB Energy Services; Sabah Electricity; Tenaga Switchgear; TNB Fuel Services Sdn. Bhd.
- Website: www.tnb.com.my

Tenaga Nasional Berhad (lit. 'National Energy Limited', abbreviated as TNB; TENA, MYX: 5347), also known as Tenaga Nasional or simply Tenaga, is the Malaysian multinational electricity company and is the primary electric utility company in Peninsular Malaysia and also the largest publicly listed power company in Southeast Asia with MYR 198.35 billion worth of assets. It serves over 10.65 million customers throughout Peninsular Malaysia (except Sarawak) (Note: The electric power business in Sarawak is managed by Sarawak Energy, a Sarawak state-owned energy company.) and 0.73 million customers in the East Malaysian state of Sabah and Labuan through Sabah Electricity.

TNB's core activities are in the power generation, transmission, electricity distribution and electricity retailing. Other activities include repairing, testing and maintaining power plants, providing engineering, procurement and construction services for power plants related products, assembling and manufacturing high voltage switchgears, coal mining and trading. Operations are carried out in Malaysia, (except Sarawak), United Kingdom, Ireland, Turkey, Kuwait, Saudi Arabia, Pakistan, India, Cambodia, and Australia. TNB also offers higher education through its university, Universiti Tenaga Nasional (Uniten). TNB also exports electricity to Singapore via a partnership between its subsidiary TNB Power Generation Sdn Bhd and YTL PowerSeraya Pte Ltd.

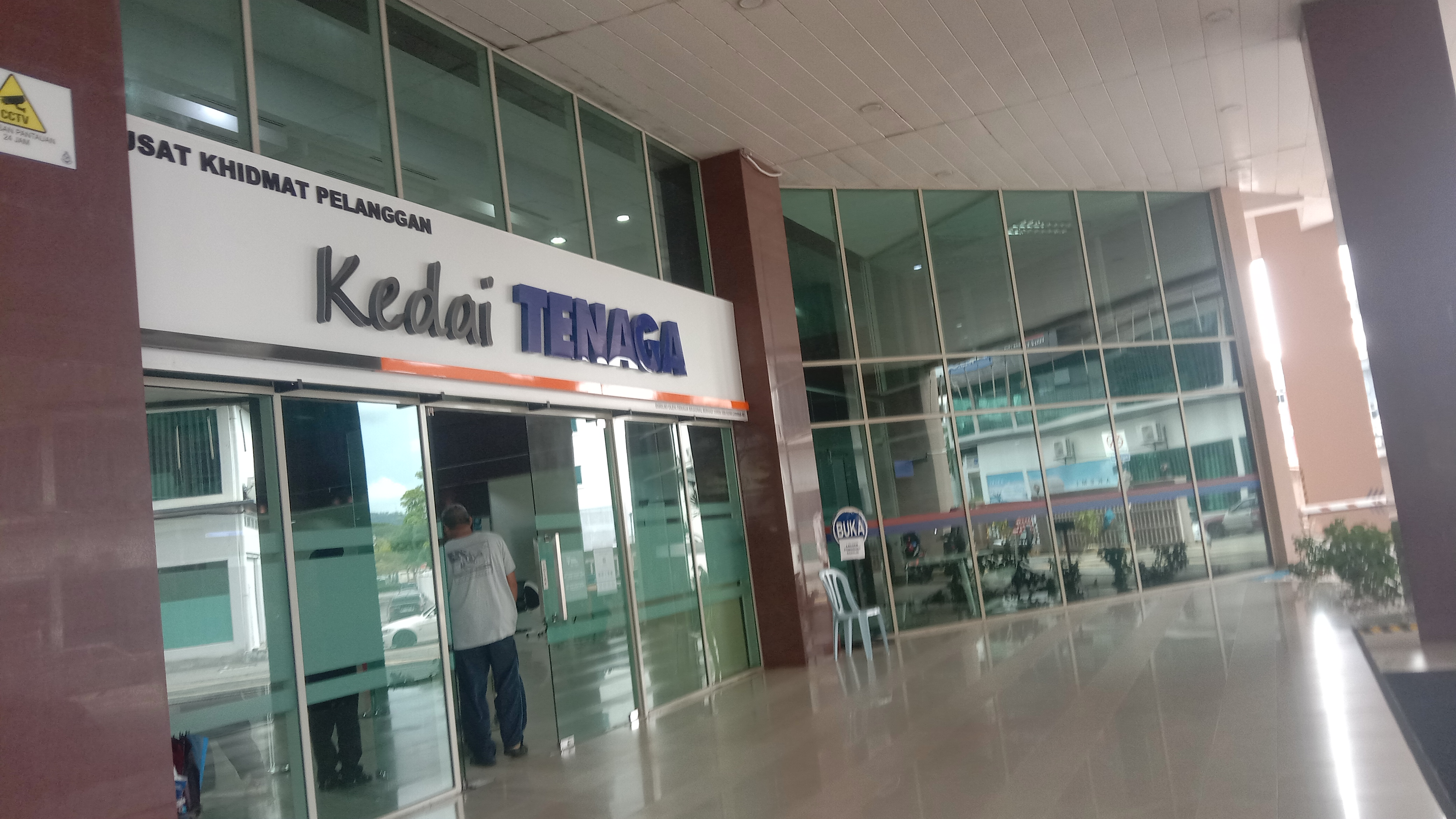
Kedai TENAGA in Seremban

TNB is one the companies under Khazanah Nasional's investment portfolios, Malaysian sovereign wealth fund and also one of the 9 Malaysian companies listed on the Forbes Global 2000 in 2025. TNB is ranked 26th globally in Brand Finance: Utilities 50 2025 Ranking and 230th globally in 2023 Bentley Infrastructure 500. TNB is listed 19th in the Fortune Southeast Asia 500 List for 2026.

== History ==
=== Lembaga Letrik Pusat (1949–1965) ===
The Lembaga Letrik Pusat (Central Electricity Board, CEB) was established and came into operation on 1 September 1949. The Board was to become heir to three major projects considered by the Electricity Department following its re-establishment in April 1946 which were the Connaught Bridge Power Station, Cameron Highlands Hydroelectric Project and the development of a National Grid. CEB eventually became the owner of 34 power stations with a generation capacity of 39.88 MW, including a steam power station in Bangsar with a capacity of 26.5 MW, a hydroelectric power station at Ulu Langat with a capacity of 2.28 MW, and various diesel powered generators with a total capacity of 11.1 MW.

=== Lembaga Letrik Negara (1965–1990) ===
On 22 June 1965, the Central Electricity Board (CEB) of the Federation of Malaya was renamed the Lembaga Letrik Negara (National Electricity Board, NEB) of the States of Malaya. By the 1980s, the Board was supplying the whole peninsula with electricity, replacing the Perak River Hydro Electric Power company (PRHEP) and its subsidiary Kinta Electrical Distribution Co. Ltd (KED) in 1982, Penang Municipality in 1976, and areas supplied by Huttenbach Ltd in 1964, which included Alor Setar, Sungai Petani, Kulim, Lunas, Padang Serai, Telok Anson, Langkap, Tampin and Kuala Pilah.

On 4 May 1988, Prime Minister Mahathir Mohamad announced the government's decision on a policy of privatisation. Two pieces of legislation were passed to replace the Electricity Act and to provide for the establishment of a new corporation. Tenaga Nasional Berhad (TNB) was formed in 1990 by the Electricity Supply Successor Company Act 1990, to succeed the National Electricity Board (NEB) of the States of Malaya.

== Corporate governance ==
The board of directors is responsible for governing and setting policy for TNB, consisting of 13 members: 6 independent non-executive directors, 5 non-independent non-executive directors, an executive director, a TNB chairman/CEO and its president. The company's professional management team consists of 14 members.

== Divisions ==
=== Generation ===
Plans to expand its generation capacity include increasing hydroelectric generation by 2015 and commissioning the first nuclear power plant in Malaysia by 2025 if the government decides to include nuclear as an acceptable energy option. In 2021, Tenaga became part owner of the repowered Blyth Offshore Wind Farm in England.

In 2019, in efforts improve the efficiency, agility and performance of the company, TNB underwent an internal restructuring to split its domestic power generation and electricity retail businesses into two new wholly-owned subsidiaries. The internal restructuring was completed in 2020 following the incorporation of TNB Genco.

TNB Power Generation Sdn Bhd (TNB Genco) owns and operates thermal assets and hydroelectric generation schemes in Peninsular Malaysia. TNB Genco is currently Malaysia’s largest power producer contributing to 52.4% of the generation market share in Peninsular Malaysia.

=== Grid ===
The TNB Group has a complete power supply system, including the National Grid, which is energised at 132, 275 and 500 kilovolt (kV), with its tallest electricity pylon in Malaysia and Southeast Asia being the Kerinchi Pylon located near Menara Telekom, Kerinchi, Kuala Lumpur. The National Grid is linked via a 300 MW HVDC and 132 kV HVAC interconnection to Thailand and 230 kV submarine cables to Singapore.

TNB, through its subsidiaries, is also involved in the manufacturing of transformers, high voltage switchgears and electrical cables, consultancy services, architectural, civil and electrical engineering works and services, repair and maintenance services and fuel undertakes research and development, property development, and project management services.

=== Distribution Network ===
The Distribution Network division conducts the distribution network operations and electricity retail operations of TNB. The division plans, constructs, operates, performs repairs and maintenance and manages the assets of the 33 kV, 22 kV, 11 kV, 6.6 kV and 415/240 volt in the Peninsular Malaysia distribution network. Sabah Electricity provides the same function in the state of Sabah.

The former Distribution Division was split on 1 August 2018 following an internal restructuring to form two separate divisions; the Distribution Network division and Retail Division.

=== Retail ===
TNB's Retail Division was established in 2018 enhance collection efficiency, promote rooftop solar generation as well as push beyond kWh service offerings such as multi-utility billing, fibre to-the-home broadband, and sales of third-party products.

To conduct its electricity retailing business, the Retail Division operates a network 13 state, 126 Kedai Tenaga outlets, and 3 CareLine offices. In Sabah, the management of retail activities is undertaken separately by Sabah Electricity Sdn. Bhd. Services provided the division include customer service and support, electricity billing and payment, electricity supply application, advisory services on electrical fixtures, and smart energy solutions.

== Branding ==
Since its privatization, the corporate slogan of TNB is 'Penggerak Kemajuan Negara' or Powering the Nation. Since 2013, the company has adopt new corporate slogan campaign, 'Better. Brighter'.

== See also ==
- Electricity sector in Malaysia
- National Grid, Malaysia
- Sabah Electricity
- Sarawak Energy
